= 1460s in art =

- 1450s
- 1460s in art
- 1470s
Other topics in 1460s:
- Music

Art timeline

The decade of the 1460s in art involved some significant events.

== Events ==
- 1465
  - Andrea Mantegna begins work on the frescoes in the Camera degli Sposi of the Ducal Palace, Mantua.
  - Domenico di Michelino is commissioned to paint the fresco La commedia illumina Firenze in Florence Cathedral.
  - Filippo Lippi and his assistants finish work on the fresco cycle of the Stories of St. Stephen and St. John the Baptist in the Great Chapel (Cappella Maggiore) of Prato Cathedral.
- c.1466: Piero della Francesca finishes work on the frescoes of The History of the True Cross in San Francesco, Arezzo.

== Paintings ==
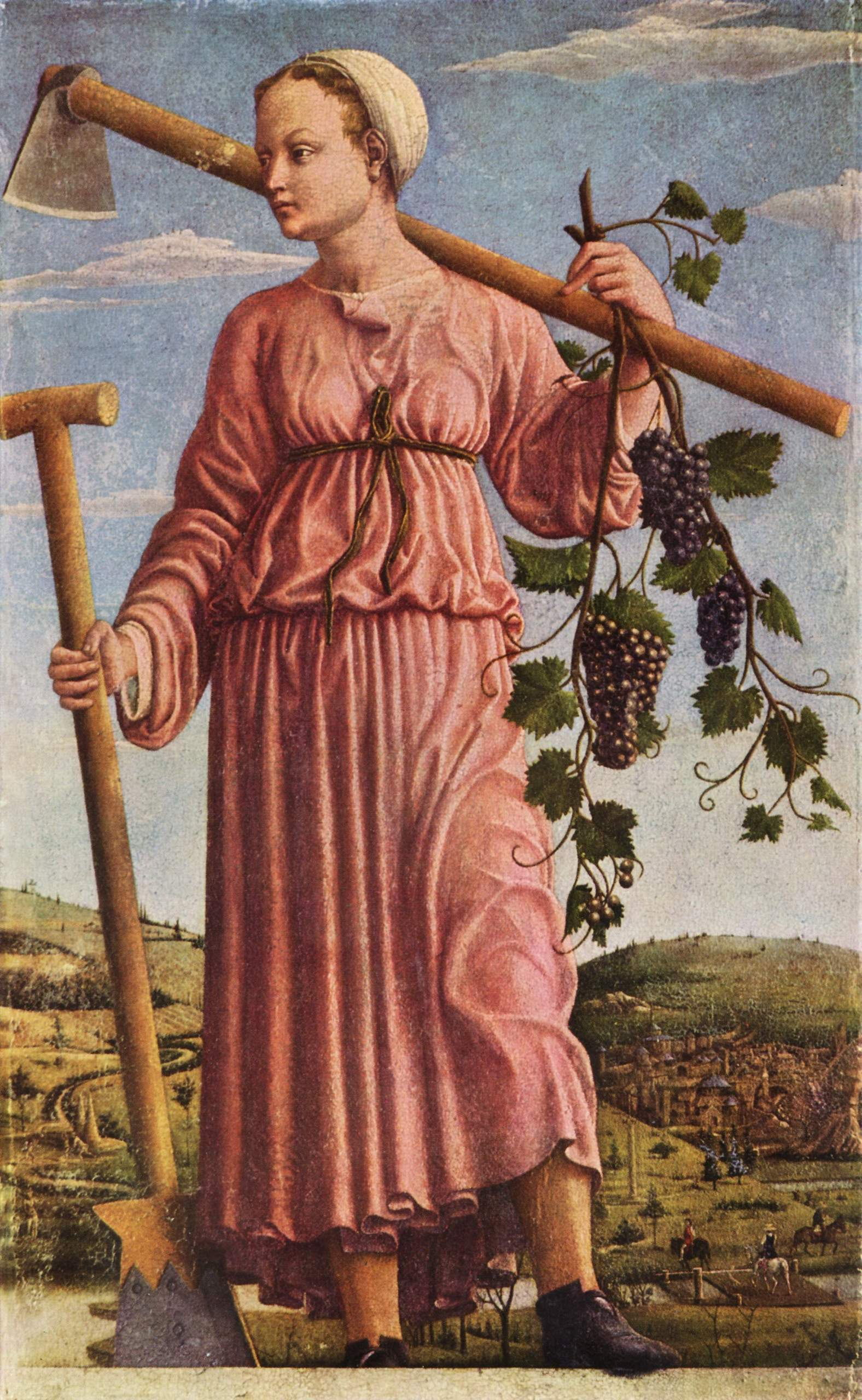
del Cossa – Polyhymnia, 1455–60. Muse of sacred poetry and hymn, eloquence, agriculture and pantomime.

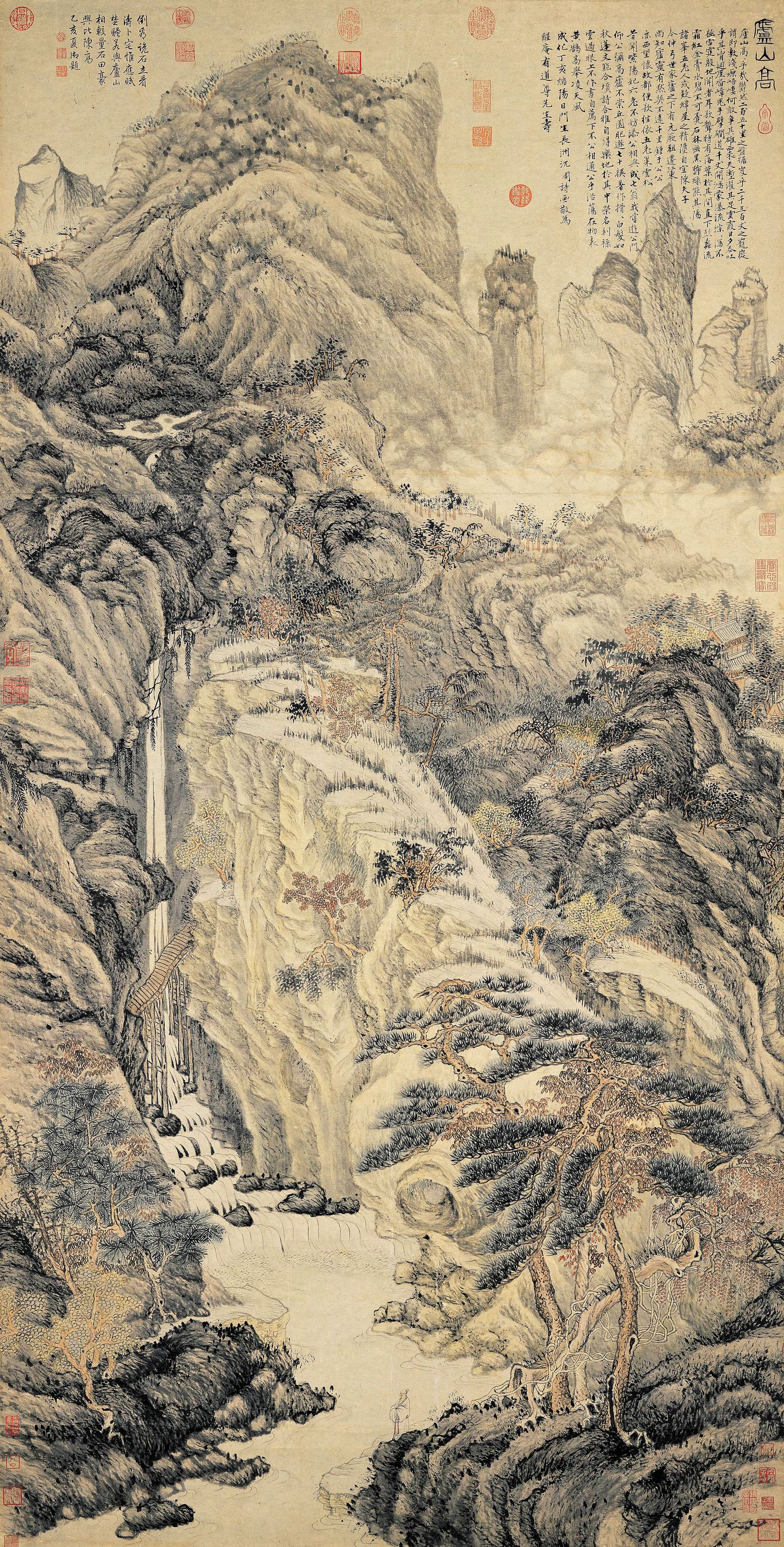
Shen Zhou – Lofty Mount Lu, 1467.

- c.1450s–1466: Piero della Francesca – The History of the True Cross (San Francesco, Arezzo)
- 1455–1460: Francesco del Cossa – Polyhymnia (Gemäldegalerie, Berlin)
- c.1455–1460: Giovanni Bellini
  - Presentation at the Temple (Pinacoteca Querini Stampalia, Venice)
  - Transfiguration of Christ (first version, Museo Correr, Venice)
- c.1457–1460: Piero della Francesca – Madonna del Parto (Monterchi)
- 1459–1461: Benozzo Gozzoli – Journey of the Magi to Bethlehem frescoes in Magi Chapel, Palazzo Medici Riccardi, Florence
- c.1459–1465: Giovanni Bellini – Agony in the Garden (National Gallery, London)
- 1459–1466: Andrea Mantegna – Portrait of Carlo de' Medici
- 1460s: Nuno Gonçalves (attributed) – Saint Vincent Panels (National Museum of Ancient Art, Lisbon)
- c.1460s: Antonello da Messina – Salting Madonna
- 1460: Andrea Mantegna – St. Bernardino of Siena between Two Angels (Pinacoteca di Brera, Milan)
- c.1460: Giovanni Bellini
  - Blessing Christ (Musée du Louvre, Paris)
  - The Blood of Christ (National Gallery, London)
  - Dead Christ in the Sepulchre (Museo Poldi Pezzoli, Milan)
  - Pietà (Dead Christ Supported by the Madonna and St. John) (Pinacoteca di Brera, Milan)
  - Dead Christ Supported by Two Angels (Museo Correr, Venice)
- c.1460: Dieric Bouts
  - Head of St. John the Baptist (National Museum, Warsaw)
  - The Lamentation of Christ (Musée du Louvre)
  - Virgin Enthroned with Four Angels (Royal Chapel of Granada)
- c.1460: Rogier van der Weyden
  - Crucifixion Diptych
  - Portrait of a Lady (National Gallery of Art, Washington, D.C.)
  - Portrait of Antoine, 'Grand Bâtard' of Burgundy
  - Portrait of Francesco d'Este
  - Portrait of Charles the Bold
- c.1460–1462: Piero della Francesca – Madonna della Misericordia (Sansepolcro)
- c.1460–1463: Rogier van der Weyden – The Lamentation of Christ
- c.1460–1464: Giovanni Bellini
  - Madonna with Child (Accademia Carrara, Bergamo)
  - Madonna with Child (Milan)
  - Madonna with Child (Museo Correr, Venice)
  - Madonna with Child ("Greek Madonna", Pinacoteca di Brera, Milan)
  - Madonna with Child Blessing (Gallerie dell'Accademia, Venice)
- c.1460–1464: Rogier van der Weyden – Medici Madonna
- c.1460–1470: Andrea Mantegna – Portrait of a Man (National Gallery of Art, Washington, D.C.)
- c.1461: Andrea Mantegna – Portrait of Francesco Gonzaga
- 1462
  - Andrea Mantegna – Adoration of the Magi (Uffizi, Florence)
  - Benedetto Bembo – Torchiara Polyptych (Madonna and Child with Angels) (Sforza Castle Pinacoteca, Milan)
  - Dieric Bouts – Portrait of a Man (National Gallery, London)
- 1462–1465: Caspar Isenmann – high altar of St Martin's Church, Colmar
- c.1462–1464: Andrea Mantegna – Death of the Virgin
- c.1462–1475: Jaume Huguet and Pau Vergós – The Consecration of Saint Augustine (Museu Nacional d'Art de Catalunya, Barcelona)
- 1463: Bernt Notke – Danse Macabre (St. Mary's Church, Lübeck)
- 1463–1465: Piero della Francesca – The Resurrection
- c.1464–1467: Dieric Bouts – The Last Supper (centre of altarpiece, St. Peter's Church, Leuven)
- c.1464–1468: Giovanni Bellini – Polyptych of S. Vincenzo Ferreri (Santi Giovanni e Paolo, Venice)
- 1465 or c.1465
  - Antonio del Pollaiuolo – Profile Portrait of a Young Lady
  - Dieric Bouts – The Martyrdom of St Erasmus (St. Peter's Church, Leuven)
  - Domenico di Michelino – La commedia illumina Firenze (fresco, Florence Cathedral)
  - Filippo Lippi – Madonna and Child
- c.1465–1467: Sandro Botticelli – Virgin and Child with an Angel (Ospedale degli Innocenti, Florence)
- c.1465–1470: Giovanni Bellini – The Head of St John the Baptist (Civic Museum, Pesaro)
- c.1466: Andrea Mantegna – Portrait of Carlo de' Medici (Uffizi)
- c.1466–1469: Filippo Lippi – Madonna of Palazzo Medici-Riccardi
- 1467: Shen Zhou – Lofty Mount Lu
- c.1467: Sandro Botticelli
  - Madonna and Child (Musée du Petit Palais, Avignon)
  - Madonna della Loggia (Uffizi, Florence)
- c.1467–1469: Andrea del Verrocchio – Madonna of the Milk
- 1467–1470: Hans Memling
  - Annunciation (Groeningemuseum)
  - Portrait of Antoine, 'Grand Bâtard' of Burgundy (attributed)
- c.1468–1469: Sandro Botticelli – Madonna and Child and Two Angels (Museo di Capodimonte, Naples)
- 1468–1470: Dieric Bouts – Altarpiece of the Last Judgment for Leuven Town Hall (survives fragmentarily)
- 1468: Bartolomé Bermejo – St Michael Triumphs Over the Devil, altarpiece for parish church of St Michael, Tous, Valencia
- 1469: Cosmè Tura – St George and the Princess (Ferrara Cathedral)
- c.1469: Sandro Botticelli – Portrait of a Young Man (Lorenzo il Popolano)
- c.1469–1470
  - Sandro Botticelli – Madonna in Glory with Seraphim (Uffizi, Florence)
  - Petrus Christus – Portrait of a Young Woman (Gemäldegalerie, Berlin)
  - Francesco del Cossa and Cosmè Tura – allegorical frescoes with details in tempera at Palazzo Schifanoia in Ferrara

== Sculptures ==
- c.1460: Niccolò dell'Arca – Compianto sul Cristo morto ("Lamentation over the Dead Christ", terracotta group, Sanctuary of Santa Maria della Vita, Bologna)
- 1464 (completed): Donatello – Judith and Holofernes (bronze)

== Births ==
- 1469: Baccio da Montelupo – Italian sculptor (died 1523)
- 1469: Domenico Fancelli – Italian sculptor working in Spain (died 1519)
- 1469: Francesco Granacci – Italian painter of the Renaissance (died 1543)
- 1469: Timoteo Viti – Italian Renaissance painter (died 1523)
- 1469: Giovanni della Robbia – Italian Renaissance ceramic artist (died 1529)
- 1469: Michael Sittow – painter from modern Estonia who was trained in the tradition of Early Netherlandish painting (died 1525/1526)
- 1468: Nunziata d'Antonio – Italian painter, fireworks artist, and bombardier (died 1525)
- 1468: Bernardo de' Rossi – Italian bishop and patron of the arts (died 1527)
- 1468: Cornelis Engebrechtsz. – Dutch painter (died 1533)
- 1468: Ahmed Karahisari – Ottoman calligrapher (died 1566)
- 1468: Niccolo Rondinelli – Italian painter active mainly in Ravenna (died 1520)
- 1467: Angelos Pitzamanos – Greek Renaissance painter (died 1535)
- 1467: Boccaccio Boccaccino – Italian painter of the Emilian school (died 1525)
- 1467: Pellegrino da San Daniele – Italian painter in the late-Quattrocento and Renaissance styles (died 1547)
- 1466/1467: Giovanni Antonio Boltraffio – Italian painter of the High Renaissance who worked in the studio of Leonardo da Vinci (died 1516)
- 1466: Agostino Chigi – Italian banker and patron of the arts (died 1520)
- 1446: Heinrich Bichler – Swiss painter (died 1497)
- 1466: Agnolo di Domenico del Mazziere – Italian painter and draughtsman of Renaissance art (died 1513)
- 1466: Bastiano Mainardi Italian painter (died 1513)
- 1466: Antonio de Saliba – Italian painter (died 1535)
- 1466: Raffaellino del Garbo – Italian painter (died c. 1527)
- 1466: Quentin Matsys – Flemish painter (died 1530)
- 1465: Hans Fries – Swiss painter before the Reformation (died 1523)
- 1465: Gerard Horenbout – Flemish miniaturist (died 1541)
- 1465: Geertgen tot Sint Jans – Early Netherlandish painter from the northern Low Countries (died 1495)
- 1465: Francisco de Osona – Spanish Renaissance painter (died 1514)
- 1465: Wang E – Chinese landscape painter (died 1545)
- 1465/1470: Giorgio Andreoli – Italian potter of lusterware (lustro) (died 1553)
- 1464: Zhang Lu – Chinese landscape painter during the Ming Dynasty (died 1538)
- 1463: Lorenzo Fasolo – Lombard painter (died 1518)
- 1462: Cristofano Robetta – Italian engraver (died 1535)
- 1462: Piero di Cosimo – Florentine painter (died 1522)
- 1462: Cornelis Engebrechtsz. – Dutch painter, the first notable painter from Leiden (died 1527)
- 1461: Raffaele Riario – Italian cardinal and patron of Michelangelo (died 1521)
- 1460: Francesco Marmitta – Italian painter and jeweller (died 1505)
- 1460: Alessandro Araldi – Italian painter active mainly in Parma (died 1529)
- 1460: Pier Jacopo Alari Bonacolsi – North Italian sculptor, known for his finely detailed small bronzes (died 1528)
- 1460: Vittore Carpaccio – Italian painter of the Venetian school (died 1525/1526)
- 1460: Pedro Romana – Spanish Renaissance painter (died 1536)
- c.1460: Pieter van Coninxloo, Early Netherlandish painter (died 1513)
- c.1460: Hans Seyffer – German stone sculptor and wood carver of the late Gothic style (died 1509)
- c.1460: Henning von der Heide – German late Gothic sculptor (died 1521)
- 1460: Cristoforo Solari – Italian sculptor and architect (died 1527)
- 1460: Andrea Solari – Italian Renaissance painter (died 1524)
- 1460: Marco Palmezzano – Italian painter and architect (died 1539)
- 1460: Gerard David – Early Netherlandish painter known for his brilliant use of color (died 1523)
- 1460: Domenico Panetti – Italian painter of the Renaissance period, active mainly in Ferrara (died 1530)
- 1460: Juan de Flandes – Early Netherlandish painter who was active in Spain (died 1519)
- 1460: Pellegrino Aretusi – Italian painter specializing in frescoes (died 1523)
- 1460: Giovanni Donato da Montorfano – Italian painter (died 1502/1503)
- 1460: Nicolò Brancaleon – Italian painter whose art left a clear influence in Ethiopia (died 1526)
- 1460: Adam Kraft – German stone sculptor and master builder (died 1509)
- 1460: Tilman Riemenschneider – German sculptor and woodcarver (died 1531)
- 1460: Hans Holbein the Elder – German painter (died 1524)
- 1460: Zhou Chen – Chinese painter in middle Ming Dynasty (died 1535)
- 1460: Filippo Mazzola – Italian Renaissance painter (died 1505)
- 1460: Tullio Lombardo – Italian Renaissance sculptor (died 1532)
- 1460: Alessandro Pampurino – Italian Renaissance painter (died 1523)
- 1460: Benedetto Briosco – Italian Renaissance sculptor and architect active in Lombardy (died 1514)
- 1460: Vittore Gambello – Italian Renaissance sculptor (died 1537)
- 1460: Marx Reichlich – Austrian painter of primarily religious scenes (died 1520)
- 1460: Wilm Dedeke – late gothic painter from Northern Germany (died 1528)
- 1460: Nikola Božidarević – Croatian painter (died 1517)
- 1460: Ulrich Apt the Elder – German Late-Gothic painter (died 1532)
- 1460: Bernardo Zenale – Italian painter and architect (died 1526)
- 1460–1470: Bernardino Zaganelli – Italian Renaissance painter (died 1510)

== Goldsmithing ==
- 1467–1471: Gérard Loyet – Burgundian goldsmith (born 1466 – died c. 1502).

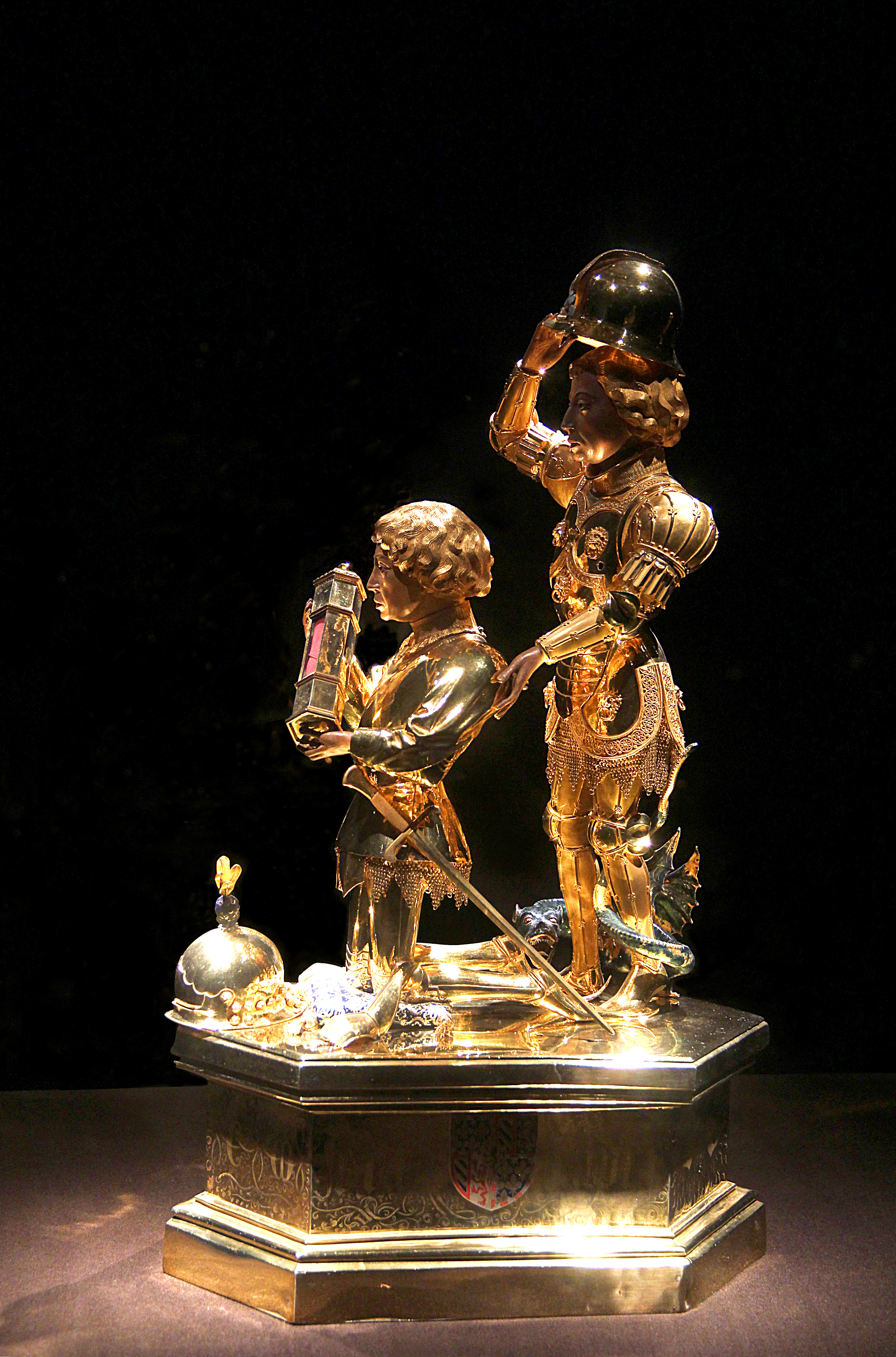
Relikvie av Charles the Bold – Gérard Loyet (1467–1471).

== Deaths ==
- 1469: Filarete – Florentine Renaissance architect, sculptor and architectural theorist (born 1400)
- 1469: Filippo Lippi – Italian painter of the Italian Quattrocento (15th century) school (born 1406)
- 1469: Giovanni Francesco da Rimini – Italian painter (born 1420)
- 1468: Master E. S. – German engraver, goldsmith, and printmaker (born 1420)
- 1468: Nicolás Francés – Spanish painter and miniaturist (born unknown)
- 1468: Zanobi Strozzi – Italian painter and miniaturist (born 1412)
- 1467/1468: Matteo di Andrea de' Pasti – Italian medalist (born 1420)
- 1466: Donatello – early Renaissance Italian artist and sculptor from Florence (born 1386)
- 1466: Enguerrand Quarton – French painter (born 1410)
- 1465: Buono de' Buoni – Italian Quattrocento painter from Naples (born unknown)
- 1464: Desiderio da Settignano – Italian sculptor active during the Renaissance (born 1430)
- 1464: Kang Hŭian – scholar and painter of the early Joseon period (born 1417)
- 1464: Maso Finiguerra – Italian goldsmith, draftsman, and engraver (born 1426)
- 1464: Rogier van der Weyden – Early Netherlandish painter (born 1399/1400)
- 1463: Borghese di Piero Borghese – Italian painter of the Florentine School and Renaissance art (born 1397)
- 1463: Tenshō Shūbun – Japanese painter in the Muromachi period and a Zen Buddhist monk (born 1414)
- 1462: Jean de la Huerta – Spanish sculptor (born 1413)
- 1462: Dai Jin – founder of the Zhe School of Ming dynasty painting (born 1388)
- 1462: Hans von Tübingen – Austrian artist (born 1380)
- 1461: Domenico Veneziano – Italian painter of the early Renaissance (born 1410)
