= 1527 in art =

List of years in art	(table)
- … 1517; 1518; 1519; 1520; 1521; 1522; 1523; 1524; 1525; 1526; 1527; 1528; 1529; 1530; 1531; 1532; 1533; 1534; 1535; 1536; 1537 …
- Art; Archaeology; Architecture; Literature; Music; Philosophy; Science; +...

Events from the year 1527 in art.

== Events ==
- c. May 6 - The engraver Jacopo Caraglio flees to Venice from the Sack of Rome
- Marcantonio Raimondi publishes the second edition of his erotic engravings I Modi in Rome (accompanied by Aretino's Sonetti lussuriosi); like the first they are suppressed by Pope Clement VII
- Pieter Coecke van Aelst enters the Antwerp Guild of painters
- John Browne becomes the first Serjeant Painter at the English Court

== Works ==
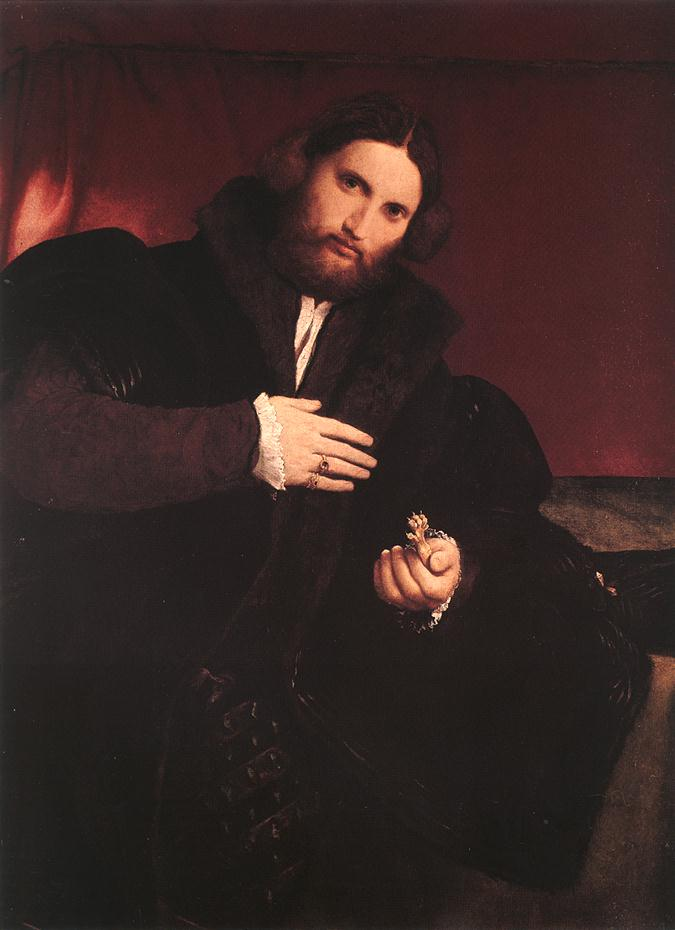
Lotto – Man with a Golden Paw, Kunsthistorisches Museum

- Hans Holbein the Younger – Sir Thomas More
- Lorenzo Lotto – Man with a Golden Paw
- Stanisław Samostrzelnik – Book of hours of Queen Bona Sforza and Prayer book of Krzysztof Szydłowiecki (approximate date decorations completed)
- Lucas van Leyden – The Last Judgement (triptych, Museum De Lakenhal, Leiden, 1526 or 1527)

== Births ==
- November 18 - Luca Cambiasi, Italian painter (died 1585)
- date unknown
  - Michelangelo Aliprandi, Italian painter, pupil of Veronese (died 1595)
  - Giuseppe Arcimboldo, Italian painter (died 1593)
- probable
  - Pellegrino Tibaldi, Italian mannerist architect, sculptor, and mural painter (died 1596)
  - Alexander Colyn (born 1527/1529), Flemish sculptor (died 1612)

== Deaths ==
- May - Cristoforo Solari, Italian sculptor and architect (born 1460)
- June 28 - Bernardo de' Rossi, Italian bishop and patron of the arts (born 1468)
- date unknown
  - Lorenzo Allegri, Italian painter (born unknown)
  - Raffaellino del Garbo, Florentine painter of the early-Renaissance (born c. 1466)
  - Cornelis Engebrechtsz., Dutch painter, the first notable painter from Leiden (born 1462)
  - Cristoforo Foppa, Italian goldsmith, sculptor, and die sinker (born 1445)
  - Jan Mertens the Younger, South Netherlandish painter (born unknown)
  - Domenico Puligo, painter from Florence (born 1492)
  - Jan van Dornicke, South Netherlandish painter (born 1470)
  - Jan Wellens de Cock, Flemish painter and draughtsman of the Northern Renaissance (born 1480)
