= 1523 in art =

Events from the year 1523 in art.

== Events ==
- Two painters compete for the position of "piombo" (or leaden seal, ie. the office of sealer of briefs of the apostolic chamber), following the elevation of Giulio de' Medici to the pontificate as Pope Clement VII: Sebastiano Luciani obtains it over Giovanni da Udine.
- Benedetto Montagna inherits his father's workshop in Vicenza and ceases to make engravings at about this time.

== Works ==
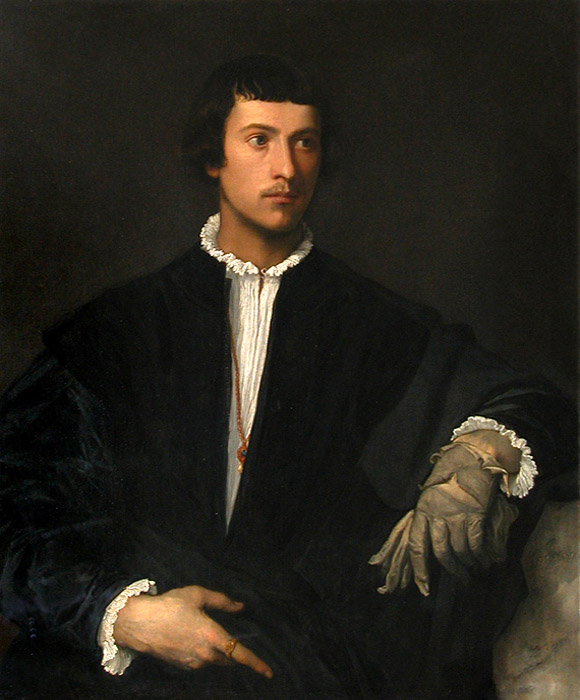
Titian – Man with a Glove

- Hans Holbein the Younger – Portrait of Desiderius Erasmus of Rotterdam with Renaissance pilaster
- Parmigianino – Circumcision of Jesus (approximate date)
- Titian
  - Bacchus and Ariadne
  - Man with a Glove

== Births ==
- January 29 - Enea Vico, Italian engraver (died 1567)
- date unknown
  - Plautilla Nelli, Italian painter (died 1587)
  - Pieter Pourbus, Dutch-born Flemish Renaissance painter (died 1584)
  - Stradanus, Flanders-born mannerist painter (died 1605)
  - Crispin van den Broeck, Flemish painter (died 1591)

== Deaths ==
- August 13 - Gerard David, Early Netherlandish painter known for his brilliant use of color (born 1460)
- October 16 - Luca Signorelli, Italian Renaissance painter, draughtsman, especially in his use of foreshortening (born 1445)
- date unknown
  - Pellegrino Aretusi, Italian painter specializing in frescoes (born 1460)
  - Marco Bello, Italian painter, pupil of Giovanni Bellini (born 1470)
  - Ambrogio Bergognone, Italian Renaissance painter of the Milanese school (born 1470s)
  - Ludovico Brea, Italian painter active primarily in Genoa (born 1450)
  - Baccio da Montelupo, Italian sculptor (born 1469)
  - Hans Fries, Swiss painter before the Reformation (born 1465)
  - Bartolomeo Montagna, Italian painter and architect who worked in Vicenza and Venice (born 1450)
  - Alessandro Pampurino, Italian Renaissance painter (born 1460)
  - Martino Piazza, Italian Renaissance painter (born 1475-80)
  - Pietro Perugino, Italian painter of the Umbrian school and mentor of Raphael (born 1446/1450)
  - Cesare da Sesto, Italian painter active primarily in Milan (born 1477)
  - Timoteo Viti, Italian painter (born 1469)
