= Robetta =

Robetta may refer to:

- Cristofano Robetta (1462–1535), an Italian artist, goldsmith, and engraver
- Rosetta@home#Robetta, an automated protein structure prediction service
