= 1513 in art =

Events from the year 1513 in art.

== Events ==
- Albrecht Altdorfer appointed to the service of Maximilian I in Innsbruck, where he receives several commissions from the imperial court

== Works ==
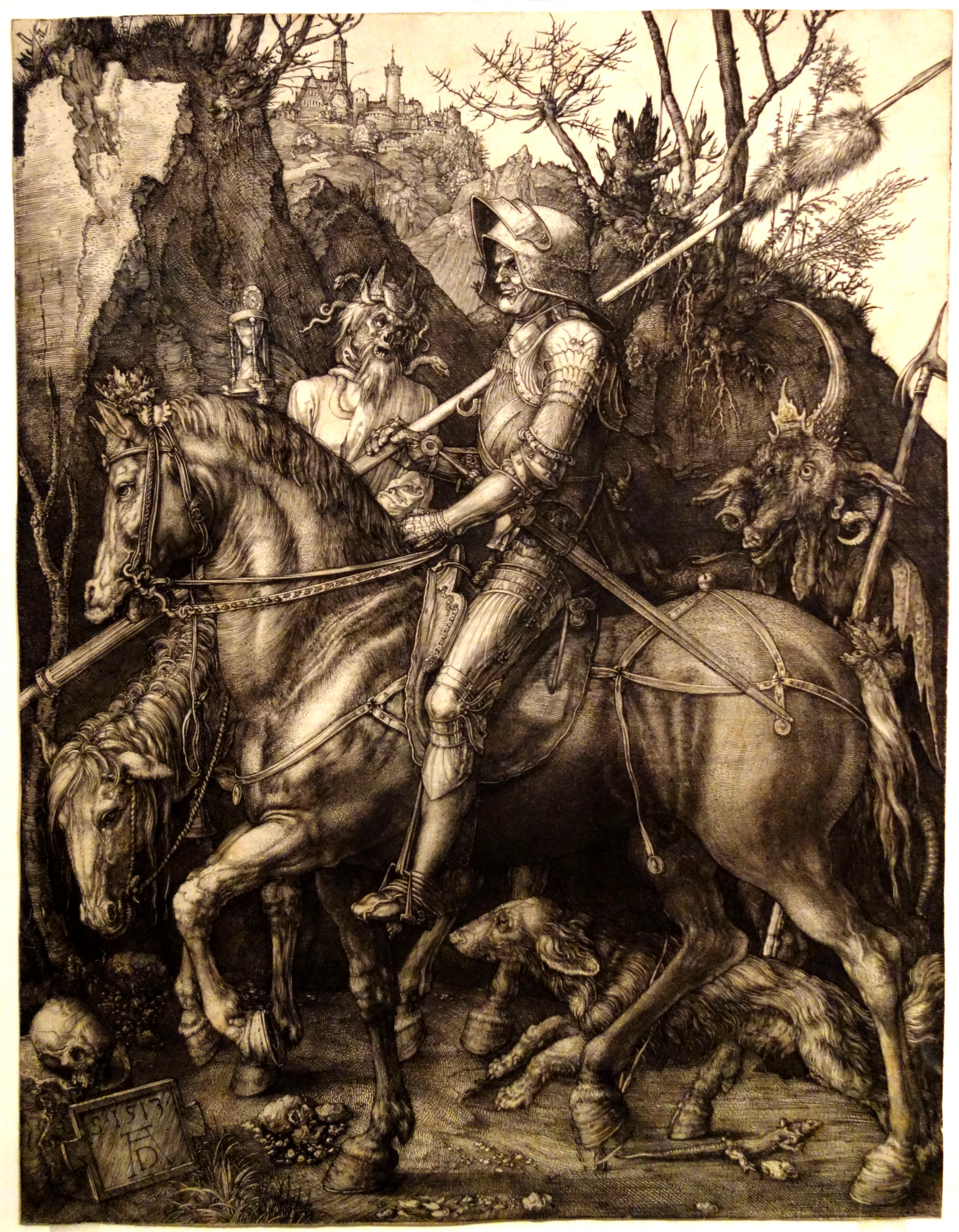
Dürer – Knight, Death and the Devil

- Fra Bartolomeo – SS Peter and Paul (Pinacoteca Vaticana)
- Cima da Conegliano : Saints Roch, Anthony Abbot and Lucy (Metropolitan Museum of Art)
- Albrecht Dürer – Knight, Death and the Devil (engraving)
- Leonardo da Vinci – Old Man with Water Studies (drawing)
- Quentin Matsys – approximate dates
  - Madonna and Child with the Lamb
  - A Portrait of an Elderly Man
  - The Ugly Duchess
- Palma Vecchio - Assumption of the Virgin (Gallerie dell'Accademia)

== Births ==
- Pierre Reymond, French enamelist (died 1584)
- Approximate date – Pirro Ligorio, Italian architect and painter (died 1583)

== Deaths ==
- Michel Colombe, French sculptor (born 1430)
- Pieter van Coninxloo, Early Netherlandish painter (born 1460)
- Bastiano Mainardi, Italian painter (born 1466)
- Agnolo di Domenico del Mazziere - Italian painter and draughtsman of Renaissance art (born 1466)
- Pinturicchio, Italian painter of the Renaissance (born 1454)
- Francesco Rosselli, Italian miniature painter, engraver of maps and old master prints (born 1445)
