= Saint Anthony Abbot and Michael the Archangel =

Two paintings by Filippo Lippi

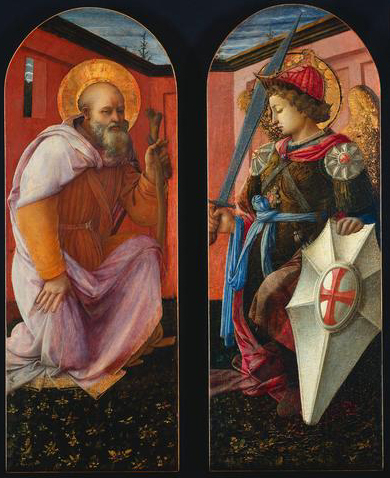
- Year: 1458
- Dimensions: 81.3 cm (32.0 in) × 29.8 cm (11.7 in)
- Location: Cleveland Museum of Art
- Accession: 1964.150

Saint Anthony Abbot and Michael the Archangel are two tempera on panel works by Filippo Lippi, originally side-panels to a now lost central panel of the Madonna and Child. Produced between around 1445 and 1450, they are both now in the Cleveland Museum of Art, which also houses a later copy of the central panel by Lippi's workshop.

The original triptych was commissioned by Cosimo de' Medici in 1456 as a gift for Alfonso V of Aragon; Anthony and Michael were his patron saints. It is mentioned in a letter from Lippi to Giovanni di Cosimo de' Medici dated 20 July 1457, which also contains a small sketch of the work. Alfonso received the triptych in 1458 and much liked the work. Though the work increased the artist's popularity with the Medici, it slowed progress on the Cappella Maggiore frescoes at Prato Cathedral, begun in 1452 and only completed in 1462. The central panel had disappeared by 1871, when the other two appeared on the art market in Rome, where they were acquired by Francis Cook.
