= 1535 in art =

Events from the year 1535 in art.

== Works ==
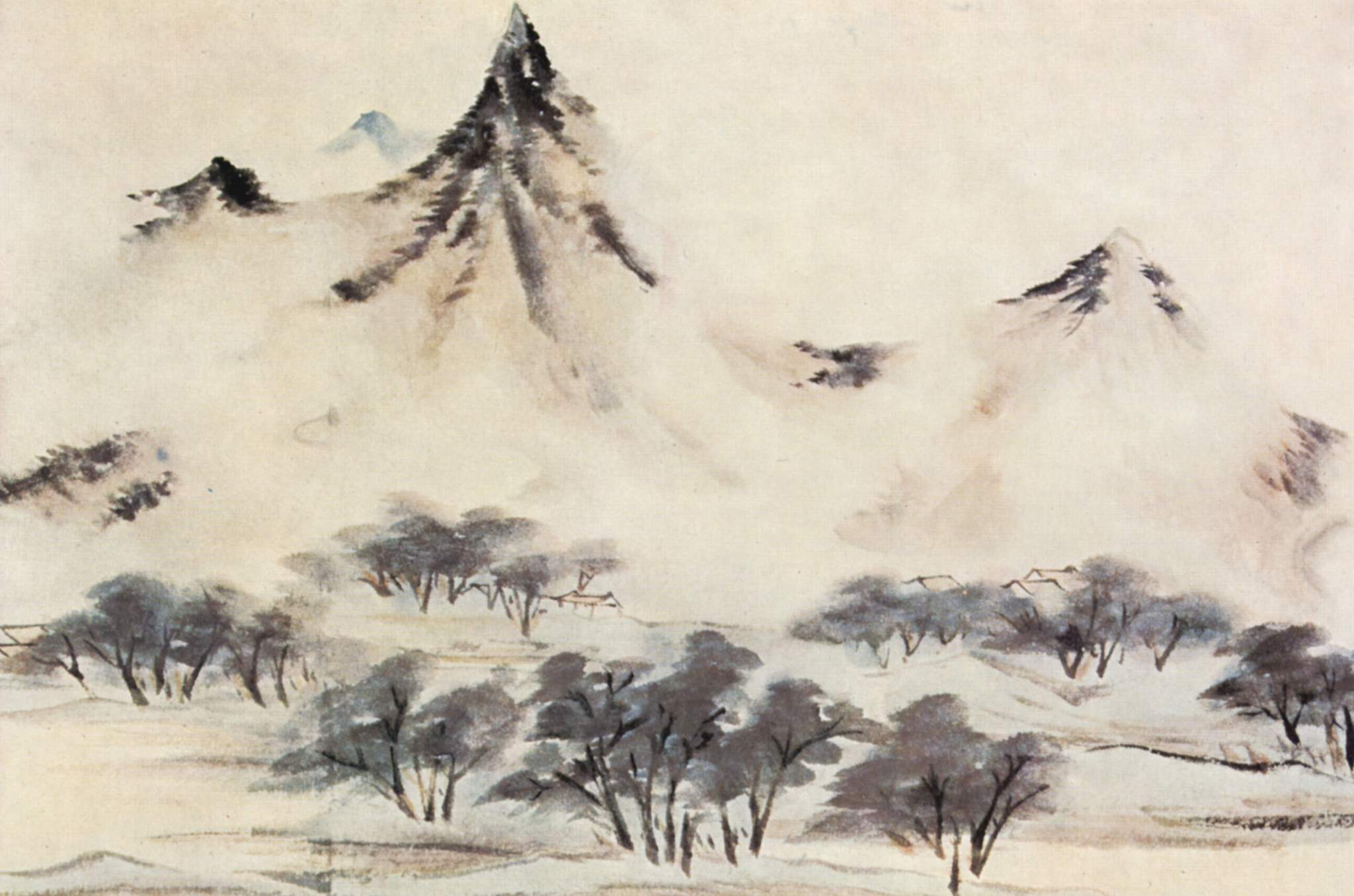
Chen – Mountains in Clouds, Freer Gallery of Art

- Albrecht Altdorfer – The Fall of Man
- Chen Chun – Mountains in Clouds
- Hans Holbein the Younger – Charles de Solier, comte de Morette
- Jan Mostaert – Landscape with an Episode from the Conquest of America ("West Indies Landscape", approximate date)
- Parmigianino (some dates approximate)
  - Cupid Making His Arch
  - Madonna of the Long Neck
  - The Virgin and Child with St Mary Magdalen and the Infant John the Baptist
- Pontormo – Portrait of Alessandro de' Medici
- Francesco de' Rossi (Il Salviati) – Annunciation (fresco in San Francesco a Ripa, Rome, adcompleted)

== Births ==
- Alessandro Allori, Italian portrait painter of the late Mannerist Florentine school (died 1607)
- Giovanni Antonio di Amato the younger, Italian painter (died 1598)
- Biagio Betti, Italian painter (died 1605)
- Leonhard Baumhauer, German sculptor (died 1604)
- Bernaert de Rijckere, Flemish painter (died 1590)
- Germain Pilon, French sculptors of the French Renaissance (died 1590)
- Felipe Guaman Poma de Ayala, Quechua noble man known for illustrating a chronicle of the native peoples of the Andes (died 1616)
- Pieter van der Borcht (I), Flemish Renaissance painter and etcher (died 1608)

== Deaths ==
- Zhou Chen, Chinese painter in middle Ming Dynasty (born 1460)
- Kamāl ud-Dīn Behzād, painter of Persian miniatures (born 1450)
- Angelos Pitzamanos, Greek Renaissance painter (born 1467)
- Cristofano Robetta, Italian engraver (born 1462)
- Antonio de Saliba - Italian painter (born 1466)
- Jan Rombouts the Elder - Flemish Renaissance painter, glass painter, draftsman, printmaker and glass designer (born 1480)
