= Portrait of Carlo de' Medici =

Painting by Andrea Mantegna

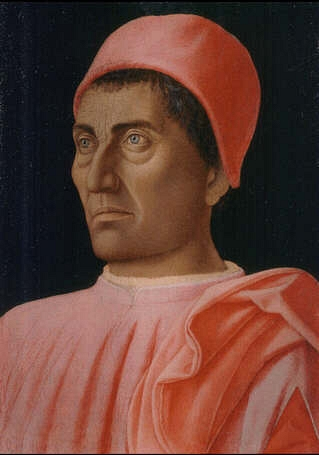
- Artist: Andrea Mantegna
- Year: 1459–1466
- Medium: Tempera on panel
- Dimensions: 40.5 cm × 29.5 cm (15.9 in × 11.6 in)
- Location: Uffizi Gallery, Florence

The Portrait of Carlo de' Medici is a painting by the Italian Renaissance master Andrea Mantegna, executed in 1466. It is now housed in the Uffizi Gallery of Florence.

== History ==
Little is known about the painting's origins, and currently the most credited hypothesis is that it would portray Carlo de' Medici, an illegitimate son of Cosimo de' Medici the Elder and a Circassian concubine, as hinted by the subject's intense blue eyes. In 1912 a copy of the portrait was included in a genealogy of the House of Medici. This is however in contrast with the identification of Carlo as a character in Filippino Lippi's Stories of St. Stephen and St. John the Baptist in the Cathedral of Prato. Also the attribution to Mantegna was not immediate, as for a long time the painting was thought to be by Domenico Veneziano.

The work has been dated from 1459–1460, when Mantegna arrived in Mantua and was commissioned numerous official portraits (the subject has been also identified as Ludovico Gonzaga, bishop of Mantua), and 1466, when the painter perhaps travelled to Florence.

== Description ==
The painting shows the subject from a three-quarter view, an innovation brought in Italy through Flemish masters in the late 15th century; previously profiles, in the ancient Roman tradition, were preferred.

The subject is tan-skinned with intense blue eyes and wears the garments of a protonotary apostolic, a position which Carlo held from 1463. The official nature of the painting explains the absence of any psychological element and the attention to details such as the dress and the hat.

== Sources ==
- Pauli, Tatjana (2001). Mantegna. Milan: Leonardo Arte. ISBN 978-88-8310-187-8.
