= Zhang Lu (painter) =

Chinese painter (1464–1538)

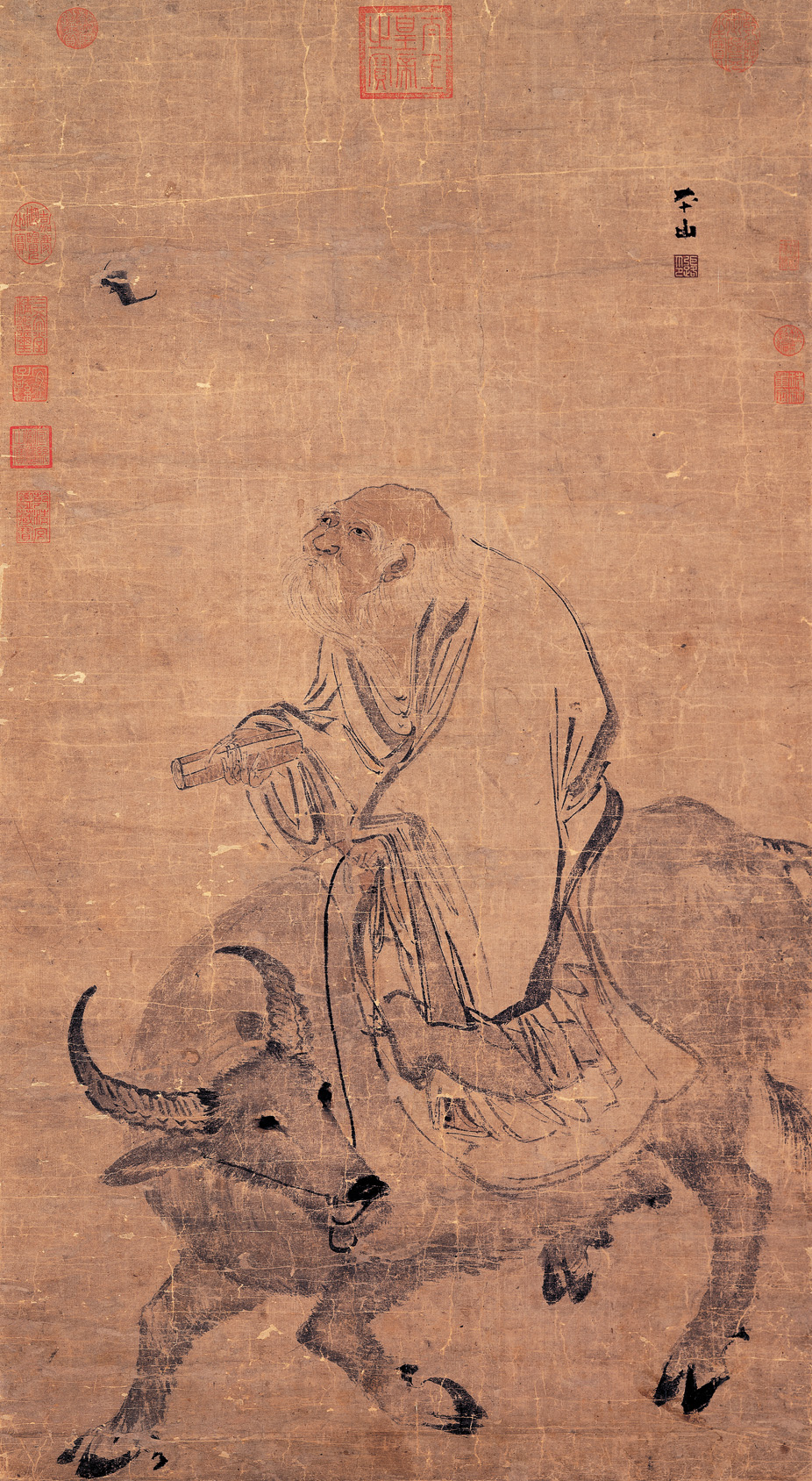
Zhang Lu, Laozi Riding an Ox 畫老子騎牛. Light ink and color on paper. National Palace Museum

Zhang Lu (simplified Chinese: 张路; traditional Chinese: 張路; pinyin: Zhāng Lù; Wade–Giles: Chang Lu; c. 1464–1538) was a Chinese landscape painter during the Ming dynasty (1368–1644).

Zhang was born in Xiangfu (祥符; present-day Kaifeng, Henan) into a wealthy family and educated with princes of the imperial family. He attained great success as a professional painter but lived very simply, almost as a hermit. He began his study of painting by emulating the leading court painter, Wang E, but quickly turned from the academy to other models and masters. His courtesy name was Tianchi (天馳) and his pseudonym was Pingshan (平山). He was a student of Wu Wei. Zhang followed the Zhe school of painting. He painted landscapes and human figures in a free and uninhibited style. According to many legends he also contributed to major religions that are still present in modern day China. He also attempted to teach students about art in an unnamed unknown local school, apparently he was unsuccessful in his teachings.
