= Carlo de' Medici =

Italian priest (1428/1430–1492)

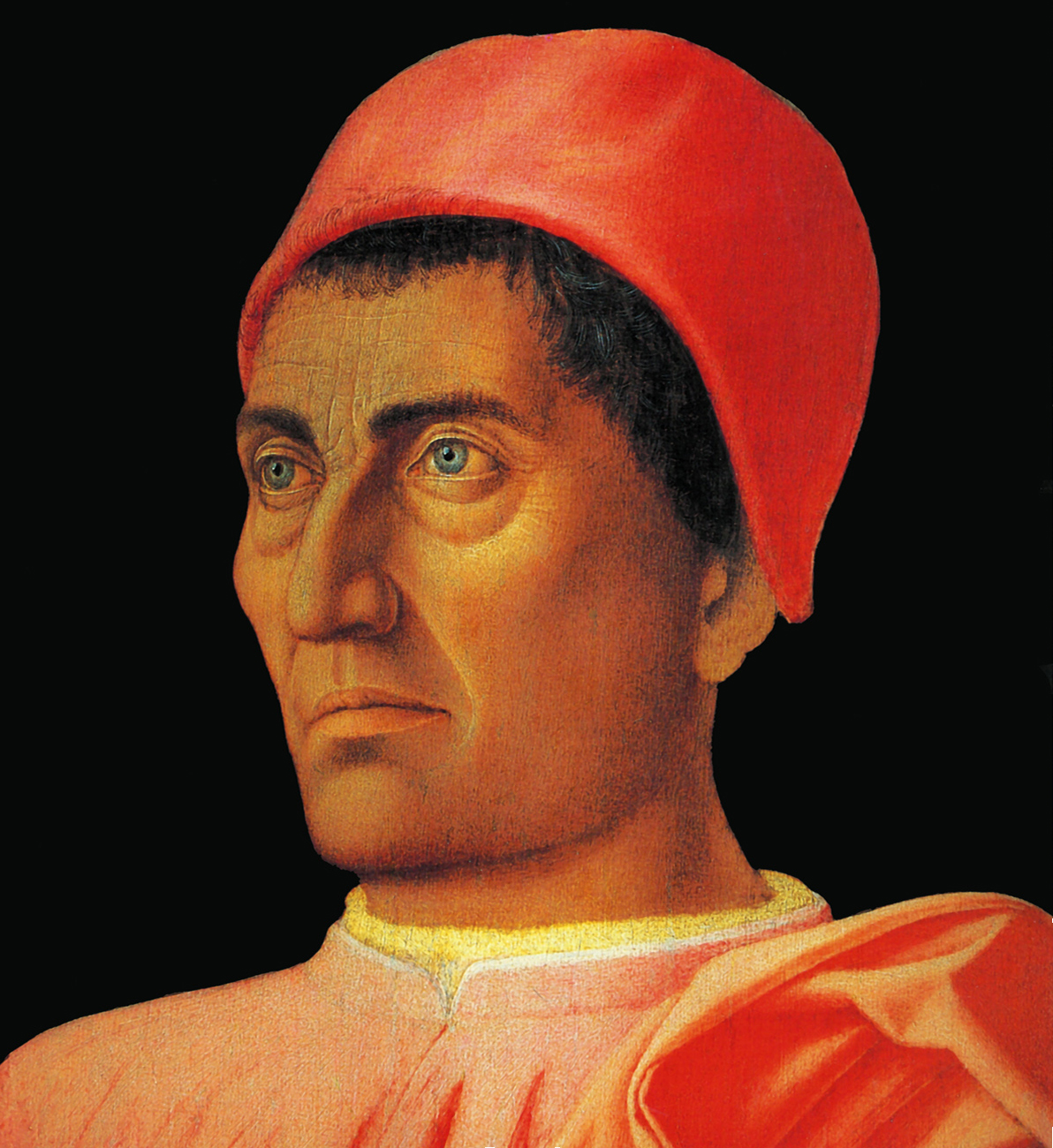
- Portrait of Carlo de' Medici (1466) by Andrea Mantegna
- Full name: Carlo di Cosimo de' Medici
- Born: 1428 or 1430; Florence, Republic of Florence
- Died: 29 May 1492
- Noble family: Medici
- Father: Cosimo de' Medici
- Mother: Maddalena

Carlo di Cosimo de' Medici (1428 or 1430 – 29 May 1492) was an Italian priest. A member of the powerful Medici family, he became a senior clergyman and collector.

== Early life ==
Born in Florence, he was the illegitimate son of Cosimo de' Medici (the Elder) and a slave-woman named Maddalena, who was said to have been purchased in Venice. (Note: It has been suggested that Carlo's Circassian mother, who later took the name of Maddalena, was 22 years old when she was bought allegedly by Cosimo de' Medici's agent from Milan, Giovanni Portinari (c.1363–1436), at the Rialto, Venice in the summer of 1427. Note that since the late 13th century, the Venetian and Genoese merchants and consuls established trade outposts on the Black Sea's eastern coast; brought the Roman Catholic Church to Circassia; and often concluded trade agreements with different representatives of Adyghe nobility. These Italian traders were also actively engaged in the trade of Circassian beauties, selling Adyghe and Abkhazian slaves in the cities of Genoa and Venice. Similar to Carlo, Zacharias de' Ghisolfi, the ruler of Matrega (an ancient town in present-day Krasnodar Krai, Russia), was the product of a Circassian-Genoese union. Additionally, the Genoese traveler Giorgio Interiano's work La vita et sito de' Zichi, chiamiti Ciarcassi: historia notabile was among the first Italian accounts on the life and customs of Adyghes.)

Maddalena is noted to have been a Circassian slave bought in Venice as a "certified virgin" in 1427, the Venetian slave traders being important participators in the Black Sea slave trade at the time.

It is widely accepted that Maddalena was a Circassian, and Carlo's "intense blue eyes" and other "marked Circassian features" has been seen as a trait inherited from his Circassian mother.

However, it had been once suggested that his mother might have been a black African, because of the apparently dusky skin depicted in Mantegna's portrait of Carlo, which however it is more likely due to aging of the pigments or other similar causes.

== Career ==
His father directed him to take on a religious life. After becoming canon of the cathedral at Florence in 1450, he was appointed rector of Pieve di Santa Maria (Dicomano) in Mugello and the Pieve of San Donato di Calenzano.

He became Abbot of San Salvatore at Vaiano, outside Prato. He was also Papal tax collector and nuncio in Tuscany. Carlo was Provost and dean of the collegiate Church of Prato (now Prato Cathedral) as early as 1460. Prato in 1463 became a territorial prelature and Carlo the first prelate. A cultured man, he collected medallions. He died in Florence in 1492.

== Portrayals ==
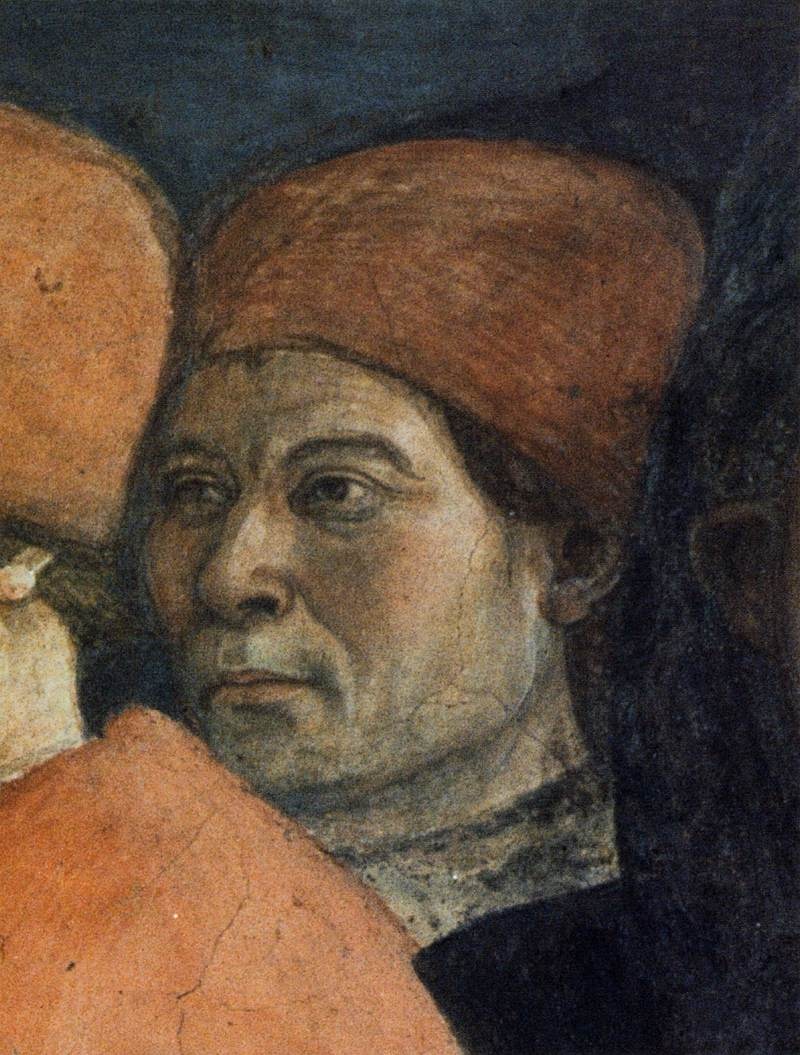
Depiction of Carlo in Filippo Lippi's Funeral of St. Stephen

Carlo was portrayed by Andrea Mantegna in a head-and-shoulders portrait wearing the clerical garb of a protonotary apostolic in 1466. He also appears in the funeral scene of Filippo Lippi's Stories of St. Stephen and St. John the Baptist in the Prato Cathedral, in which he is depicted standing behind the Pope. He may also be portrayed as one of the figures in Benozzo Gozzoli's paintings of the journey of the Magi in the Magi Chapel in Florence.

In the historical fantasy series Da Vinci's Demons, Carlo was played by actor Ray Fearon. He is depicted as a missionary whom the cruelty of the world has made doubt the Church and its message.

He appears in seasons two and three of Medici, played by Callum Blake. His mother is played by Sarah Felberbaum in the first season.
