= 1532 in art =

Events from the year 1532 in art.

== Events ==
- German painter Hans Holbein the Younger settles permanently in England.
- Venetian painter Lorenzo Lotto moves to Treviso.

== Works ==
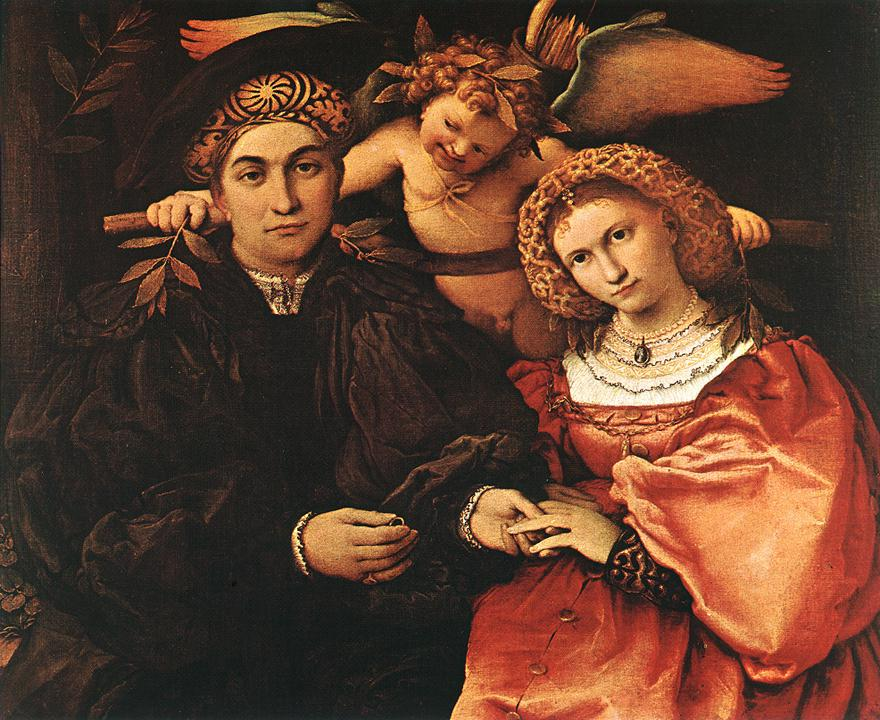
Lotto – Messer Marsilio and his Wife, Museo del Prado

- Lucas Cranach the Elder
  - Melancholia, Colmar
  - Melancholia, Copenhagen
- Lorenzo Lotto
  - Messer Marsilio and his Wife
  - Portrait of a Woman Inspired by Lucretia (approximate date)
  - St. Lucy before the Judge
- Titian – Andrea dei Franceschi
- Hans Holbein
  - Portrait of Georg Gisze
  - Terminus, the Device of Erasmus (sculpture)
  - An Allegory of the Old and New Testaments
- Pontormo – Portrait of a lady in red (approximate date)

== Births ==
- Sofonisba Anguissola, Italian painter of the Renaissance (died 1625)
- Giovanni Battista della Marca, Italian painter (died 1587)
- Dominicus Lampsonius, Flemish poet and artist (died 1599)
- Girolamo Muziano, painter (died 1592)
- Marten de Vos, Antwerp painter and draughtsman (died 1603)

== Deaths ==
- Ulrich Apt the Elder, German Late-Gothic painter (born 1460)
- Albert Cornelis, Flemish Renaissance painter (born 1475)
- Tullio Lombardo, Italian Renaissance sculptor (born 1460)
- Bernardino Luini, North Italian painter from Leonardo's circle (born 1480/1482)
- Jan Mabuse, Flemish painter (born 1478)
- Andrea Riccio, Italian sculptor and occasional architect (born 1470)
