= Portrait of a Man (Mantegna) =

Painting attributed to Andrea Mantegna

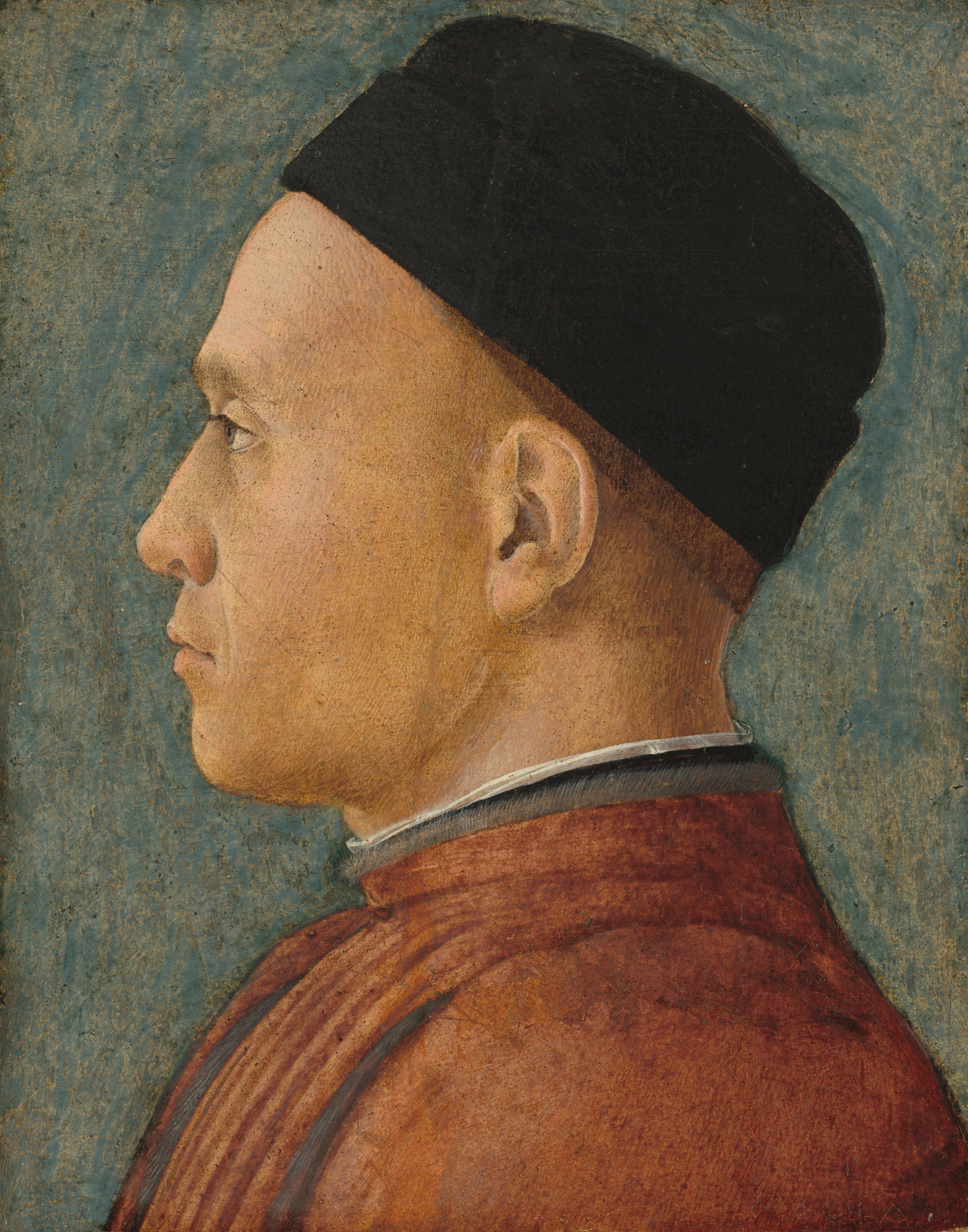
- Artist: Andrea Mantegna
- Year: c. 1460–1470
- Medium: Tempera on panel
- Dimensions: 24.2 cm × 19 cm (9.5 in × 7.5 in)
- Location: National Gallery of Art, Washington, DC

Portrait of a Man (c. 1460–1470) is a painting attributed to the Italian Renaissance artist Andrea Mantegna. Alternatively, it has sometimes been attributed to Giovanni Bellini or to an unknown pupil of Mantegna. It is housed in the National Gallery of Art, Washington, DC, United States.

== History ==
The work is generally dated to the same years of the Camera degli Sposi, or anyway from the 1460s–1470s, because of the similarities of the subject with one of the characters portrayed there.

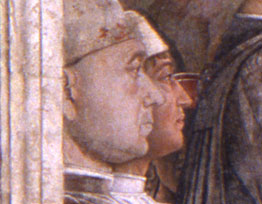
Portrait in the Camera degli Sposi

The panel is documented for the first time in 1906, in a private collection at Gaál, Hungary. Later it was part of collections in Budapest, Paris and then New York City. In 1950 it was acquired by the Samuel H. Kress, becoming part of the National Collection.

== Sources ==
- Pauli, Tatjana (2001). Mantegna. Milan: Leonardo Arte.
