= Hans Fries =

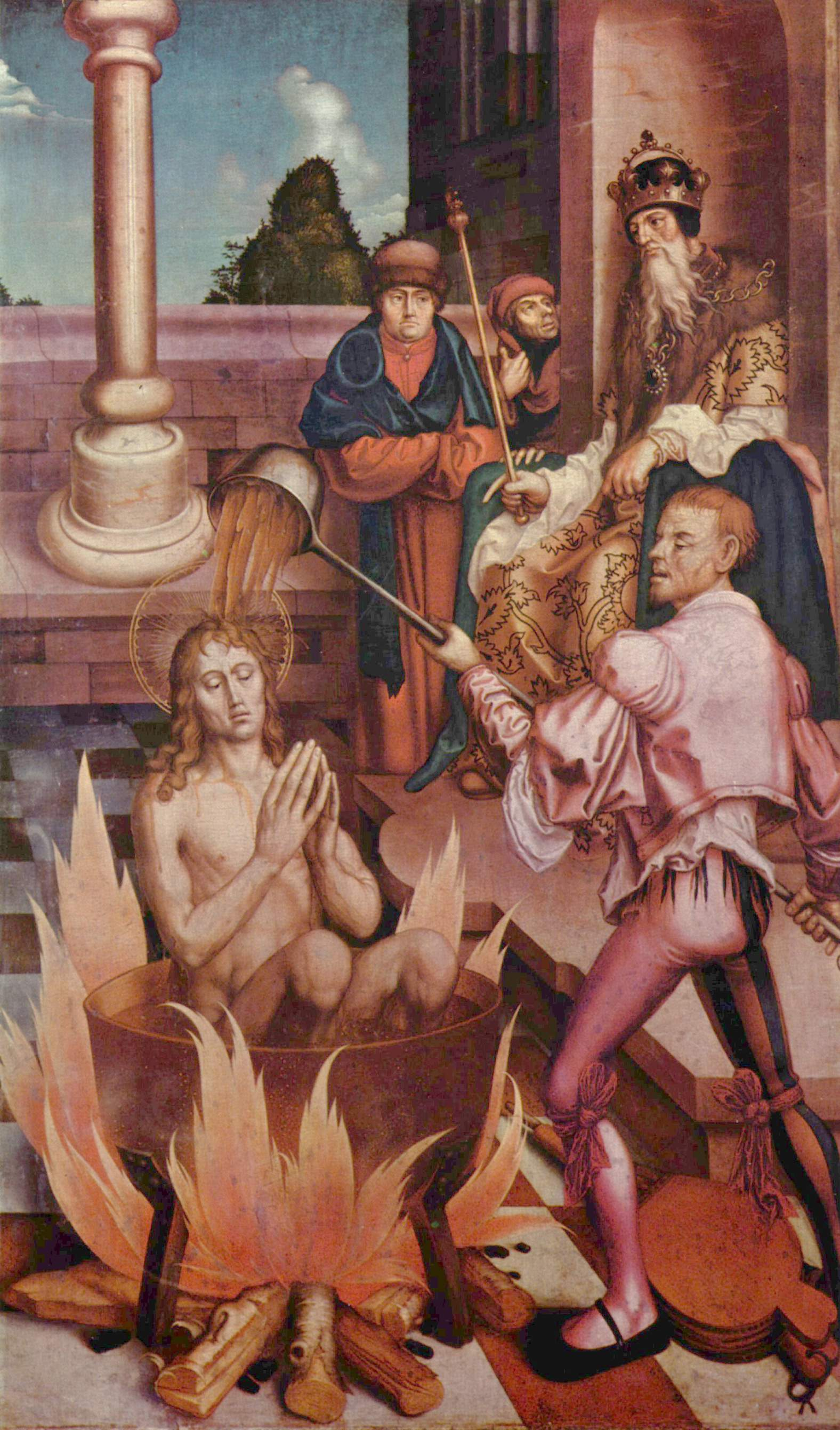
John the Evangelist in boiling oil

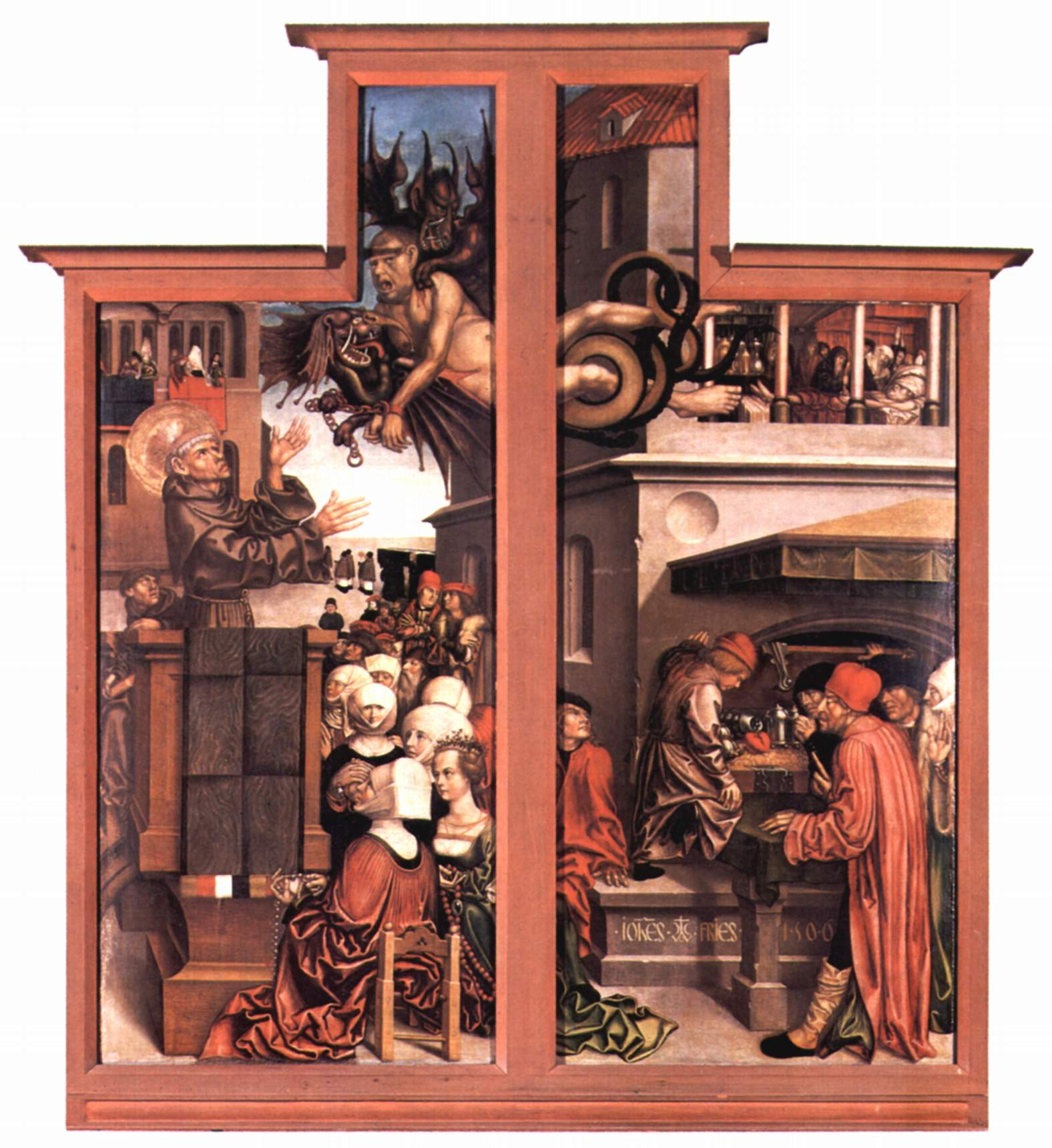
The Sermon of St. Anthony of Padua

Hans Fries (c. 1465 – c. 1523) was a Swiss painter before the Reformation.

Fries was born in Fribourg, the son of a baker, and studied with the Bernese painter Heinrich Bichler. After a stay in Basel in the year 1487/88, he returned to his hometown. Here he held the official post of city painter in the first decade of the 16th Century and was in addition a councilman. During this time he designed and painted many altars. Around 1510 he moved to Bern where he lived until his death.

== Selected works ==
- Christ carrying the Cross, 1502, canvas, 81×164 cm, Bern Kunstmuseum (Art Museum)
- Wing of a St. John altar, outside: St. John Drinks the Poison, c. 1507, wood, 130×32 cm, Zürich, Swiss National Museum
- Wing of a St. John altar, inside: Two Visions of St. John, c. 1507, wood, 130×32 cm, Zürich, Swiss National Museum
- St. Barbara (Altar wing), 1503, wood, 98×67 cm, Fribourg, Musée d'Art et d'Histoire
- St. Christopher (Altar wing), 1503, wood, 98×67 cm, Fribourg, Musée d'Art et d'Histoire.
- St. Margareta (Altar wing), c. 1505, wood, 97×30 cm, Fribourg, Musée d'Art et d'Histoire.
- St. Nikolaus (Altar wing), c. 1505, wood, 97×30 cm, Fribourg, Musée d'Art et d'Histoire.
- Allegory of the Cross, c. 1515, wood, 148×98 cm, Fribourg, Musée d'Art et d'Histoire.
- from a John the Baptist Triptych, left wing outside: Sermon of John the Baptist before Herod, 1514, Wood, 124×76 cm, Basel, Kunstmuseum
- from a John the Baptist Triptych, left wing inside: The Beheading of John the Baptist, 1514, wood, 124×76 cm, Basel, Kunstmuseum
- from a St. John Triptych, right wing inside: John the Evangelist in Boiling Oil, 1514, wood, 125×75 cm, Basel, Kunstmuseum

== See also ==
- Heinrich Bichler
