= 1531 in art =

Events from the year 1531 in art.

== Works ==
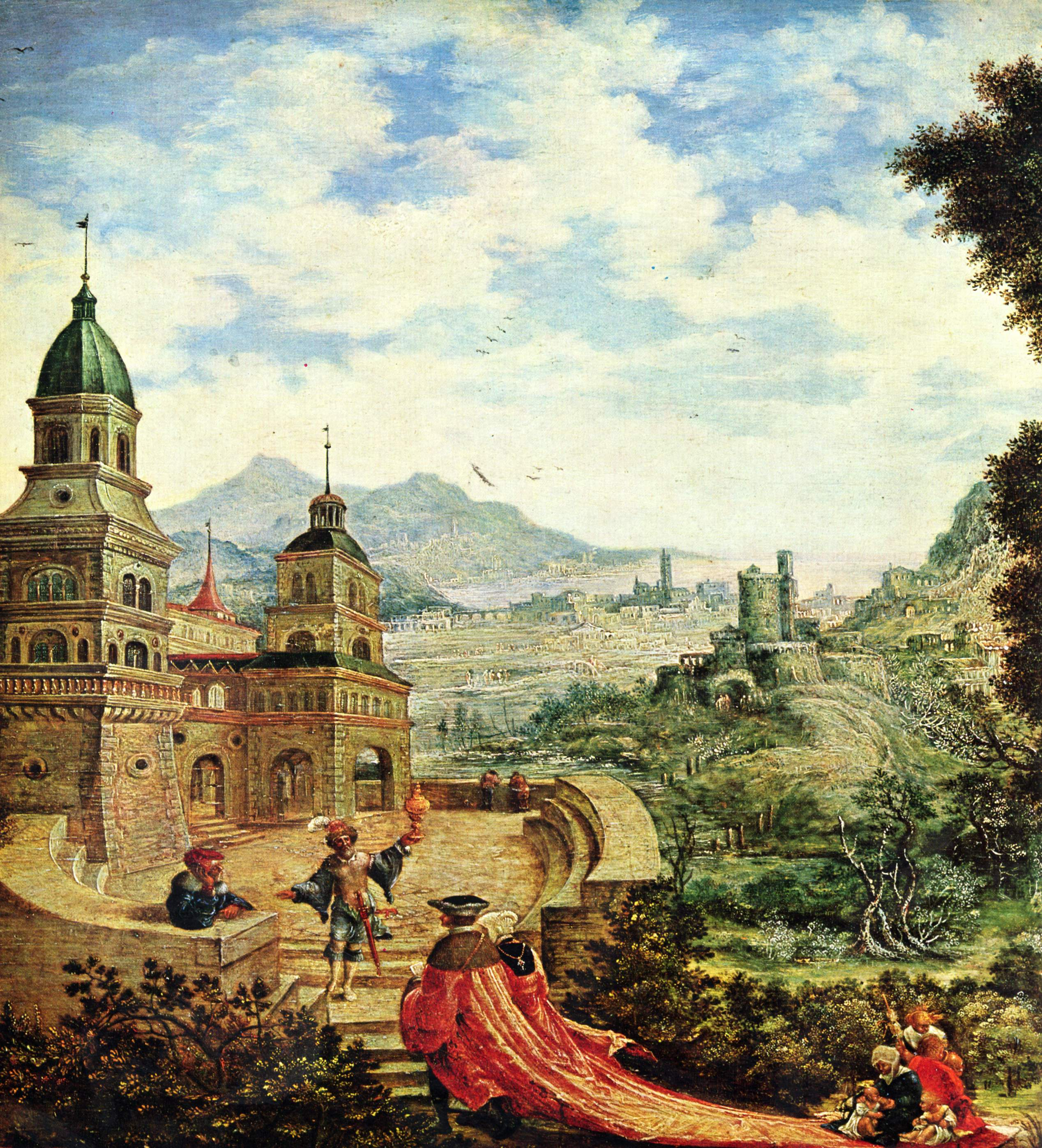
Altdorfer – The Pride of the Beggar Sitting on the Train, Gemäldegalerie, Berlin

- Albrecht Altdorfer – The Pride of the Beggar Sitting on the Train
- Correggio – Leda and the Swan
- Lucas Cranach the Elder – Cupid complaining to Venus (The honey thief) and The Three Graces (approximate date)
- Giulio Romano – Jonah and the Whale
- Giovanni Battista Piazzetta – Portrait of Sophie Juliane von der Schulenburg
- Lucas van Leyden – Healing the blind men of Jericho
- Bernard van Orley and William Dermoyen – The Battle of Pavia (tapestry, woven between 1528 and 1531)

== Births ==
- Vincenzo Cartari, Italian painter (died 1569)
- Luis de Carbajal, Spanish painter of the Renaissance period (died 1618)
- Lodovico Leoni, Italian painter mainly active in Rome (died 1606)
- (born 1531/1532): Alonso Sánchez Coello, portrait painter of the Spanish Renaissance (died 1588)

== Deaths ==
- Hans Burgkmair, German painter and printmaker in woodcut (born 1473)
- Andrea del Sarto, Italian painter from Florence (born 1486)
- Hans Leu the Younger, Swiss painter (born ca. 1490)
- Girolamo Mocetto, Italian Renaissance painter, engraver, and stained glass designer (born 1470)
- Tilman Riemenschneider, German sculptor and woodcarver (born 1460)
