= Borghese di Piero Borghese =

Italian painter

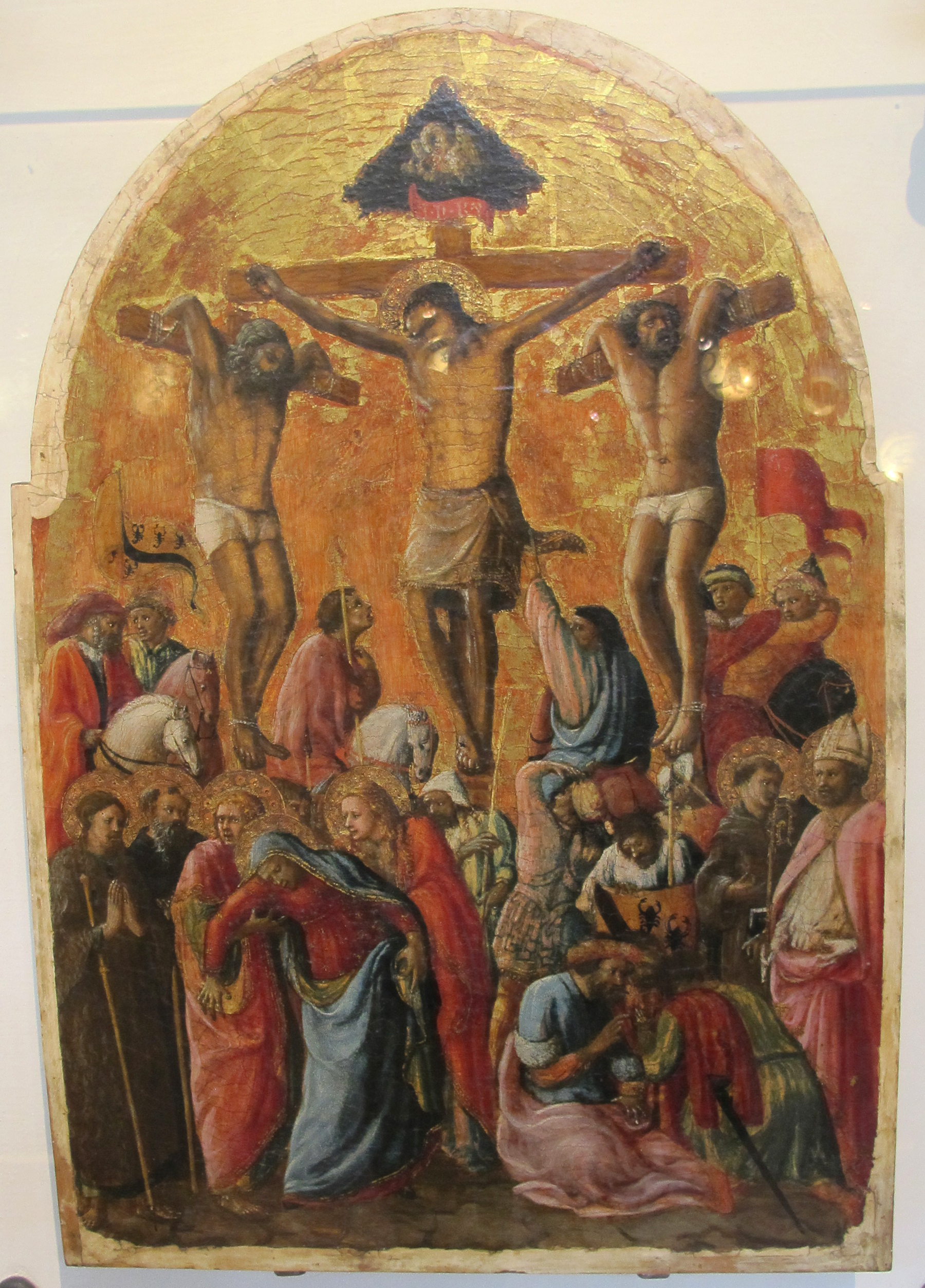
Crucifixion by Borghese di Piero Borghese, St. Lucia a Montecastello, circa 1430

Borghese di Piero Borghese, also Borghese di Piero, (1397 – c. 1463) was an Italian painter of the Florentine School, active in an early Renaissance-style. He should not be confused with Piero della Francesca whose real name was Pietro Borghese.

== Biography ==
Borghese was active in Pisa between 1420 and 1429, then in Lucca, where in 1447 he became a citizen of the city. Before attributions could be made to him, initially his works were ascribed to Master of Saints Cyrus and Juliet (Santi Quirico e Giulitta). He was identified as Piero di Borghese Borghese in 1965 by Roberto Longhi after reviewing three scenes of the predella relating Martyrdom of These Two Saints, part of 'The Story of Saints Julitta and Quiricus triptych in the Courtauld Gallery in London.
