= Lorenzo Allegri (painter) =

Italian painter

Lorenzo Allegri (died 1527) was an Italian painter, working in the city of Correggio in the Duchy of Modena.

== Life ==
Little is known of Lorenzo as an artist. He was, however, the uncle of Antonio Allegri da Correggio, and is often assumed to have given him his earliest artistic education. In 1503 he is recorded as painting a picture for the convent of San Francesco in Correggio. Some frescoes representing scenes from Ovid's Metamorphoses in the palace of Count Giberto in Correggio, painted in 1498 and signed "Laurentius P.", were also traditionally ascribed to him. They remained visible until the mid-18th century, but by the late 19th century, no works by him were known to survive.

Lorenzo was married twice, first to Catarina Calcagni, and then to Maria Prato, of San Martino. He had three daughters, and a son called Quirino, who also studied painting. Lorenzo's second wife, and probably his children, died before he did, as in March 1527 he made over his property to his brother Pellegrino, Antonio's father, retaining only the usufruct. He seems have been quite prosperous, as he had been able to buy a small estate in 1482.

Although lacking evidence from any surviving work, many writers have cast doubt on Lorenzo's abilities as an artist, mainly on the basis of a humorous remark in a pamphlet by Rinaldo Corso (which had been used before about other painters) that "wishing to depict a lion, [Lorenzo] drew a goat, and wrote the title above it."

== Sources ==
- Meyer, Julius (1876). Antonio Allegri da Correggio. London: Macmillan & Co.
- Ricci, Conrado (1896). Antonio Allegri da Correggio:His Life, his Friends, and his Time. London: William Heineman.

Attribution:
