= Marx Reichlich =

Austrian painter (1460–1520)

Marx Reichlich (1460–1520) was an Austrian painter.

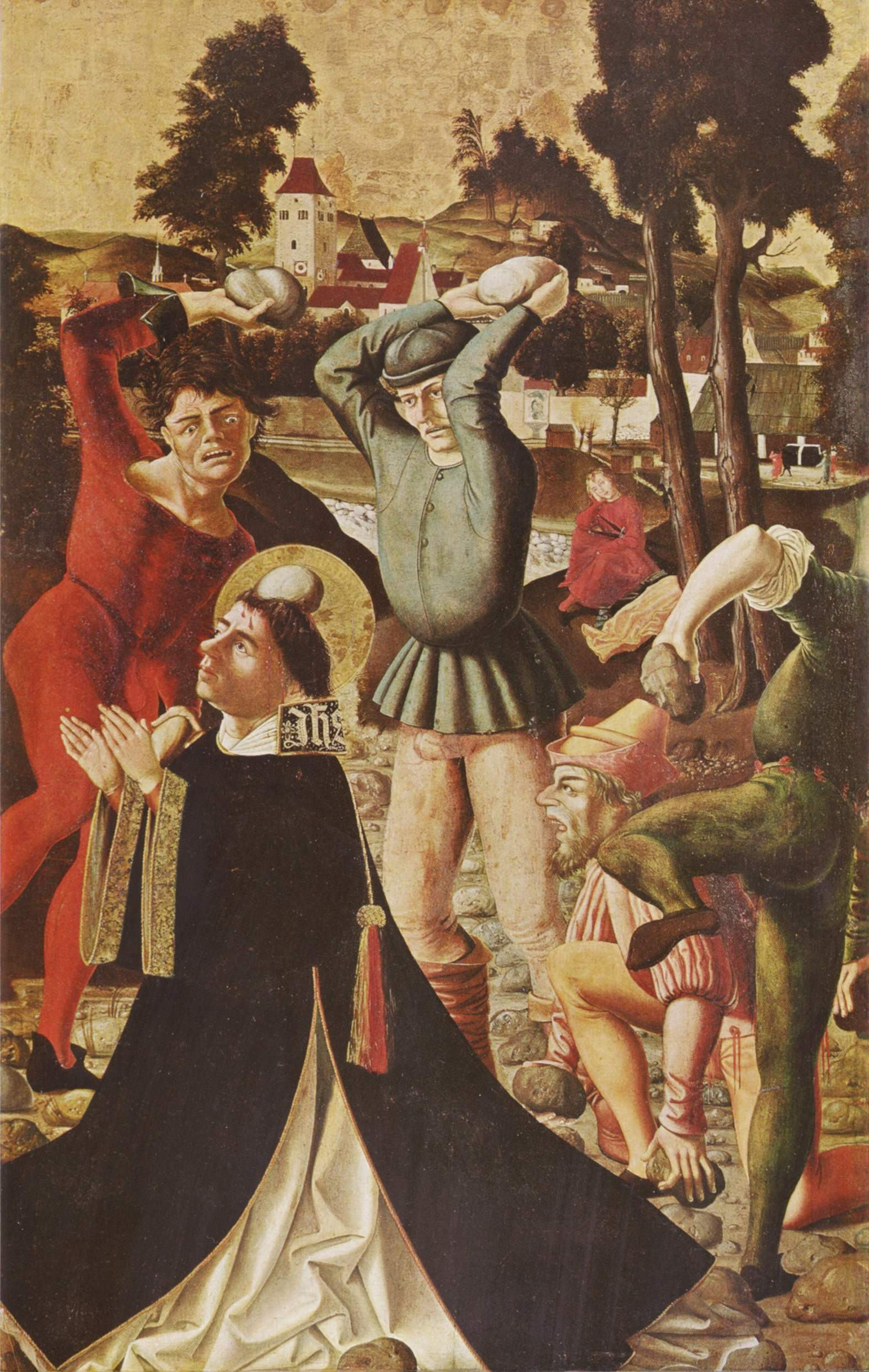
Marx Reichlich, The Stoning of St. Stephan, 1506

Reichlich was a painter of primarily religious works. He painted a number of traditional scenes as commissions for churches, including "Adoration of the Magi", and "The Last Judgement". Some of his works reside at the Kunsthistorisches Museum.
