= Man with a Glove =

1520 painting by Titian

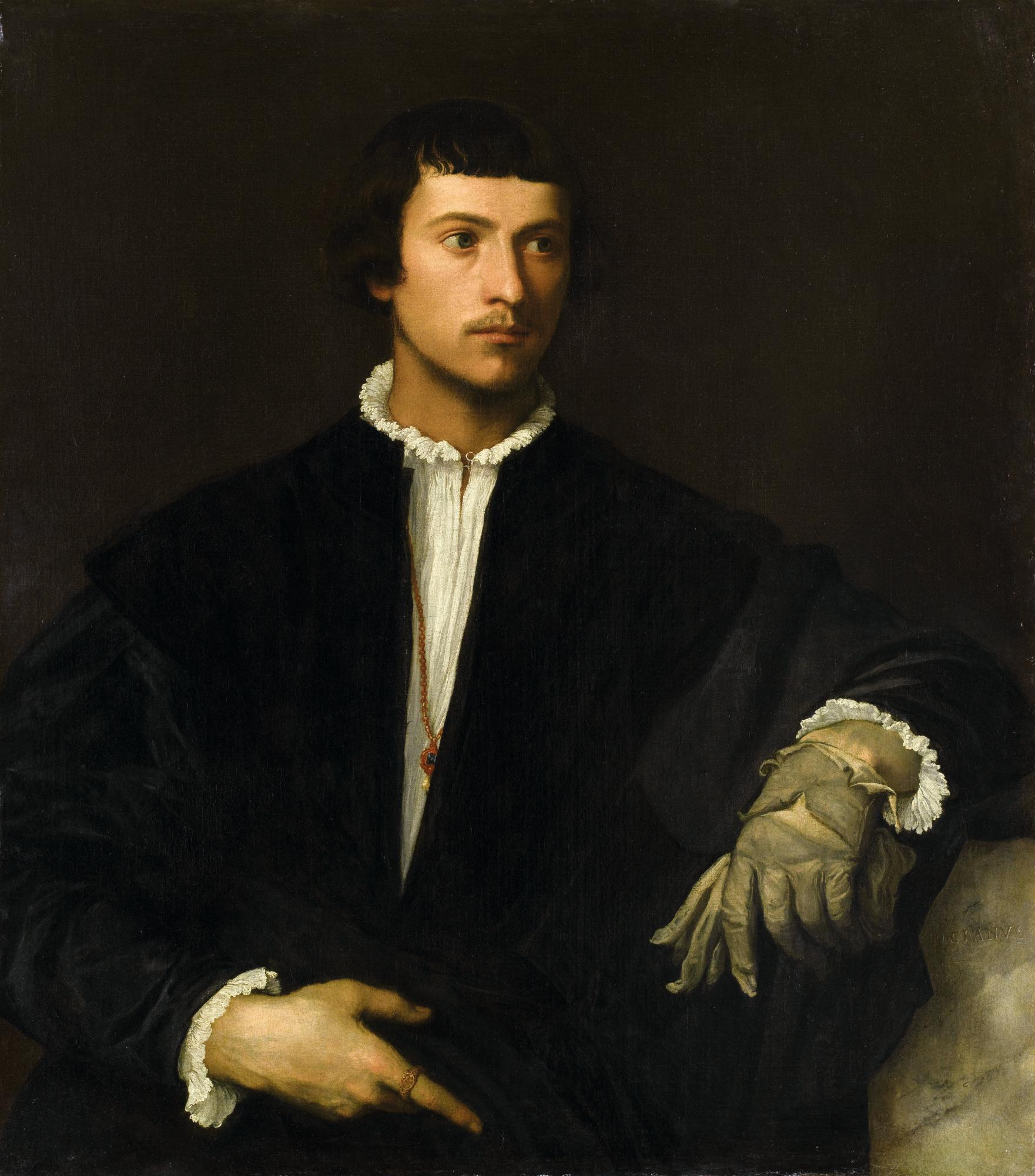
- Artist: Titian
- Year: c. 1520
- Medium: Oil on canvas
- Dimensions: 100 cm × 89 cm (39 in × 35 in)
- Location: Musée du Louvre, Paris

Man with a Glove (French: L'Homme au Gant) is an oil-on-canvas portrait by the Italian Renaissance artist Titian, painted c. 1520. It is part of the collections of the Musée du Louvre, Paris.

== History ==
The work originates from the Gonzaga family's collection at Mantua. It was acquired by Charles I of England in 1627. Sometime after his beheading in 1649, the painting was auctioned and bought by the Cologne banker Eberhard Jabach. Eventually, it came in the possession of Louis XIV of France, and was transferred from the Palace of Versailles to the Louvre in 1792.

The figure has not been identified with certainty. He could be Girolamo Adorno, mentioned in a 1527 letter from Pietro Aretino to Federico Gonzaga, or Giambattista Malatesta, an agent of the Gonzaga in Venice. According to another hypothesis, he could be Ferrante Gonzaga, who was sixteen years old in 1523.

== Description ==
The painting portrays a three-quarters view of a male figure set against a flat black background. He appears to be looking at an indefinite point to the left of the canvas, with his left arm laid on his knee. He could be pointing at his gloves, which were a fashion statement at the time. He is dressed in a wide jacket and a white shirt, in the fashion of the period.

The man's gloved left hand holds a second leather glove; an accessory used by the most refined gentlemen of the time. His right hand is adorned with a golden ring, a symbol of richness, and a necklace decorated with a sapphire and a pearl. The use of a parapet in portraits was a common device of the young Titian.

== In literature and popular culture ==
In Henry James's 1903 book The Ambassadors, Maria Gostrey is introduced by Strether to Little Bilham, in front of the "overwhelming portrait of the young man with the strangely-shaped glove and the blue-grey eyes" in the Louvre.

In John P. Marquand's 1936 book The Late George Apley, the fictional protagonist George Apley is painted by John Singer Sargent. The portrait is remarked to exhibit a character of a refined gentleman similar to the one in this Titian portrait.

In W. Somerset Maugham’s 1939 novel Christmas Holiday, the protagonist’s mother describes Man with a Glove as “one of the finest portraits that’s ever been painted” and proof of Titian’s “soul.”

In Siegfried Sassoon's 1942 memoir The Weald of Youth, a reproduction of the painting hangs above Sassoon's mantelpiece. The "calm scrutiny" of the "grave young man with a glove" is noted.

In Fred Saberhagen's Berserker series in the short story Patron of the Arts (first appeared in Worlds of If, Aug 1965), a human artist and a Berserker machine discuss the value of art and of this specific painting on a starship in the future after a space battle near the Sol system. In this short story, the Earth-Descended peoples place all of humanity's important artworks on an evacuation starship to preserve the works by sending them to Tau Epsilon.

In Albert Camus' 1971 novel A Happy Death, a character called Eliane, whom Patrice Meursault describes as an idealist, thinks that she looks like the figure from the painting and has various reproductions of the painting decorating her room.

In Mika Waltari’s novel The Wanderer, the painting is fictionally portrayed as depicting Finnish protagonist Mikael Karvajalka, shortly before he departs for his journey to Jerusalem.

== See also ==
- List of works by Titian
