= Giovanni Francesco da Rimini =

Italian painter

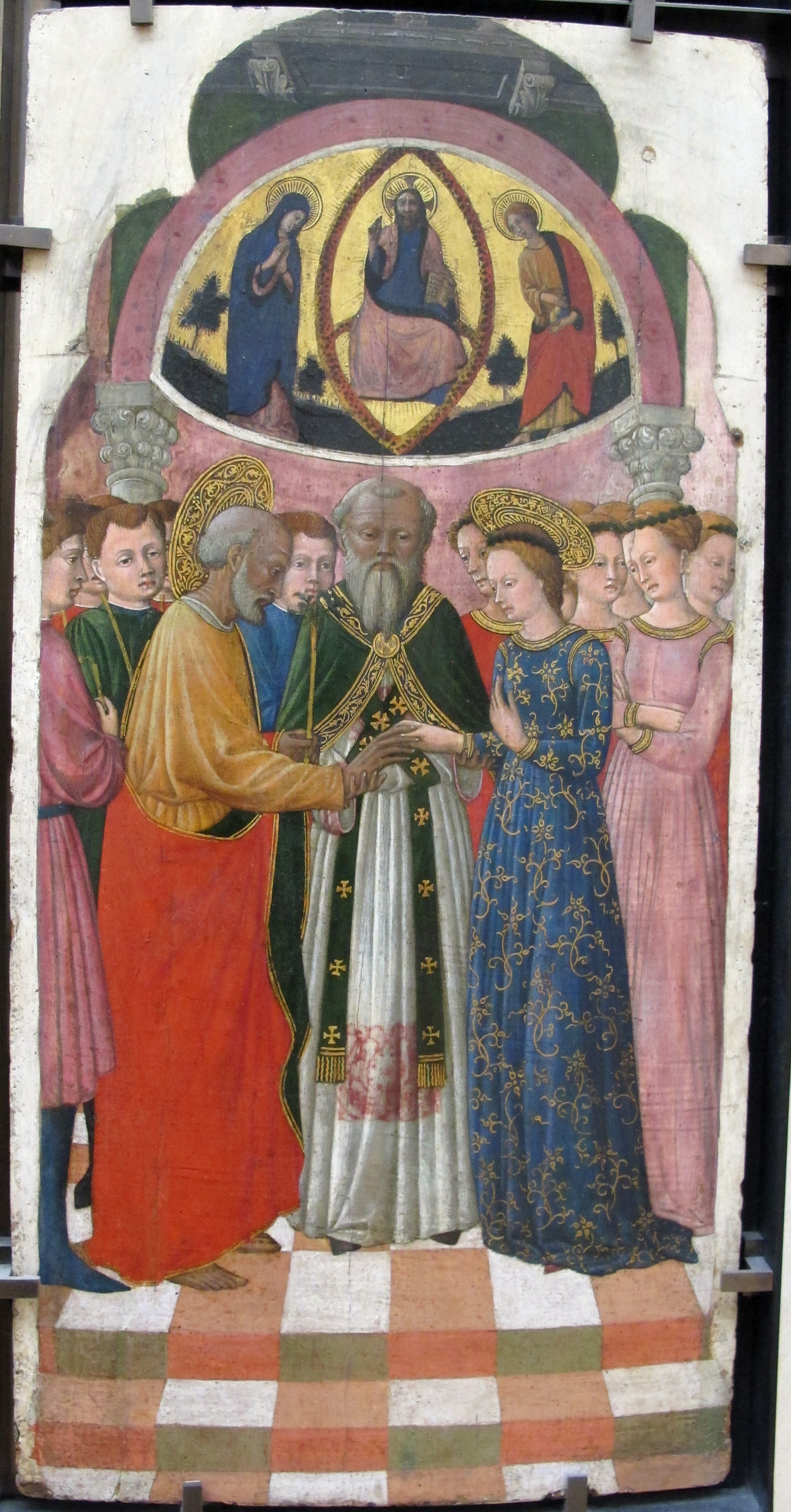
Panel scene by Giovanni Francesco da Rimini, egg tempera on wood, Louvre, 1440–50

Giovanni Francesco da Rimini (1420–1469), was an Italian painter. The artist was previously only known as the Master of the Scenes from the Life of the Virgin, until the works were properly attributed.

== Life ==
He was born in Rimini, and documents have place him in Padua between 1441 and 1444, and in Bologna several times 1459–1469. He painted primarily religious works for church commissions. His style and depictions of depth in some of his works suggest that he may have been influenced by the sculptures of Agostino di Duccio. Corrado Ricci saw the influence of Bonfigli in his style and attributed paintings in the apse of the Duomo of Atri to him. According to Ricci, he died in Bologna in 1471.
