= Agnolo di Domenico del Mazziere =

Italian painter

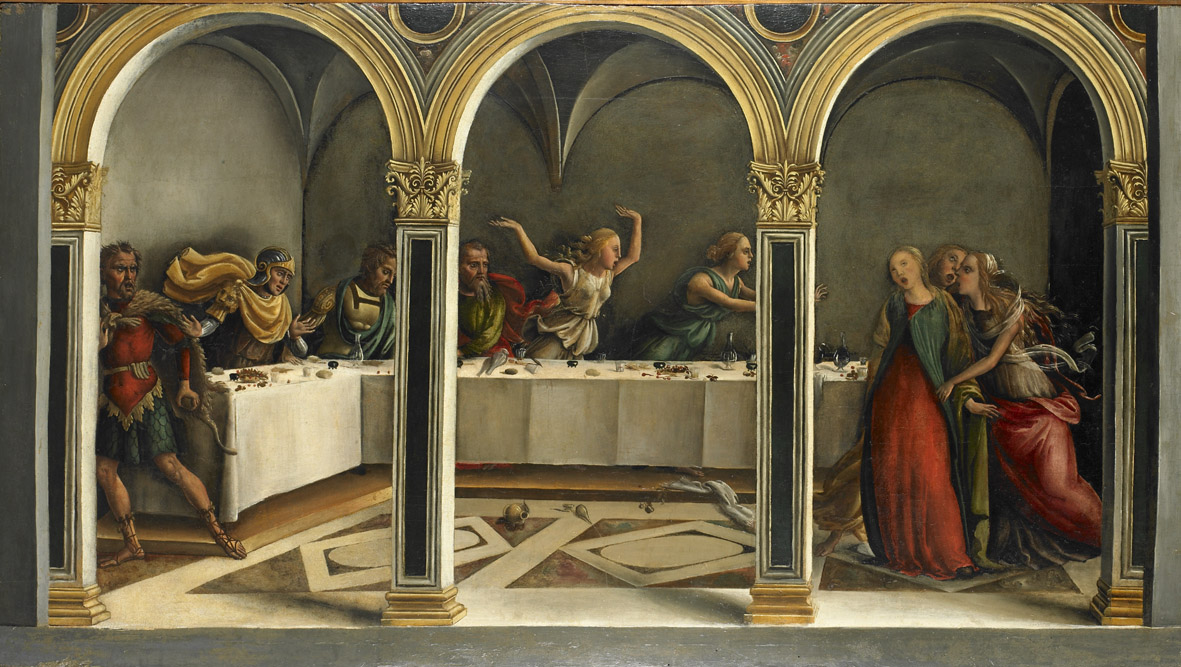
Lucretia announces her suicide, circa 1505-10. Paris, Galerie G. Sarti.

Agnolo di Domenico del Mazziere (1466–1513), formerly known as the Master of Santo Spirito and sometimes wrongly referred to as Agnolo di Donnino, was an Italian painter and draughtsman of the Early Renaissance.

In 1962 the art historian Federico Zeri assembled a group of stylistically similar paintings under the name of the Master of Santo Spirito, referring to the church in Florence where several of the paintings are found. Anna Padoa Rizzo later, in 1991, identified the artist as the brothers Agnolo and Donnino (1460-after 1515) di Domenico del Mazziere, who together operated a workshop in Florence from the early 1480s until the first two decades of the sixteenth century. The basis for this identification is the altarpiece of the Madonna and Child with Two Angels and Saints Lucy and Peter Martyr at the Gallerie dell'Accademia in Venice, which Padoa Rizzo discovered is in fact a documented work by Agnolo and Donnino, commissioned in 1490 for the hospital of Santa Lucia in Florence.

Since the two brothers shared a workshop they often collaborated, making it difficult to distinguish their individual styles. Tax documents suggest that Donnino, the elder brother, was the head of the workshop, while the writings of Giorgio Vasari and Filippo Baldinucci indicate that Agnolo was the most talented and better known of the two. Agnolo, along with several other artists including Francesco Granacci, was called to Rome in 1507 to assist Michelangelo with the Sistine Chapel ceiling. Michelangelo ultimately sent these artists back to Florence to finish the chapel himself.

Agnolo and Donnino painted altarpieces and fresco decorations for a number of churches in Florence and its surroundings. They also painted portraits, mythological panels and religious works for domestic interiors. Their paintings are frequently compared to those of Lorenzo di Credi. Works like the Portrait of a Girl at the Gemäldegalerie in Berlin or Madonna and Child with Two Angels at the Walters Art Museum, Baltimore, reflect the influence of contemporary Netherlandish painting. Agnolo was reportedly a pupil of Cosimo Rosselli. Donnino's son, Antonio (1497-1547), was also a painter.
