= Ulrich Apt the Elder =

German painter

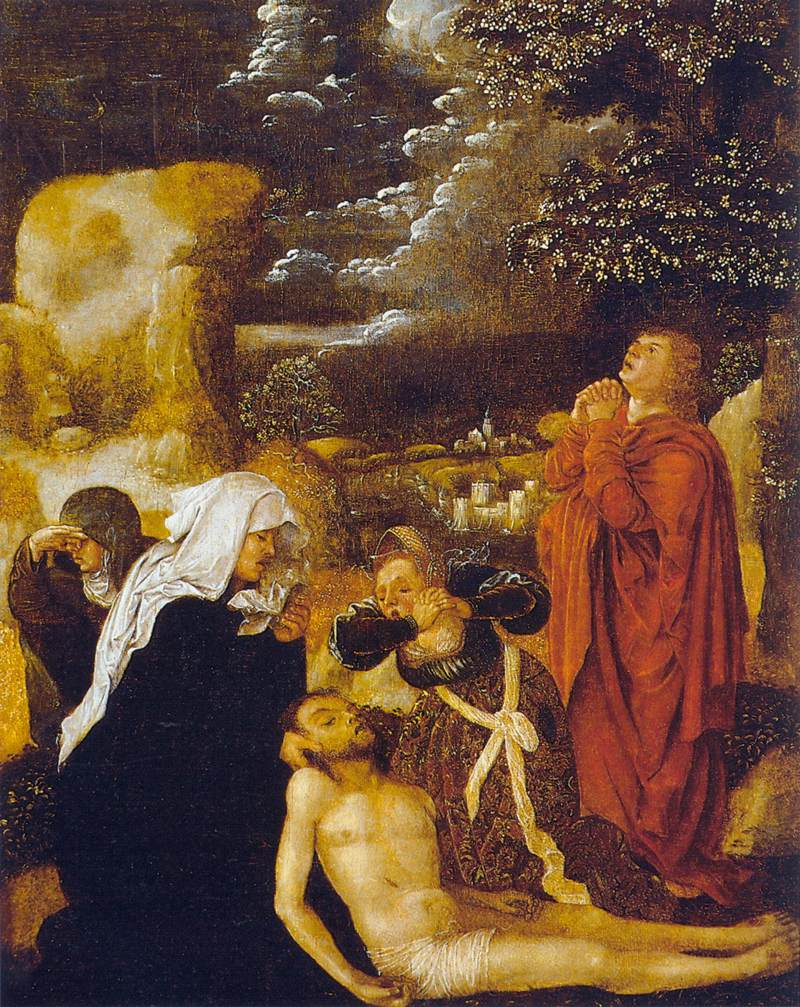
The Lamentation by Ulrich Apt the Elder, Thyssen-Bornemisza Museum, 1510

Ulrich Apt the Elder (1460–1532) was a German Late-Gothic painter.

== Biography ==
Apt was born in Augsburg, and lived and worked there all of his life. He became an independent master in 1481. He ran a workshop in Augsburg with his three sons Jacob, Ulrich Apt the Younger, and Michael, all artists, producing primarily religious themed works. He died in Augsburg in 1532.
