= Heinrich Bichler =

Swiss artist

- Born: Unknown
- Died: Before 31 January 1484
- Other name: Heinrich Büchler
- Known for: Painting
- Notable work: Battle of Morat scene for Fribourg's council chamber

Heinrich Bichler, also known as Heinrich Büchler, was a Bernese painter active in the late 15th century. He is documented for religious and heraldic commissions, and painted a now-lost Battle of Morat scene for Fribourg's council chamber in 1480. No signed works by him are known to survive.

== Biography ==
The earliest records of Bichler date from 1466/1467, when he is associated with painting work for St Nicholas Church in Fribourg. Surviving documents usually identify him as Heinrich der Maler. He joined the Bernese guild Zunft zum roten Löwen in 1475. In early 1484, the Bernese council appointed a guardian for his widow, Elsi. On 31 January 1484, he was recorded as deceased by the council.

== Works ==
Bichler worked as an altar, organ and heraldic painter. In 1468, he received the commission for the high altar of Bern Minster. In 1472, Bichler received payment from the Carthusians of Thorberg for a painting of Saint Sulpitius. In 1478, he made two panels bearing the imperial coat of arms for two Fribourg city gates, the Porte de Jaquemart and the Porte de Berne. In 1480, he painted a Battle of Morat scene for Fribourg's council chamber. The work no longer survives, but is known from later reproductions, including Martin Martini's engraving of 1609.

== Attribution ==
Bichler's workshop produced commissions not only in Bern, but also for Fribourg and Solothurn. No signed works by him are known to survive, and later scholarship has attempted to identify surviving paintings with Bichler himself or his workshop. The earlier identification of Bichler with the painter known as the Bernese Nelkenmeister is no longer accepted. Bichler has also been identified with the painter known as the Master of the Lamentation, associated with the convent of St Andreas in Sarnen, but the attribution of related altar panels remains unresolved.
