= Alessandro Pampurino =

Italian painter

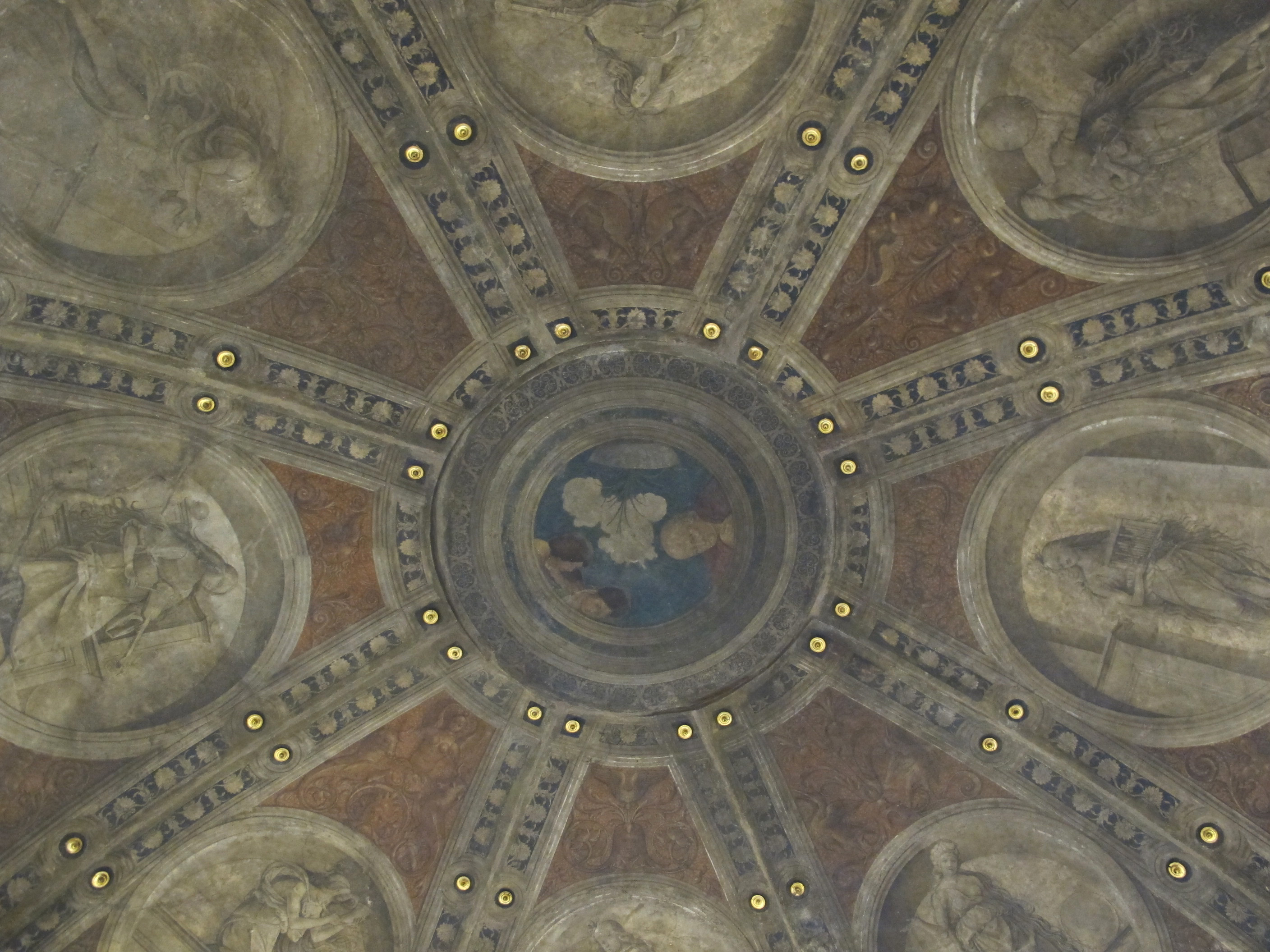
ceiling fresco by Alessandro Pampurino, Casa Maffi, Cremona, c. 1500

Alessandro Pampurino (1460–1523) was an Italian Renaissance painter.

Pampurino was born, lived and worked in Cremona all his life. Very little is known about his life except through his works and some documentation. He was primarily a fresco painter. He painted the ceiling grisaille on a vault in Casa Maffi, Cremona. It represented the Muses with Apollo. In the lunettes, arranged by pair, are represented profiles heads of the Roman emperors and their respective wives. In the center oculus, an old man, a woman and a boy are depicted looking down. This fresco is an example of Renaissance domestic decorative schemes based on Greek and Roman mythology, typical of the time.
