= Antonio de Saliba =

Italian painter

Antonio de Saliba, or Antonello de Saliba or Resaliba, (c.1466-c.1535) was an Italian painter of the Renaissance, mainly active in Sicily and Calabria.

Born around 1466, Antonello de Saliba was the son of Giovanni Resaliba, a woodcarver of possible Maltese descent who was married to Antonello da Messina's sister, whose name is not known. He was apprenticed to his cousin, Jacobello da Messina, for four years in 1480, with whom he probably traveled to Venice where Antonio stayed until the mid-1490s where he was for an unknown period affiliated probably as an assistant in the workshop of Giovanni Bellini together with his brother Pietro de Saliba. Following this Venetian sojourn, Antonio returned to Messina where he set up his workshop that produced altarpieces, gonfaloni, painted crucifixes, and other paintings for Eastern Sicilian, Calabrian, and Maltese patrons. Surviving paintings and transcribed and published documents reveal that Antonio de Saliba's workshop was active from 1497 until 1534.

His paintings can be found in and around the Veneto, Eastern Sicily, Malta, and Calabria, but also in important collections in major museums, such as the Metropolitan Museum of Art in New York, the Gallerie dell'Accademia in Venice, and the Victoria and Albert Museum in London.
