= Wang E =

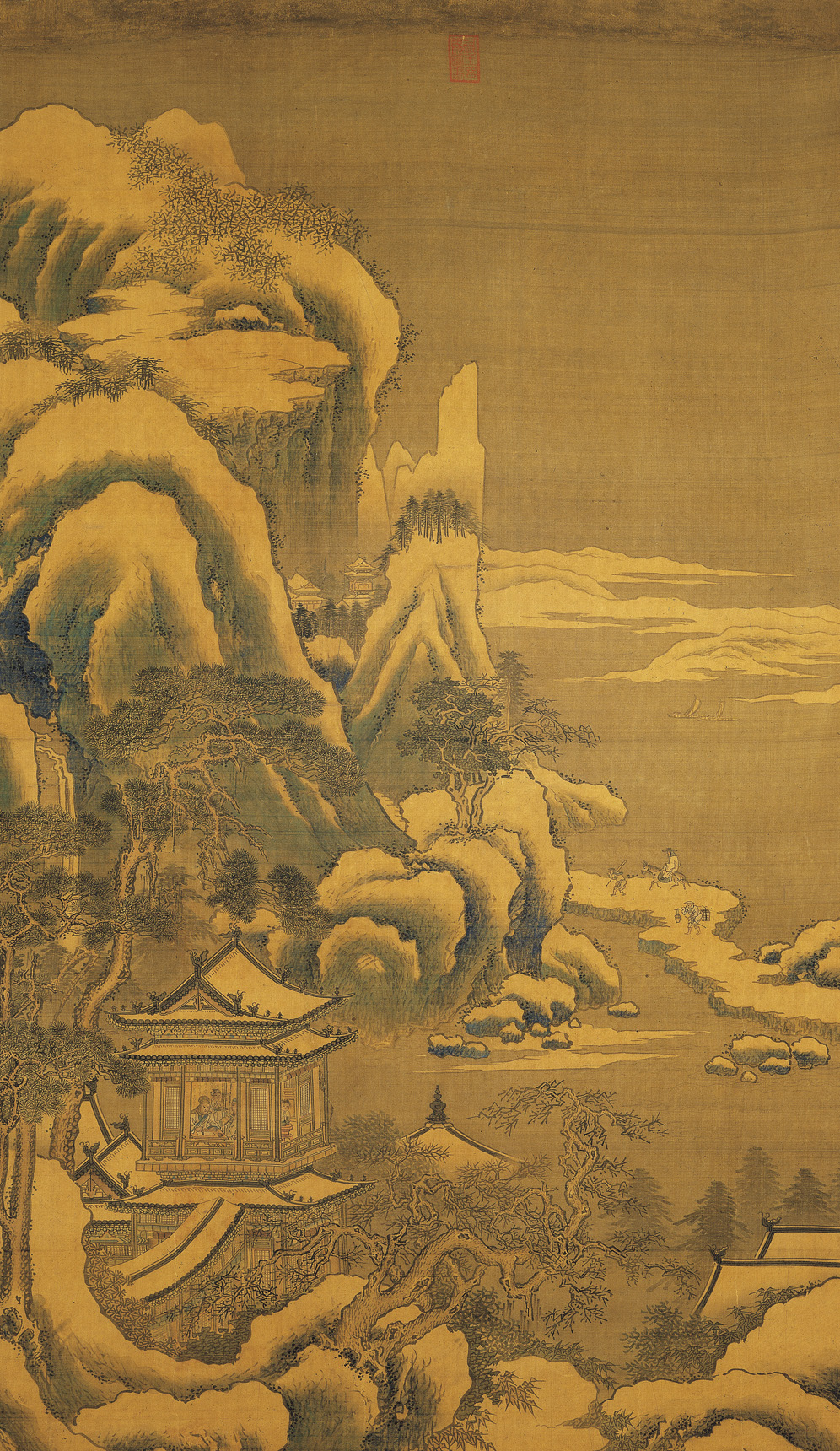
Auspicious Snow, National Palace Museum

Wang E (simplified Chinese: 王谔; traditional Chinese: 王諤; pinyin: Wáng È; Wade–Giles: Wang E; 1465? – 1545) was an imperial landscape painter during the Ming dynasty.

Wang E, style name 'Tingzhi' (廷直), was born in Fenghua, Zhejiang. He studied under Xiao Feng and later he served the Hongzhi Emperor. The emperor praised him as the Ma Yuan of his day (今之馬遠). Among the paintings of his that can be definitively dated, two were for Japanese envoys. He later retired to teaching and died at age 80.
