= Pellegrino Aretusi =

Italian painter

- Born: 1460
- Died: 20 November 1523 (aged 62–63)
- Known for: Painting
- Movement: High Renaissance

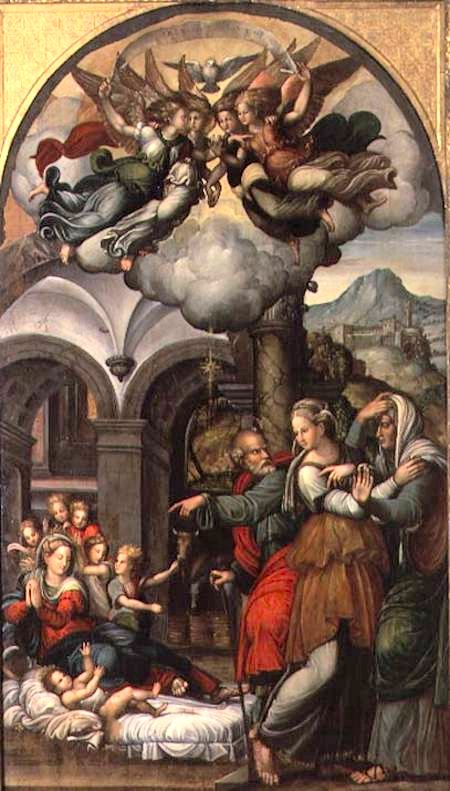
'Nativity with the Two Midwives', oil on canvas painting by Pellegrino Aretusi, Estense Gallery, Modena, Italy

Pellegrino Aretusi (ca. 1460–1523), also known as Pellegrini de Modena and Pellegrino Munari, was an Italian painter who was born in Modena, Italy. His early instruction was from his father Giovanni Munari. About 1509, Pellegrino went to Rome to assist Raphael at the Vatican. Pellegrino was then commissioned to paint frescos in the Church of St. Eustachio and the Church of St. Giacomo degli Spagnuoli, both in Rome. He was murdered on 20 November 1523 by relatives of a youth whom his son had killed.
