= Stories of Saint Stephen and Saint John the Baptist =

Fresco cycle by Filippo Lippi and his assistants

Coordinates: 43°52′54.6″N 11°5′53.92″E

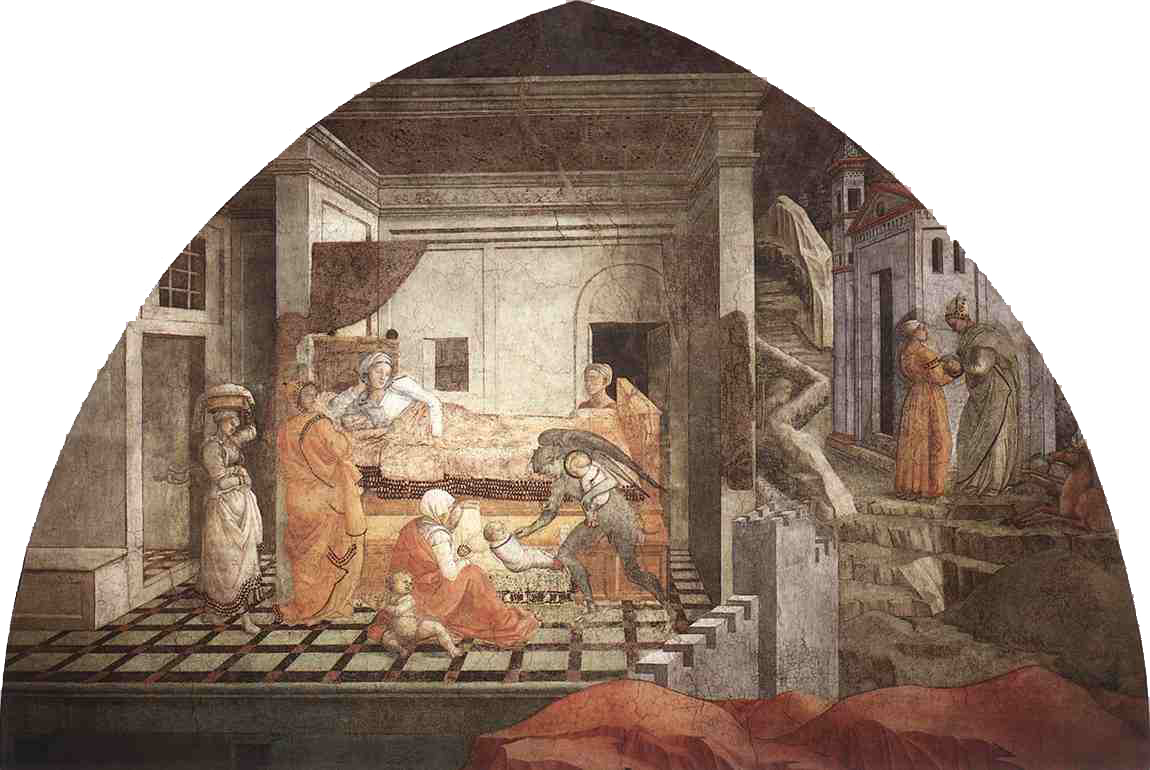
Lunette with the Birth of Saint Stephen.

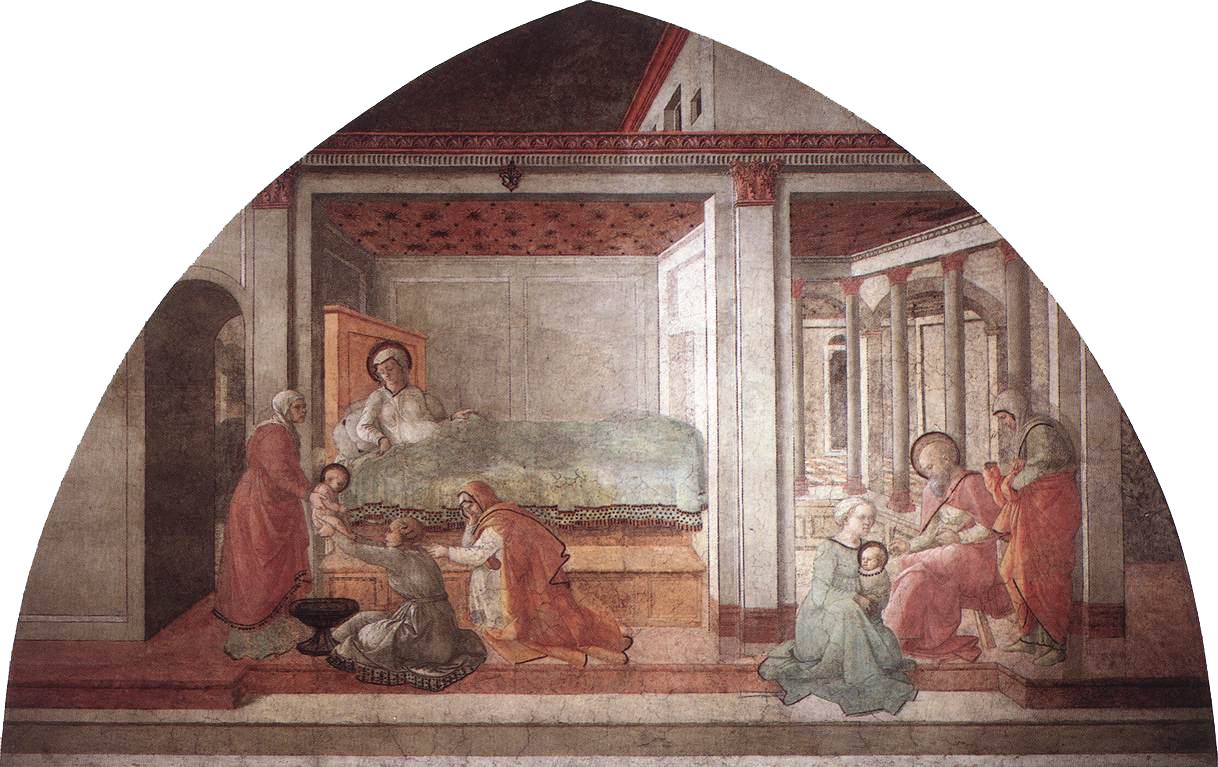
Birth of Saint John the Baptist.

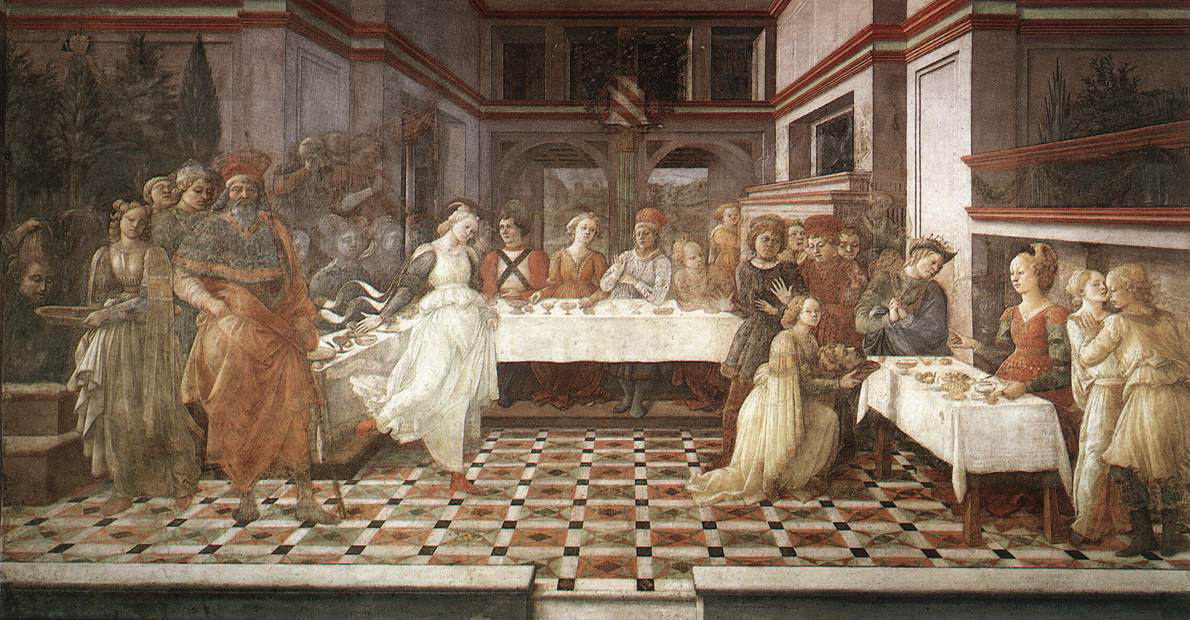
The Feast of Herod.

The Stories of Saint Stephen and Saint John the Baptist (Italian: Storie di santo Stefano e san Giovanni Battista) is a fresco cycle by the Italian Renaissance painter Filippo Lippi and his assistants, executed between 1452 and 1465. It is located in the Great Chapel (Cappella Maggiore) of the Cathedral of Prato, Italy.

== History ==
Geminiano Inghirami, the preposto of the Cathedral of Prato, then capitular church, was at the time an influential man in culture and politics, with important friendships in Rome and Florence. Himself a humanist, he often commissioned artworks to Renaissance artists, and sometimes called them to Prato, such as with Donatello and Michelozzo for the cathedral's external pulpit. The city decided to decorate the Great Chapel in the church in 1440, allocating a budget of 1200 gold florins for the work. Inghirami asked archbishop Antonino Pierozzi to call Fra Angelico. However, the aging friar, perhaps due to the extent of the work or because he was already committed to other works, declined the offer. Next was Fra Filippo Lippi, who accepted and established himself in Prato in 1452. Collaborators he brought with him included Fra Diamante, who had been his companion in novitiate.

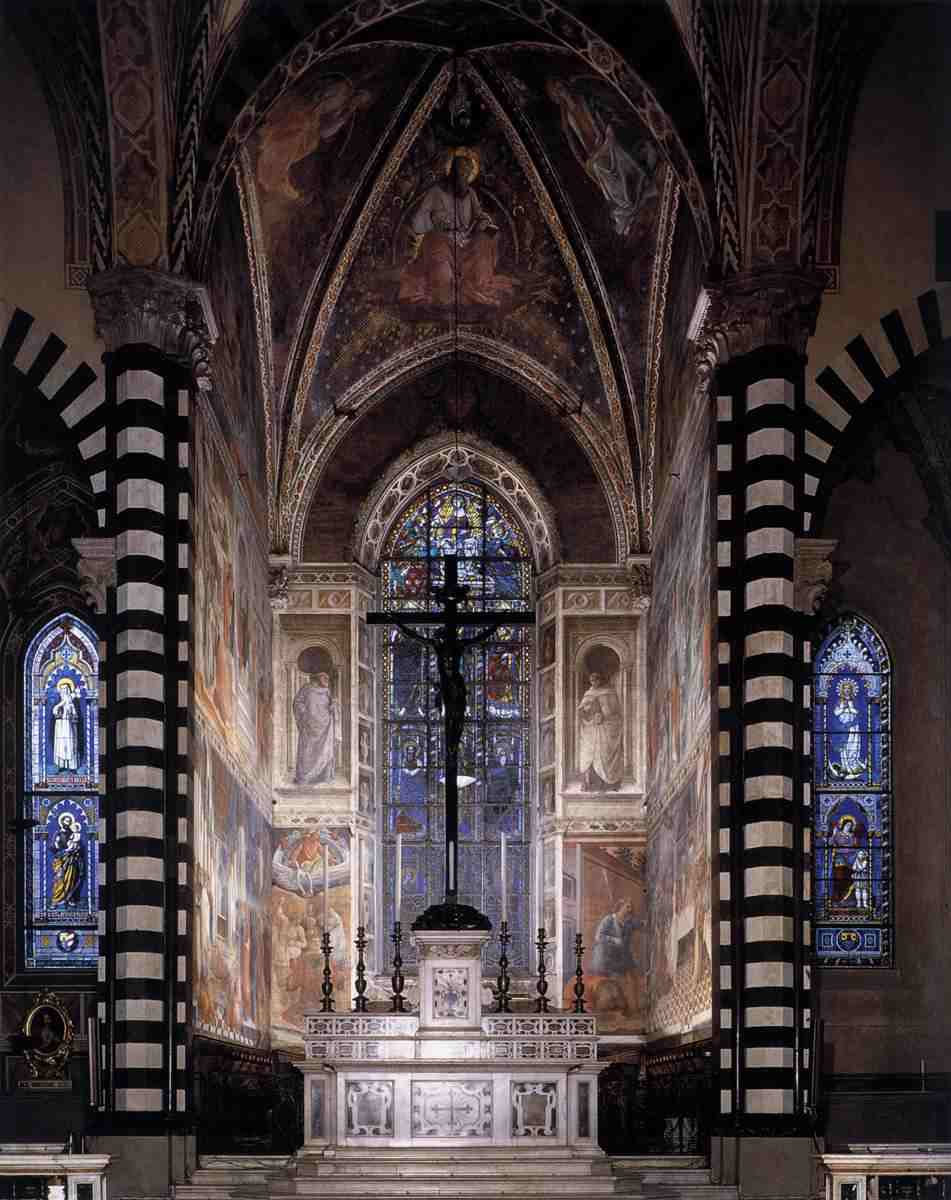
The Cappella Maggiore in the Prato Cathedral. Left: Life and martyrdom of Saint Stephen. Right: Life and beheading of Saint John the Baptist.

The completion of the work took fourteen years, with lates, pauses and scandals, such as that involving the painter (also a professed Carmelite friar and ordained priest) and a nun from the monastery of Santa Margherita, where Lippi had been chaplain from 1456 to the issue of a tamburazione (secret accusation) in May 1461. Her name was Lucrezia Buti: after acting as his model for some paintings, she gave birth to two children, Filippino Lippi in 1457 and Alexandra in 1465. The two lived together in a house near the city's Duomo. Once the scandal broke out, Lippi and Buti fled from the city. According to his biographer Giorgio Vasari, Pope Eugene IV released, only after the intercession of Cosimo de' Medici, Lippi from his vows and "had offered in his lifetime to give him a dispensation, that he might make Lucrezia (...) his legitimate wife, but [that] Fra Filippo desiring to retain the power of living after his own fashion, and of indulging his love of pleasure as might seem good to him, did not care to accept that offer." It was however Pope Pius II that granted them the dispensation allowing them to marry.

The frescoes were finished in 1465 under the supervision of the new preposto Carlo di Cosimo de' Medici. The following year Lippi moved to Spoleto, with his son Filippino and his apprentice Sandro Botticelli, where he died four years later.

In October 1993 the paintings were vandalized with a black pen by Pietro Cannata who had already performed vandalistic acts on other works of art among which the David of Michelangelo in 1991. They were restored starting from 2001, the chapel being reopened to the public in 2007.

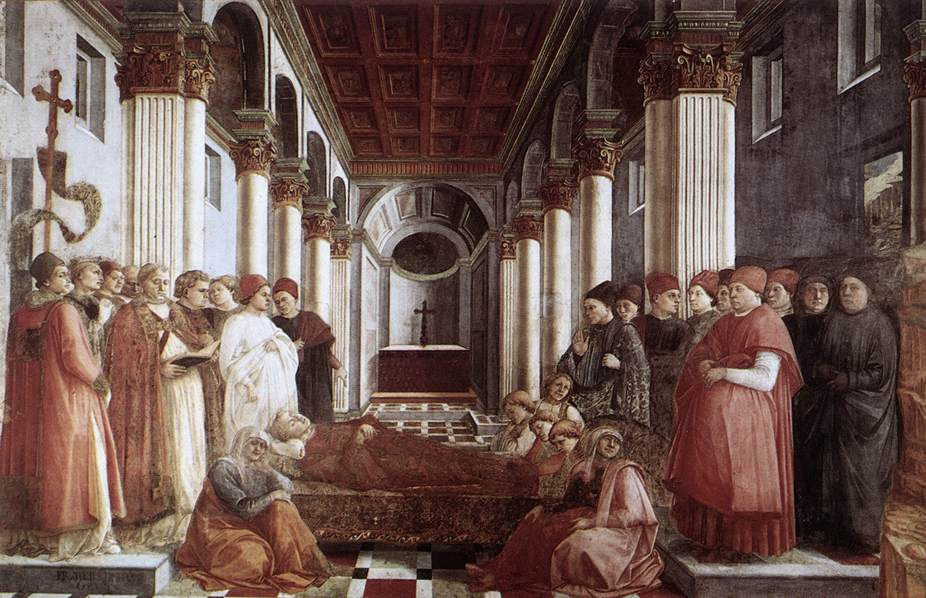
The Funeral of Saint Stephen.

== Description ==
The cycle occupies the two lateral walls and the end wall of the Cappella Maggiore, covering a surface of 400 m^{2} (4,300 sq ft) in total. At the left (looking from the nave towards the high altar) are the Stories of Saint Stephen, the titular saint of the church and patron saint of Prato; at the right are the Stories of Saint John the Baptist, the protector of nearby Florence. The end wall, at the side of the stained glass window (also designed by Lippi) are two saints in painted niches and, below, bent around the corners, are the martyrdoms of Saint Stephen (left) and Saint John the Baptist (right). At the top, in the pendentives of the cross-vaults, are the four Evangelists.

The two saints' stories are to be read from the top to the bottom, and mirror each other on the opposite walls. The two lunette depict scenes of the birth of the two saints, while in the central scenes is their abandon of the secular life to take the vows; finally, the lower scenes show their martyrdom (central wall) and their death or funeral (side walls).

The Stories of Saint Stephen include:

- Kidnapping of Newborn Saint Stephen. Set in a house seen through the sectioned front wall, the scene shows a winged demon exchanging the future saint, who had been born into a well-endowed family, with a small devil having the same appearance. At the right is the meeting between the young Saint Stephen and Bishop Julian, who, according to the legend, took care of him during his adolescence.
- Saint Stephen Leaving. It shows the saint leaving Julian for his mission in Cilicia.
- Stoning of Saint Stephen (central wall)
- Funeral of Saint Stephen. Set in a Palaeo-Christian basilica, it shows numerous characters taking part in Saint Stephen's funeral. They include a portrait of people from Lippi's time, such as a red-dressed Pope Pius II, Carlo di Cosimo de' Medici behind him, and, next to them, the artist's self-portrait.

The Stories of Saint John the Baptist include:

- Birth of Saint John the Baptist
- Saint John the Baptist Leaving his family, Prayer and Predication in the Desert
- Beheading of Saint John the Baptist
- Feast of Herod, including the dance of Salome (perhaps a portrait of Lucrezia Buti) and the presentation of the saint's head to a cold Herodias

Lippi's frescoes were largely completed a secco (i.e. after the plaster used for fresco painting had dried), and therefore numerous details are now mere halos (for example, in the Feast of Herod the vases on the right and the table companions at the left).

== Sources ==
- Borsook, Eve (1975). Fra Filippo Lippi and the Murals for Prato Cathedral. Mitteilungen des Kunsthistorischen Institutes in Florenz. Vol. 19. pp. 1–148. OCLC 19541926.
- Vasari, Giorgio (1896) [1550]. "Fra Filippo Lippi, Florentine painter". In Foster, Jonathan; Blashfield, Edwin H.; Blashfield, Evangeline W.; et al. (eds.). Lives of seventy of the most eminent painters, sculptors and architects. Vol. 2. C. Scribner's son. pp. 68–78.
- Anderson, Arthur James (1908). The romance of Fra Filippo Lippi : a new version of the love story of the friar-artist and the nun Lucrezia. Toronto: Copp, Clark.
- Drees, Clayton J. (2001). "Lippi, Fra Filippo". The late medieval age of crisis and renewal : 1300 - 1500 : a biographical dictionary. Westport, Conn.: Greenwood. pp. 287–288. ISBN 9780313305887.
- Santi, Bruno (2001). "Botticelli". I protagonisti dell'arte italiana (in Italian). Firenze: Scala Group. ISBN 88-8117-091-4.
