= Cristofano Robetta =

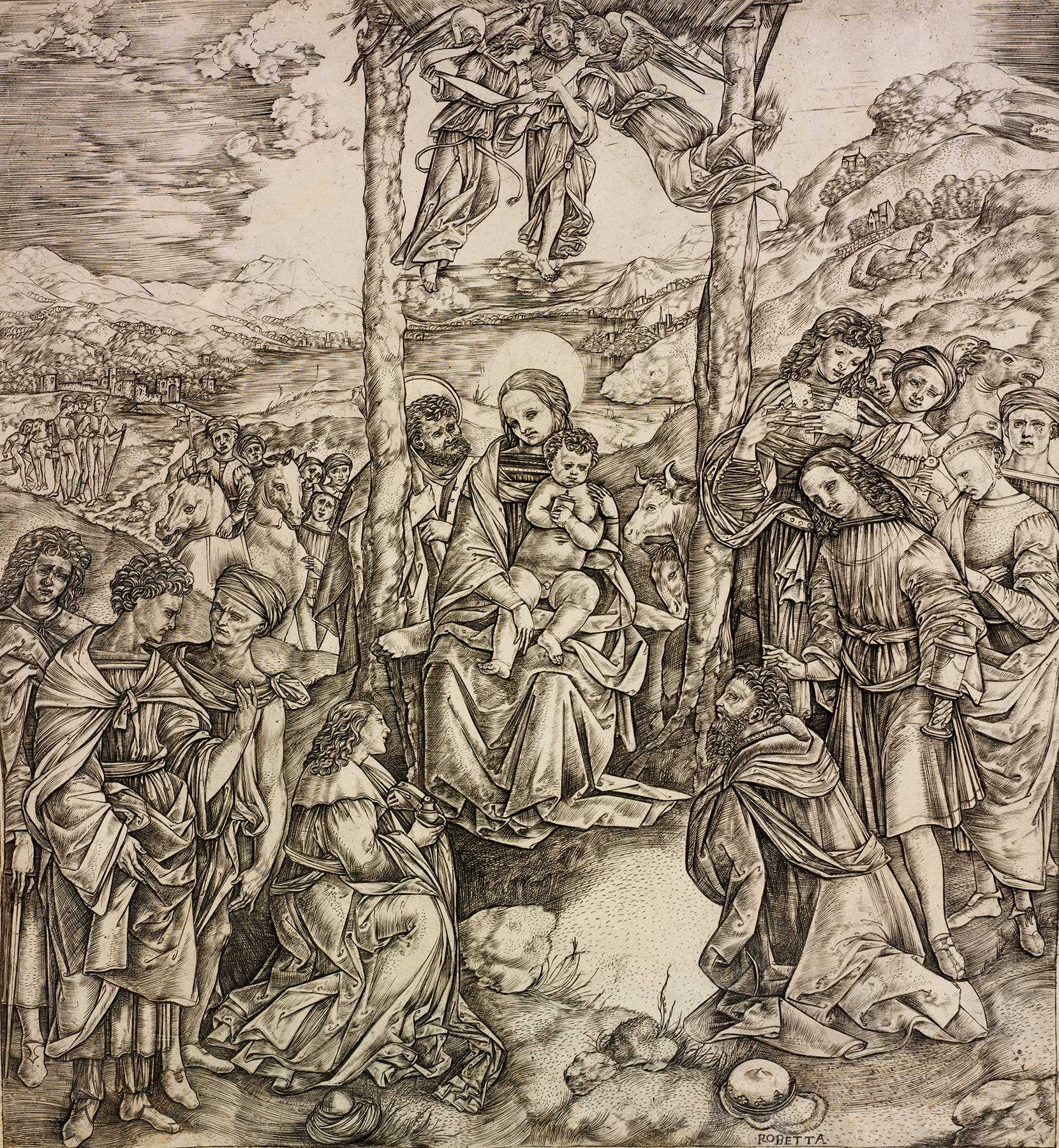
Adoration of the Magi by Cristofano Robetta, Rhode Island School of Design Museum, 1500

Cristofano Robetta (1462 – 1535) was an Italian artist, goldsmith, and engraver.

Robetta was a Florentine "who made some rich, intricate engravings in the fine manner". He often made engravings which replicated paintings others had done, some of which preserved works that had otherwise been destroyed.

Some of his works reside at the Cleveland Museum of Art and the Metropolitan Museum of Art.
