= 1490s in art =

- 1480s
- 1490s in art
Other topics in 1490s:
- Music

Art timeline

The decade of the 1490s in art involved some significant events.

== Events ==
The Renaissance is in full swing during the 1490s, and Leonardo da Vinci is painting in realistic, chiaroscuro style. In music, many new musical styles are being created, including the motet and madrigal, replacing an emphasis on chanting (and simple melodies) with polyphony and homophony. Christopher Columbus's explorations of the New World captivates the artistic imagination of both artists and the public.

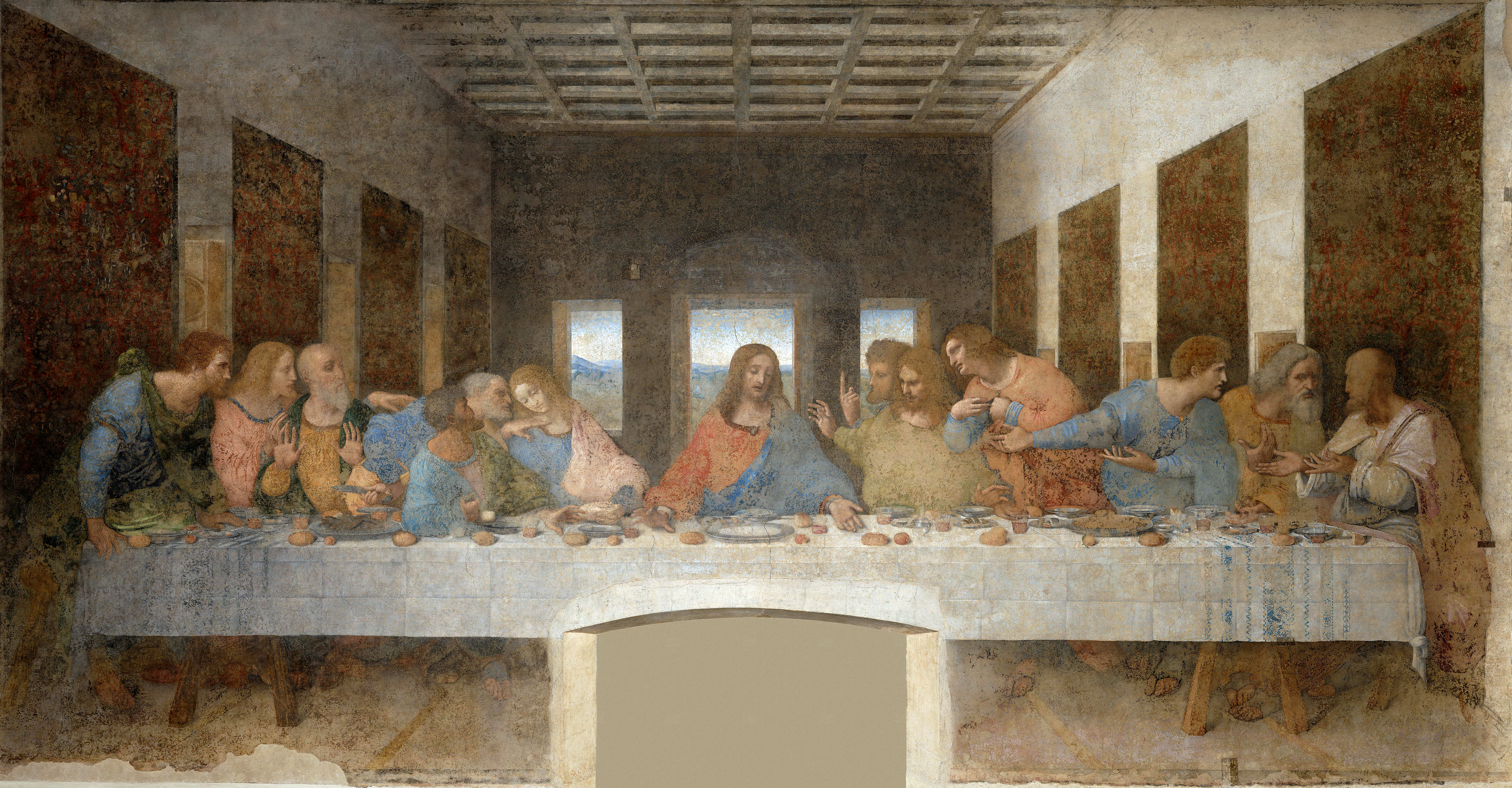
Leonardo da Vinci, The Last Supper, 1498, Santa Maria delle Grazie (Milan)

- 1490 – July 13: John of Kastav finishes a cycle of frescoes in the Holy Trinity Church, Hrastovlje (Slovenia).
- 1495: Donatello's bronze Judith and Holofernes is moved from the Palazzo Medici Riccardi to the Piazza della Signoria, beside the main door of the Palazzo Vecchio in Florence.
- 1496: Juan de Flandes joins the court of Isabella I of Castile.

== Sculptures ==
- 1491: ** Michelangelo Madonna of the stairs
- 1492:** Michelangelo Battle of the Centaurs
- 1494 –
  - January – Following heavy snowfall in Florence, the Italian sculptor Michelangelo was commissioned by the Medicis to build a snowman.
  - Tilman Riemenschneider carves the Seated Bishop
- 1496: The bronze equestrian statue of Bartolomeo Colleoni designed by Andrea del Verrocchio and completed by Alessandro Leopardi is unveiled in Venice
- 1497 Michelangelo Bacchus marble
- 1498–1499: Michelangelo carves his Pietà for St. Peter's Basilica, Rome, in Carrara marble

== Paintings ==
- c. 1486–1490: Domenico Ghirlandaio paints the fresco Birth of St. Mary in the Tornabuoni Chapel of the Basilica of Santa Maria Novella in Florence
- 1490s: Giovanni Antonio Boltraffio and Marco d'Oggiono paint a Resurrection (Gemäldegalerie, Berlin)
- 1490:
  - Leonardo da Vinci completes painting the portrait Lady with an Ermine and (probably) paints Portrait of a Musician
  - Cima da Conegliano paints his Sacred Conversation now in Milan
- c. 1490
  - Giovanni Bellini paints two Sacred Conversations and a presumed portrait of Bartolomeo d'Alviano
  - Albrecht Dürer paints a Portrait Diptych of Dürer's Parents
  - Cosmè Tura completes painting St Anthony of Padua
- c. 1490–1497: Leonardo da Vinci or one of his school paints La belle ferronnière
- c. 1490–1498, probably c. 1495: Gerard David paints Triptych of the Sedano family
- c. 1490–1500: Giovanni Bellini paints the Holy Allegory and Portrait of a Gentleman (both Uffizi, Florence)
- c. 1490–1504: Giovanni Bellini paints four Allegories

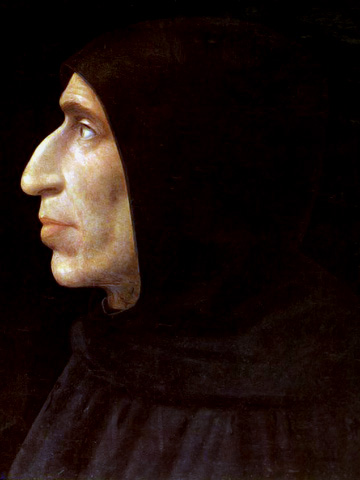
Fra Bartolomeo, Portrait of Girolamo Savonarola, the artist's mentor, c. 1498

- 1492: Andrea Mantegna paints Descent Into Limbo a depiction of Christ descending into limbo to liberate the souls of the righteous
- 1493
  - Albrecht Dürer paints Portrait of the Artist Holding a Thistle, a self-portrait at the age of 22
  - Giovanni Ambrogio de Predis probably paints at least one portrait of Bianca Maria Sforza
- c. 1493–1495: A version of Bernt Notke's Danse Macabre is installed in St. Nicholas Church, Tallinn
- c. 1494: Kamāl ud-Dīn Behzād paints The Caliph Harun al-Rashid Visits the Turkish Bath, from a copy of the 12th century Khamsa (Five Poems) of Nizami Ganjavi, Herat, Afghanistan (British Library, London)
- 1495
  - Cima da Conegliano paints Madonna and Child
  - Giovanni Donato da Montorfano paints The Crucifixion
  - Sandro Botticelli paints Calumny of Apelles
  - Sesshū Tōyō produces Haboku sansui (Broken Ink Landscape)
- c. 1495
  - Pedro Berruguete paints Saint Dominic Presiding over an Auto-da-fe
  - Jan Provoost paints a Crucifixion (Metropolitan Museum of Art, New York)
- c. 1495–1496: Leonardo da Vinci probably draws the Portrait of a Young Fiancée for the Sforziada
- c. 1495–1500: Hieronymus Bosch paints Christ Crowned with Thorns (National Gallery, London)
- c. 1495 and beyond: followers of Martin Schongauer paint the colossal Buhl Altarpiece
- 1496
  - An anonymous portrait of Jacob Obrecht is painted
  - Cima da Conegliano paints Madonna and Child
- c. 1496
  - Gentile Bellini paints Procession in St. Mark's Square as one of the commissions for the grand hall of the Scuola Grande di San Giovanni Evangelista in Venice.
  - Vittore Carpaccio paints Miracle of the Relic of the Cross at the Ponte di Rialto as one of the commissions for the grand hall of the Scuola Grande di San Giovanni Evangelista in Venice.
  - Juan de Flandes paints Portrait of an Infanta (possibly Catherine of Aragon) and Herodia's Revenge
- c. 1496–1497: Sandro Botticelli paints Michael Tarchaniota Marullus
- 1496–1498: Cima da Conegliano paints Madonna and Child, Rest on the Flight into Egypt, Madonna of the Orange Tree and Madonna and Child Enthroned with Saints
- 1497
  - Albrecht Dürer paints Portrait of Dürer's Father at 70
  - Andrea Mantegna paints Parnassus and the Trivulzio Madonna
  - Pietro Perugino paints the Fano Altarpiece and The Baptism of Christ (Musée des Beaux-Arts de Rouen)
- c. 1497–1498
  - Fra Bartolomeo paints Portrait of Girolamo Savonarola
  - Vittore Carpaccio paints the Legend of Saint Ursula series for the Scuola di Sant'Orsola in Venice
- 1498
  - Gerard David paints the diptych The Judgement of Cambyses
  - Albrecht Dürer paints a Self-Portrait at the age of 26 and (about this date) the Haller Madonna
  - Leonardo da Vinci completes painting The Last Supper (Santa Maria delle Grazie (Milan))
- c. 1498: Creation of Hours of Louis XII begins
- 1499: Giovanni di Niccolò Mansueti paints The Arrest of Saint Mark in the Synagogue
- c. 1499: Piero di Cosimo paints The Discovery of Honey by Bacchus

== Engravings ==
- 1494: Albrecht Dürer - illustrations to Ship of Fools
- c. 1495: Albrecht Dürer - The Holy Family with the Dragonfly
- 1497: Albrecht Dürer - The Four Witches
- c. 1498: Albrecht Dürer
  - Apocalypse
  - Saint Michael Fighting the Dragon
  - The Temptation of the Idler or The Dream of the Doctor
- c. 1498–1500: Albrecht Dürer - The Sea Monster

== Births ==
- 1490: Giovanni Cariani - Italian painter of the high-Renaissance (died 1547)
- 1490: Peter Dell the Elder – German sculptor (died 1552)
- 1490: Agostino Veneziano – Italian engraver (died 1540)
- 1490: Giovanni Maria Francesco Rondani – Italian painter of the Parmesan school of painting (died 1550)
- 1490: Gregório Lopes – Renaissance painter from Portugal (died 1550)
- 1490: Hans Dürer – German Renaissance painter, illustrator, and engraver
- 1490: Peter Flötner - German designer, sculptor, and printmaker (died 1546)
- 1490: Lucas Gassel, Flemish painter (died 1568)
- 1490: Adriaen Isenbrandt – Flemish painter (died 1538)
- 1490: Battista Dossi – Italian painter who belonged to the Ferrara School of Painting (died 1548)
- 1490: Dosso Dossi – Italian Renaissance painter who belonged to the Ferrara School of Painting (died 1542)
- 1490: Vincenzo Pagani - Italian painter (died 1568)
- 1490: Valentin Bousch - French master glass artist and a glass painter (died 1541)
- 1490: Fra Paolo da Pistoia – Italian painter and Dominican friar (died 1547)
- 1490: Diego Siloe – Spanish Renaissance architect and sculptor (died 1563)
- 1490: Hans Springinklee - German wood-engraver (died 1540)
- 1490: Marinus van Reymerswaele – Dutch Renaissance painter (died 1546)
- 1490: Stanisław Samostrzelnik – Polish Renaissance painter and Cistercian monk (died 1541)
- 1490/1491: Altobello Melone – Italian painter of the Renaissance (died 1543)
- 1490/1495: Lucas Horenbout – Flemish artist and court miniaturist (died 1544)
- 1491: Francesco Melzi – Italian painter and pupil of Leonardo da Vinci (died 1570)
- 1492: Simone Mosca - Italian sculptor (died 1554)
- 1492: Domenico Puligo - painter from Florence (died 1527)
- 1492: Michelangelo Anselmi – Italian Renaissance-Mannerism painter active mostly in Parma (died 1554)
- 1492/1495: Polidoro da Caravaggio – Italian early Renaissance painter (died 1543)
- 1493: Bartolommeo Bandinelli - Florentine sculptor (died 1560)
- 1493: Barthel Bruyn the Elder - German painter (died 1555)
- 1493: Marco Dente – Italian engraver of the Renaissance (died unknown)
- 1494: Francesco Bacchiacca - Florentine Mannerist painter (died 1557)
- 1494: Giovanni Bernardi - Italian gem engraver and medalist (died 1553)
- 1494: Santi Buglioni - Italian sculptor (died 1576)
- 1494: Qiu Ying – Chinese painter who specialized in the gongbi brush technique (died 1552)
- 1494: Lucas van Leyden – Dutch engraver and painter (died 1533)
- 1494: Rosso Fiorentino – Italian Mannerist painter, in oil and fresco (died 1540)
- 1494: Ambrosius Holbein – German and Swiss artist in painting, drawing and printmaking (died 1519)
- 1494: Innocenzo di Pietro Francucci da Imola – Italian painter and draftsman (died 1550)
- 1494: Pontormo – Italian Mannerist painter and portraitist from the Florentine school (died 1557)
- 1495: Antonio Labacco - Italian architect, engraver, and writer (died 1567)
- 1495: Jan van Scorel – Dutch painter credited with the introduction of High Italian Renaissance art to the Netherlands (died 1562)
- 1495: Francesco Signorelli - Italian Renaissance painter (died 1553)
- 1495: Paris Bordone - Venetian painter (died 1570)
- 1495: Scipione Sacco – Italian painter of the Renaissance active in Cesena (died 1558)
- 1495: Hans Weiditz - German Renaissance woodcut artist (died 1536)
- 1496: Dirck Jacobsz – Dutch Renaissance painter (died 1567)
- 1496: Lu Zhi – Chinese landscape painter, calligrapher, and poet during the Ming Dynasty (died 1576)
- 1497: Hans Holbein the Younger – German artist and printmaker who worked in a Northern Renaissance style (died 1543)
- 1498: Giulio Bonasone - Italian painter and engraver (died 1574)
- 1498: Giulio Clovio – Renaissance illuminator, miniaturist, and painter, born in Croatia, who worked in Renaissance Italy (died 1578)
- 1498: Diego de Arroyo - Spanish miniature painter (died 1551)
- 1498: Moretto da Brescia – Italian Renaissance painter of Brescia and Venice (died 1554)
- 1498: Lancelot Blondeel - Bruges-based Flemish painter (died 1561)
- 1498: Anthony Toto - Italian painter and architect (died 1554)
- 1498: Maarten van Heemskerck – Dutch portrait and religious painter (died 1574)
- 1499: Hans Asper - Swiss painter (died 1571)
- 1499: Michael Coxcie - painter (died 1592)
- 1499: Giulio Romano – Italian painter and architect (died 1546)
- 1499: Jan van Calcar – Netherlandish-born Italian painter, pupil of Titian (died 1546)

== Deaths ==
- 1491: Martin Schongauer – German engraver and painter (born 1448)
- 1491: Dieric Bouts the Younger - Belgian painter of the Early Netherlandish painting era (born 1448)
- 1491: Neri di Bicci, painter in Florence (born 1419)
- 1491: Domenico di Michelino – Italian painter of the Florentine school (born 1417)
- 1491: Bertoldo di Giovanni – sculptor (born c. 1435/1440)
- October 12, 1492: Piero della Francesca – painter (born 1412)
- 1492: Domenico Gagini – Italian sculptor (born 1449)
- 1492: Lucas Moser - German Late-Gothic painter (born 1421)
- 1492: Andreas Ritzos - Greek icons painter (born 1421)
- 1493: Jean Colombe - French miniature painter and illuminator of manuscripts (born 1430)
- 1493: Simone Ferrucci - Italian sculptor (born 1437)
- 1493: Jacopo da Sellaio – Italian painter from the Florentine School (born 1442)
- January 11, 1494: Domenico Ghirlandaio – Florentine painter (born 1449)
- March 2, 1494: Niccolò dell'Arca - Italian sculptor (born c. 1435/40)
- 1494: Melozzo da Forlì – Italian fresco painter and member of the Forlì painting school (born 1438)
- 1494: Ludwig Schongauer, German painter (born 1440)
- 1494: Giovanni Santi – Italian painter, poet, and father of Raphael (born 1435)
- 1494: Hans Memling – Early Netherlandish painter (born 1430)
- 1495: Carlo Crivelli – Italian Renaissance painter of conservative Late Gothic decorative sensibility (born 1430)
- 1495: Geertgen tot Sint Jans – Early Netherlandish painter from the northern Low Countries (born 1465)
- 1495: Matteo di Giovanni - Italian Renaissance artist from the Sienese School (born 1430)
- 1495: Antoine Le Moiturier - French sculptor (born 1425)
- 1495: Cosmè Tura – Italian early-Renaissance painter and one of the founders of the School of Ferrara (born 1430)
- 1495/1496: Pietro Vannini – Italian artist and silversmith (born 1413/1414)
- 1495/1496: Antonio Missaglia – Italian armourer (born 1416/1417)
- 1496: Pietro di Francesco degli Orioli – sculptor (born 1458)
- 1496: Benedetto Bonfigli - Italian painter active around Umbria (born 1420)
- 1496: Piero del Pollaiuolo – painter (born 1443)
- 1497: Heinrich Bichler – Swiss painter (born 1446)
- 1497: Benedetto da Maiano – sculptor (born 1442)
- 1497: Benozzo Gozzoli – Italian Renaissance painter from Florence (born 1421)
- February 4, 1498: Antonio del Pollaiuolo – painter (born c. 1429/1433)
- 1498: Domenico Rosselli – sculptor (born 1439)
- 1498: Bartolomé Bermejo – Spanish painter who adopted Dutch painting techniques (born 1440)
- 1498: Fra Diamante – Italian fresco painter (born 1430)
- 1498: Michael Pacher – Austrian Tyrolean painter and sculptor (born 1435)
- 1498: Marco Zoppo - Italian painter active mainly in Bologna (born 1433)
- 1498: Juan de la Abadía - Spanish painter in the gothic Spanish-Flemish style (born unknown)
- 1499: Alesso Baldovinetti – painter (born 1427)
- 1499: Adriano Fiorentino - Italian medallist and sculptor (died 1440)
