= 1551 in art =

List of years in art	(table)
- … 1541; 1542; 1543; 1544; 1545; 1546; 1547; 1548; 1549; 1550; 1551; 1552; 1553; 1554; 1555; 1556; 1557; 1558; 1559; 1560; 1561 …
- Art; Archaeology; Architecture; Literature; Music; Philosophy; Science; +...

Events from the year 1551 in art.

== Events ==
- Cristóvão Lopes succeeds his father Gregório Lopes as the royal painter of King John III of Portugal

== Paintings ==
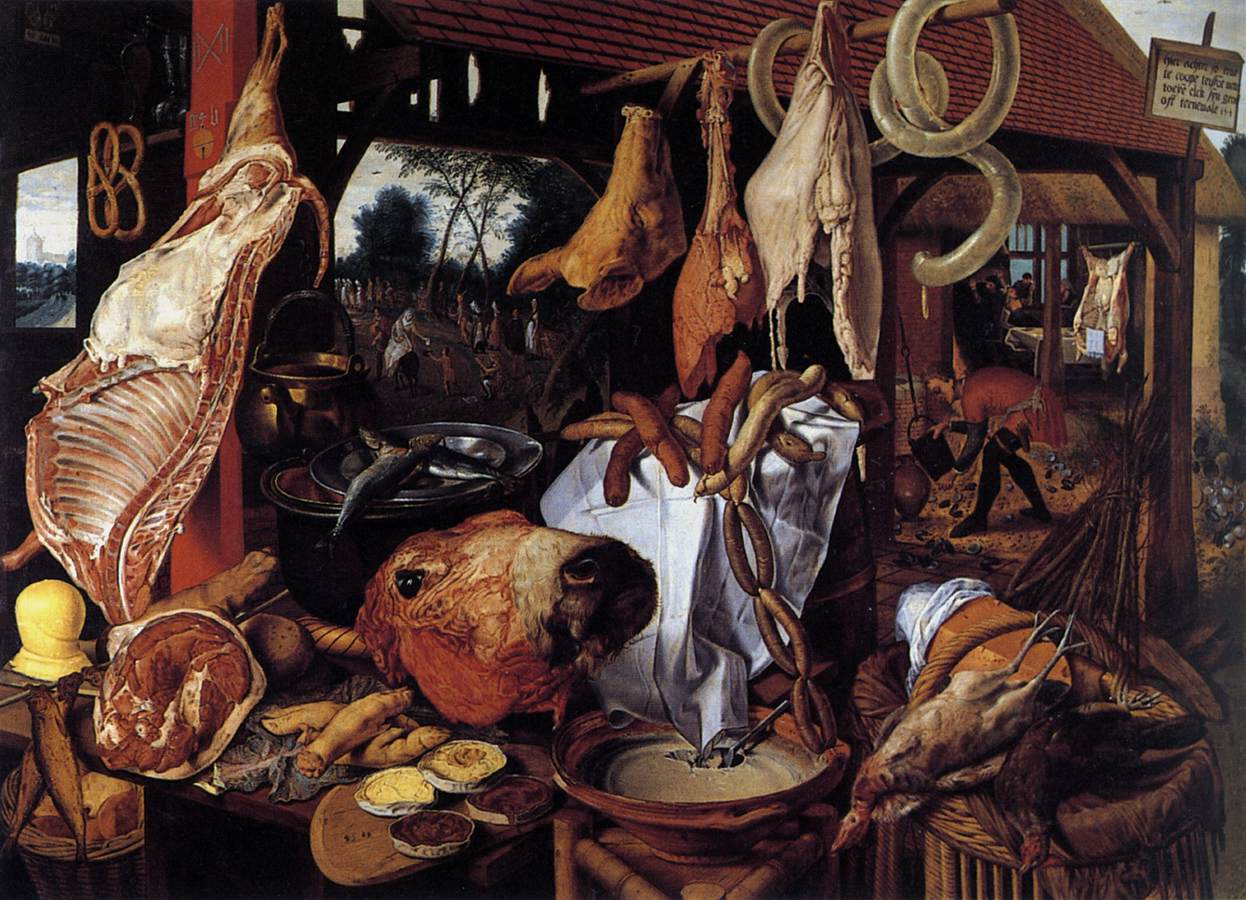
Aertsen – A Meat Stall with the Holy Family Giving Alms, Gustavianum

- Pieter Aertsen – A Meat Stall with the Holy Family Giving Alms
- Pietro Negroni – Madonna with Child in Glory and Saints Paul and Luke
- Titian – Philip II in Armour
- Caterina van Hemessen – Portrait of a Lady (approximate date; Bowes Museum)

== Births ==
- March 9 - Alessandro Alberti, Italian painter (died 1596)
- April 30 - Jacopo da Empoli, Italian Mannerist painter (died 1640)
- Luigi Benfatto, Italian painter, nephew of Paolo Veronese (died 1611)
- Jacopo Chimenti, Italian late-mannerist painter (died 1640)
- Camillo Procaccini, Italian painter, in 1571 a student in the Bolognese painters’ guild (died 1629)
- Tiburzio Vergelli, Italian sculptor and founder (died 1609)
- probable
  - 1551/1552: John de Critz, Flemish portrait painter active in England (died 1642)

== Deaths ==
- May 18 - Domenico di Pace Beccafumi, Italian Renaissance-Mannerist painter (born 1486)
- July - Adriaen Isenbrandt, Flemish Northern Renaissance painter (born 1480-1490)
- July 11 - Girolamo Genga, Italian painter and architect (born 1476)
- date unknown
  - Diego de Arroyo, Spanish miniature painter (born 1498)
  - Nicolas Chantereine, French sculptor and architect (born c.1485)
  - Étienne Peson, French "primitive" painter (born 1485)
  - Shin Saimdang, Korean genre works painter and calligraphist (born 1504)
  - Juan de Villoldo, Spanish religious painter (date of birth unknown)
