= 1546 in art =

| List of years in art | (table) |
- … 1536; 1537; 1538; 1539; 1540; 1541; 1542; 1543; 1544; 1545; 1546; 1547; 1548; 1549; 1550; 1551; 1552; 1553; 1554; 1555; 1556 …
- Art; Archaeology; Architecture; Literature; Music; Philosophy; Science; +...

Events from the year 1546 in art.

== Events ==
- The plan for the new St. Peter's Basilica dome, begun by Bramante, is continued by the new chief architect, Michelangelo.
- The Farnese Hercules is removed from the Baths of Caracalla by Cardinal Cardinal Alessandro Farnese to the Palazzo Farnese in Rome.

== Works ==
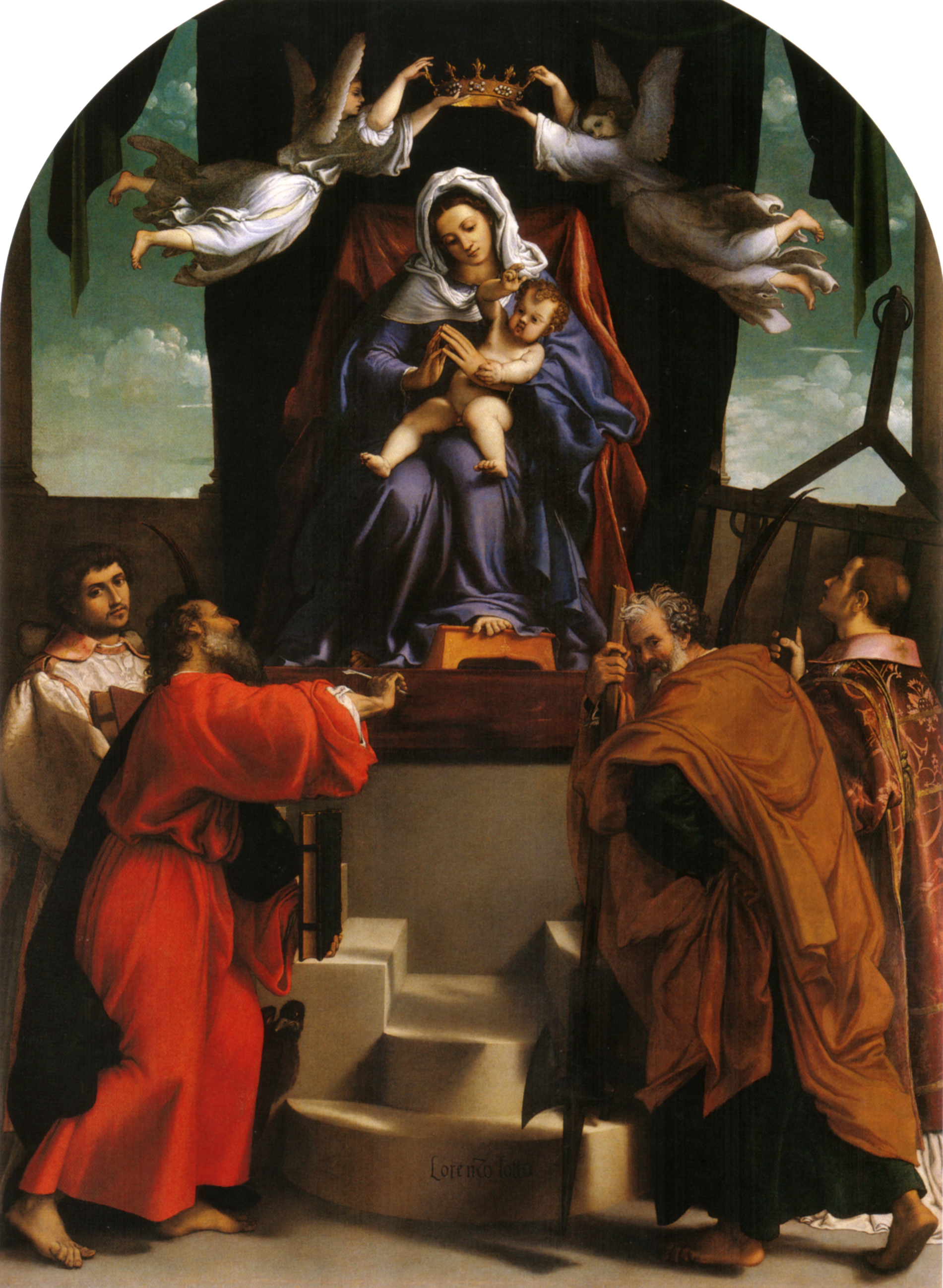
Lotto – San Giacomo dell'Orio Altarpiece

=== Paintings ===
- Domenico Beccafumi – Pagan Child Couple
- Jacopo Bassano – The Adoration of the Shepherds
- Girolamo Siciolante da Sermoneta – Holy Family with Saint Michael
- Lorenzo Lotto – San Giacomo dell'Orio Altarpiece
- William Scrots
  - Anamorphic portrait of Edward, Prince of Wales
  - Henry Howard Earl of Surrey (attributed)
  - Elizabeth as a princess
- Titian – Pope Paul III and his Grandsons

== Births ==
- March 21 - Bartholomeus Spranger, Flemish Northern Mannerist painter, draughtsman, and etcher (died 1611)

== Deaths ==
- January 4 - Camillo Boccaccino, Italian painter active mainly in Cremona and regions of Lombardy (born 1511)
- January 11 - Gaudenzio Ferrari, Italian painter and sculptor of the Renaissance (born 1471)
- August 1 - Peter Faber (or Pierre Favre), French Jesuit painter and sculptor (born 1506)
- October 23 - Peter Flötner, German designer, sculptor, and printmaker (born 1490)
- November 1 - Giulio Romano, Italian painter and architect (born 1499)
- date unknown
  - Valerio Belli, Italian engraver and medallion maker (born 1470)
  - Jan van Calcar, Netherlands-born Italian painter, pupil of Titian (born 1499)
  - Bartolomeo Veneto - Italian portrait painter (born 1502)
- probable - Marinus van Reymerswaele, Dutch Renaissance painter (born 1490
