= 1544 in art =

List of years in art	(table)
- … 1534; 1535; 1536; 1537; 1538; 1539; 1540; 1541; 1542; 1543; 1544; 1545; 1546; 1547; 1548; 1549; 1550; 1551; 1552; 1553; 1554 …
- Art; Archaeology; Architecture; Literature; Music; Philosophy; Science; +...

Events from the year 1544 in art.

== Events ==
- September 10 - Italian painter Girolamo da Treviso is killed by cannon shot at the First Siege of Boulogne while working as a military engineer for Henry VIII of England.

== Works ==
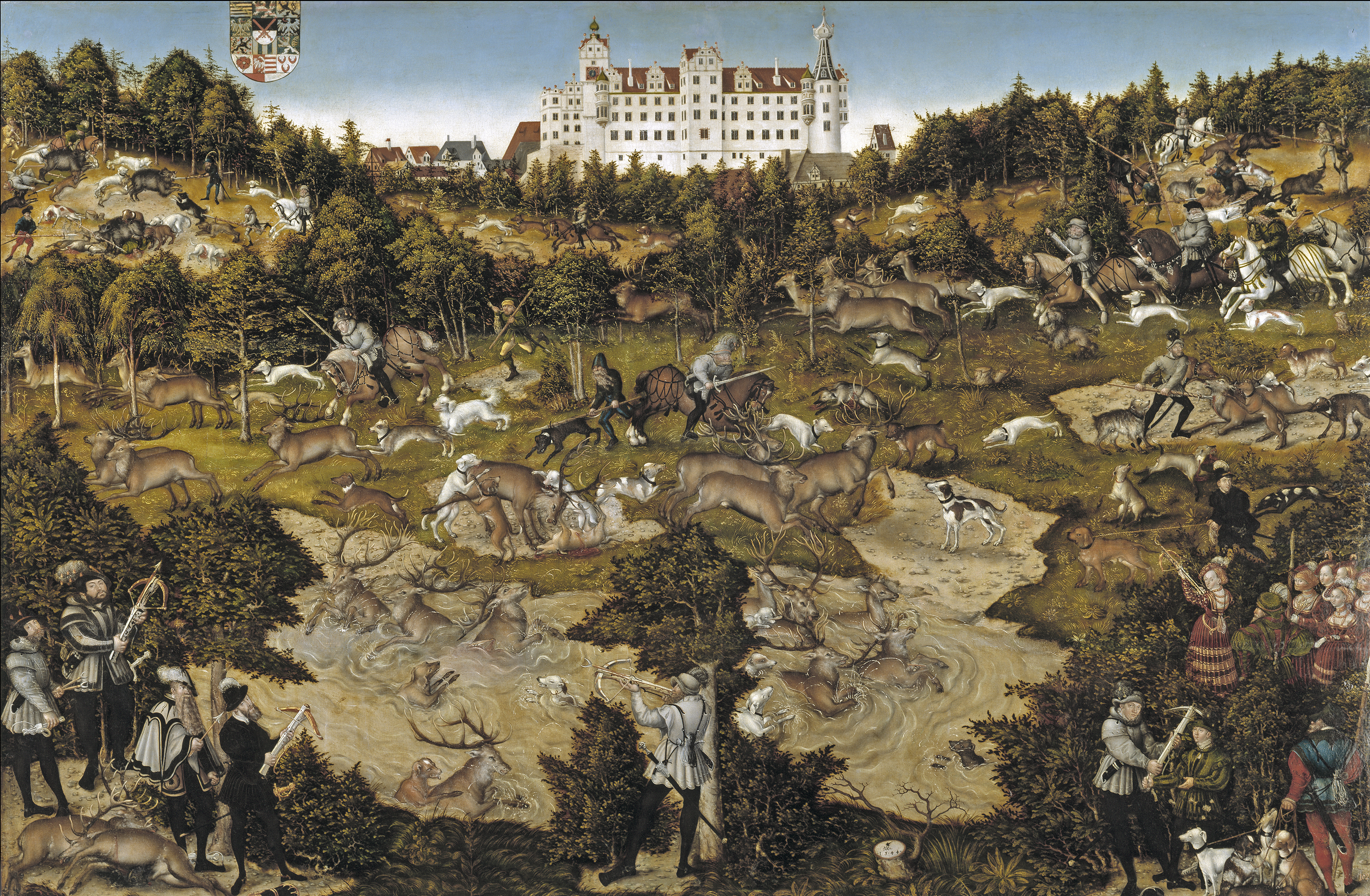
Cranach – Hunt in Honour of Charles V at the Castle of Torgau, Museo del Prado

- Hans Baldung - The Seven Ages of Woman
- Luca Cambiaso – Hercules
- Lucas Cranach the Younger – Hunt in Honour of Charles V at the Castle of Torgau
- Master John – Lady Mary, daughter to... King Henry the Eighth
- Giorgio Vasari - Six Tuscan Poets

== Births ==
- January 24 - Gillis van Coninxloo, Dutch painter of forest landscapes (died 1607)
- date unknown
  - Jacopo Bertoia, Italian painter of a late-Renaissance or Mannerist style (died 1574)
  - Giovanni Guerra, Italian draughtsman and painter (died 1618)
  - Ambrosius Francken I, Flemish painter (died 1616)
  - Jan de Hoey, Dutch painter (died 1615)
  - Francesco Morandini, Italian painter active in Florence (died 1597)
  - Joos van Winghe, Flemish painter (died 1603)

== Deaths ==
- July 17 - Giovanni Antonio Sogliani, Italian painter (born 1492)
- September 10 - Girolamo da Treviso, Italian painter (born 1508)
- date unknown
  - Chén Chún, Chinese artist specializing in "ink and wash" paintings (born 1483)
  - Vincenzo Civerchio, Italian painter of the Renaissance (born 1470)
  - Jost de Negker, Dutch woodcut-maker, printer and publisher (born 1485)
  - Lucas Horenbout, Flemish artist and court miniaturist to King Henry VIII of England (born 1490/1495)
  - Alessandro Oliverio, Italian painter (born 1500)
