= 1555 in art =

List of years in art	(table)
- … 1545; 1546; 1547; 1548; 1549; 1550; 1551; 1552; 1553; 1554; 1555; 1556; 1557; 1558; 1559; 1560; 1561; 1562; 1563; 1564; 1565 …
- Art; Archaeology; Architecture; Literature; Music; Philosophy; Science; +...

Events from the year 1555 in art.

== Events ==
- Villa Giulia is completed, which now houses the National Etruscan Museum's collection of Etruscan civilization art and artifacts

== Paintings ==
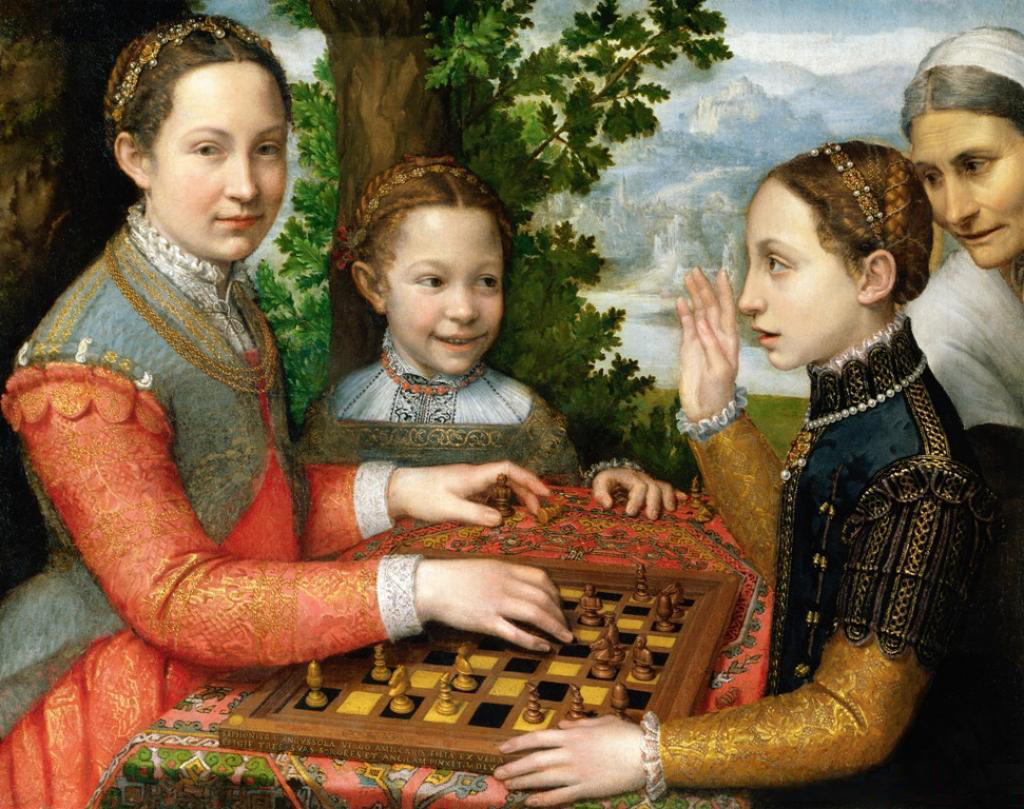
Sofonisba Anguissola - The Chess Players (National Museum, Poznań)

- Sofonisba Anguissola - Lucia, Minerva and Europa Anguissola Playing Chess
- Cristofano Gherardi - Transfiguration (Cortona)
- c. 1555 – Titian
  - Venus with a Mirror
  - Venus and Musician (Museo del Prado's second version)
- c.1555 - Paolo Veronese - Venus Disarming Cupid
- c. 1555-1560 – Illuminated tughra of Sultan Suleiman, from Istanbul, Turkey (now in The Metropolitan Museum of Art, New York)

== Births ==
- April 21 – Ludovico Carracci, Italian painter (died 1619)
- date unknown
  - Carlo Antonio Procaccini, Italian painter of still lifes and landscapes (died unknown)
  - Dong Qichang, Chinese painter, scholar, calligrapher, and art theorist of the later period of the Ming dynasty (died 1636)
  - Aegidius Sadeler I, Flemish engraver of the Sadeler family (died 1609)
  - Antonio Tempesta, Florentine painter and engraver, worked in Rome, influenced by Counter-Mannerism (died 1630)
  - Giovanni Battista Trotti, Italian painter active mainly in his native city of Cremona (died 1612)
- probable
  - Jacob de Backer, Flemish Mannerist painter and draughtsman (died 1585)

== Deaths ==
- July 2 - Girolamo dai Libri, Italian illuminator of manuscripts and painter of altarpieces (born 1474/1475)
- date unknown
  - Giovanni Antonio Amato, Italian painter (born 1475)
  - Barthel Bruyn the Elder, German painter (born 1493)
  - Niccolò Giolfino, Italian painter (born 1476)
  - Gerolamo Giovenone, Italian painter (born c.1486)
- probable
  - (died 1555/1558): Giovanni Francesco Caroto, Italian painter active in Verona (born 1480)
  - (died 1555/1558): Benedetto Montagna, Italian engraver (born 1481)
  - (died 1555/1561): Heinrich Aldegrever, German painter and engraver (born 1502)
  - Herri met de Bles, Flemish Northern Renaissance and Mannerist landscape painter (born 1510)
  - Jan Mostaert, Dutch painter of portraits and religious subjects (born 1475)
  - Mir Musavvir, Persian illustrator and painter (born unknown)
