= 1567 in art =

Events from the year 1567 in art.

== Events ==
- In China, the Jiajing era (1522–1566) has ended.

== Paintings ==
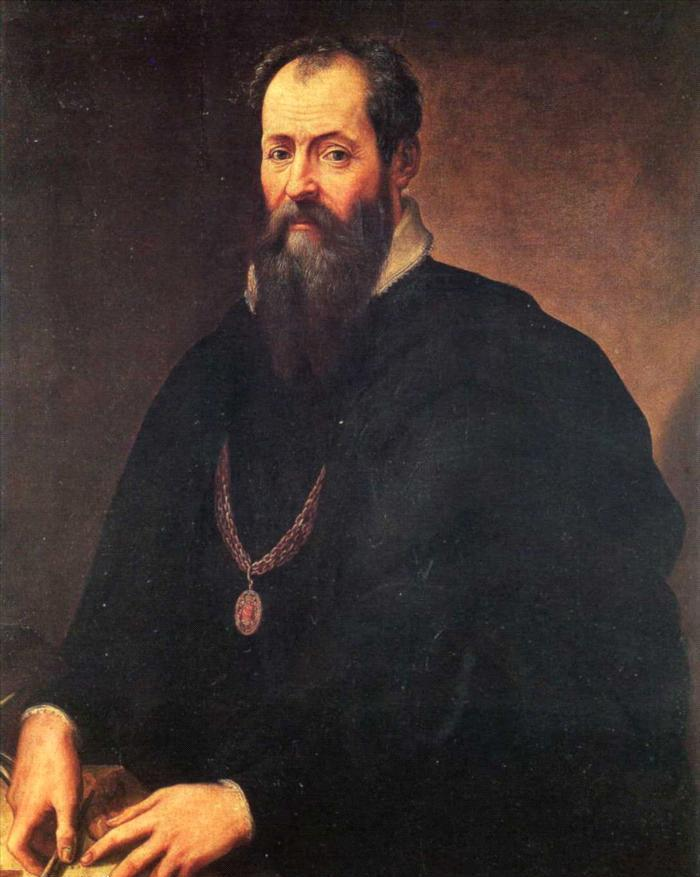
Giorgio Vasari, Self-portrait

- Federico Barocci – Madonna di San Simone (Galleria Nazionale delle Marche, Urbino)
- Pieter Bruegel the Elder
  - The Adoration of the Magi
  - The Massacre of the Innocents (1566-7)
  - The Peasant Wedding
- Gian Paolo Lomazzo – Allegory of the Lenten Feast (for San Agostino, Piacenza)
- Titian – Self-portrait (approximate date)
- Giorgio Vasari – Self-portrait (approximate date)

== Births ==
- 1 May - Michiel Jansz van Mierevelt, Dutch painter (died 1641)
- 24 September - Martin Fréminet, French painter and engraver (died 1619)
- date unknown
  - Nicolas Cordier, French sculptor, painter and printmaker (died 1612)
  - Giovanni Giacomo Pandolfi, Italian painter who worked in his native Pesaro (died 1636)
- 1567/1576: Abraham Janssens, Flemish painter (died 1632)

== Deaths ==
- 17 September - Pier Francesco d'Jacopo di Domenico Toschi, Italian painter of primarily religious works (born unknown)
- date unknown
  - Lambert Barnard, English Renaissance painter (born 1485)
  - Pier Francesco Foschi, Italian painter active in Florence in a Mannerist style (born 1502)
  - Dirck Jacobsz, Dutch Renaissance painter (born 1496)
  - Antonio Labacco, architect, engraver, and writer (born 1495)
  - Ligier Richier, French sculptor (born 1500)
  - Jakob Seisenegger, Austrian portrait painter used by Charles V (born 1505)
  - Enea Vico, Italian engraver (born 1523)
