= 1554 in art =

List of years in art	(table)
- … 1544; 1545; 1546; 1547; 1548; 1549; 1550; 1551; 1552; 1553; 1554; 1555; 1556; 1557; 1558; 1559; 1560; 1561; 1562; 1563; 1564 …
- Art; Archaeology; Architecture; Literature; Music; Philosophy; Science; +...

Events from the year 1554 in art.

== Events ==
- Gerlach Flicke, temporarily imprisoned in London with pirate Henry Strangways, paints a diptych of them both, which constitutes the earliest known self-portrait in oils in England.
- A group of Edinburgh painters, led by one Walter Binning, assault an outsider, David Warkman, who has been painting a ceiling in the city.

== Works ==
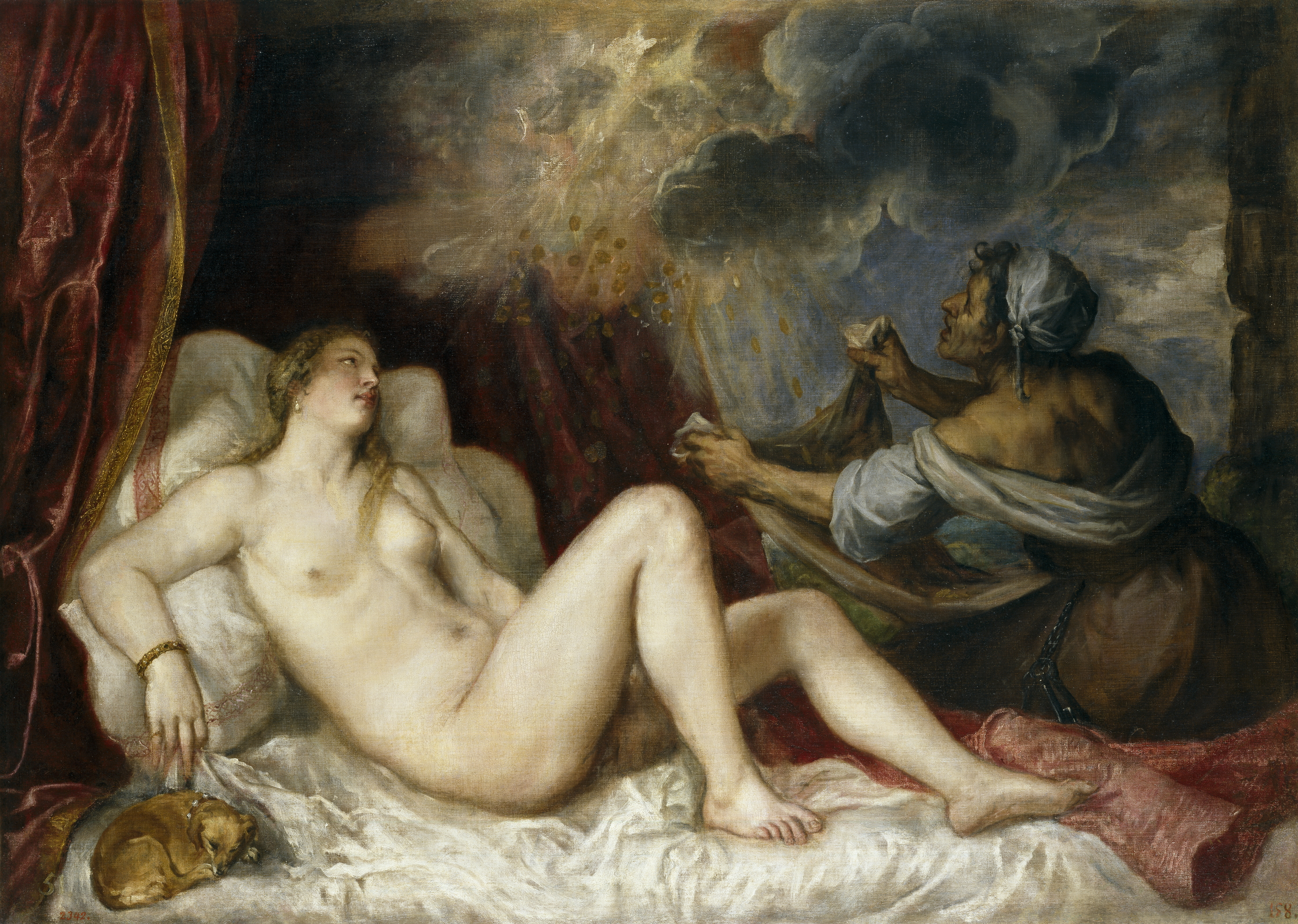
Titian, Danae, 1554

=== Paintings ===
- Hans Eworth – Queen Mary Tudor
- Gerlach Flicke – Self-portrait with Henry Strangwish
- Antonis Mor – Queen Mary Tudor
- Titian – Danae and Christ Appearing to his Mother after his Resurrection

=== Sculptures ===
- Benvenuto Cellini – Perseus with the Head of Medusa

== Births ==
- February 27 - Giovanni Battista Paggi, Italian painter (died 1627)
- date unknown
  - Paul Brill, landscape painter of frescoes who worked in Rome (died 1626)
  - Cesare Corte, Italian painter active mainly in his natal city of Genoa (died 1613)
  - Augustin Cranach, German painter, son of Lucas Cranach the Younger (died 1595)
  - Costantini de' Servi, Italian painter (died 1622)
  - Mir Emad Hassani, Persian Nastaʿlīq script calligrapher (died 1615)
  - Rombertus van Uylenburgh, father-in-law of Rembrandt (died 1624)
- probable - William Segar, court painter to Queen Elizabeth I of England (died 1633)

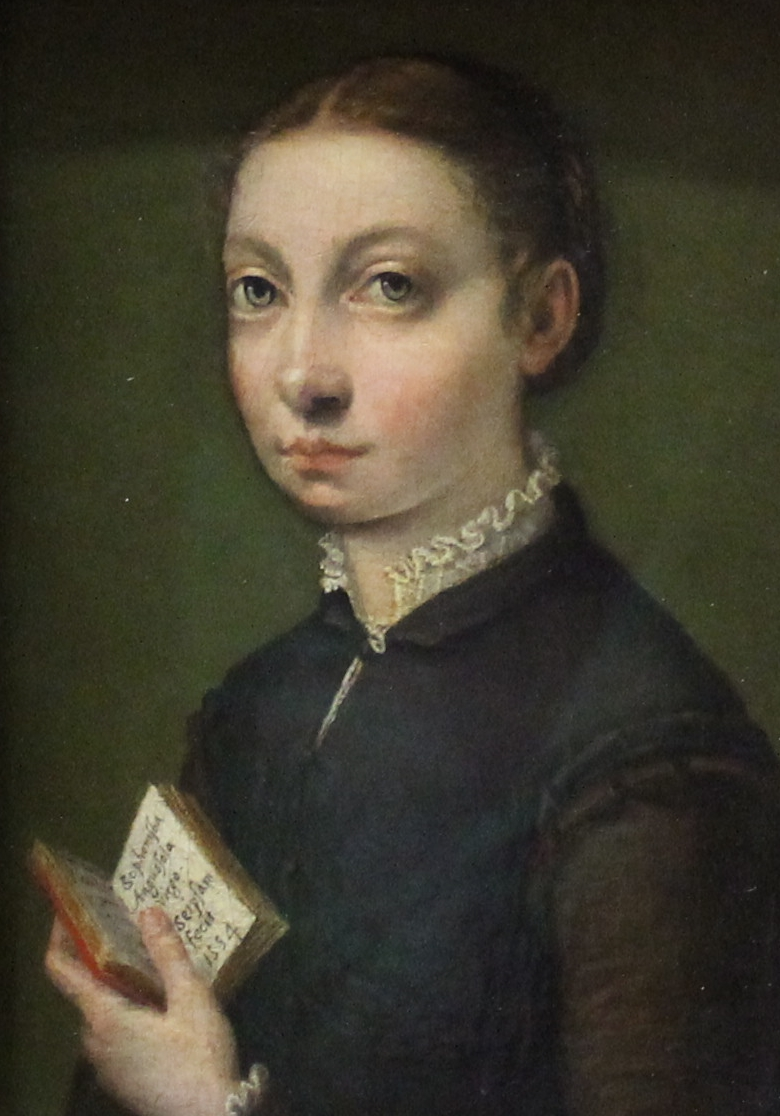
Self-portrait of Sofonisba Anguissola - 1554

== Deaths ==
- April - Simone Mosca, Italian sculptor (born 1492)
- December 22 - Moretto da Brescia, Italian Renaissance painter of Brescia and Venice (born 1498)
- date unknown
  - Giovanni Francesco Rustici, Italian Renaissance painter and sculptor (born 1474)
  - Anthony Toto, Italian painter and architect (born 1498)
- probable
  - Michelangelo Anselmi, Italian Renaissance-Mannerist painter active mostly in Parma (born 1492)
  - Hans Brosamer, German engraver, wood-cutter, and portraitist (born 1506)
