= 1574 in art =

Events from the year 1574 in art.

== Events ==
- Niccolò Circignani decorates the "Room of the Exploits" in the Palazzo del Comune at Castiglione del Lago.

== Works ==
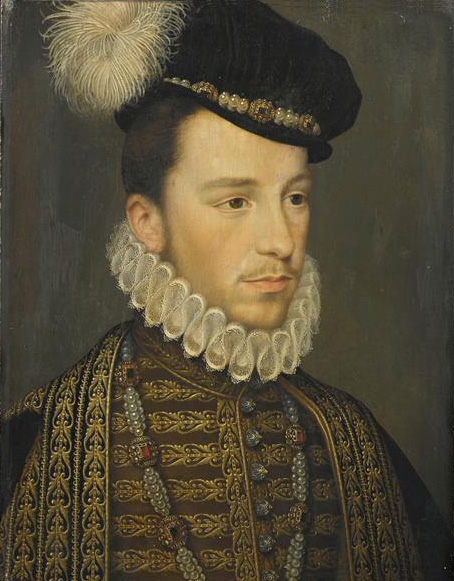
de Court's portrait miniature of Henri, Duke of Anjou

- Niccolò Circignani - Frescos at Palazzo della Corgna in Castiglione del Lago
- Jean de Court - Henri, Duke of Anjou
- Corneille de Lyon - Gabrielle de Rochechouart
- Hans von Aachen - Self-portrait (approximate date)

== Births ==
- April - Matteo Zaccolini, Italian painter, priest and author of the late Mannerist and early Baroque periods (died 1630)
- May 14 - Daniel Dumonstier, French portraitist in crayon (died 1646)
- date unknown
  - Francesco Brizio, Italian painter and engraver of the Bolognese School (died 1623)
  - Baccio Ciarpi, Italian painter (died 1654)
  - Guillaume Dupré, French sculptor and medallist (died 1643)
  - Nicodemo Ferrucci, Italian painter of the Baroque period (died 1650)
  - Giulio Cesare Procaccini, Italian painter and sculptor of Milan (died 1625)
  - Wen Zhenmeng, Chinese Ming Dynasty painter, calligrapher, scholar, author, and garden designer (died 1636)

== Deaths ==
- March 18 – Lattanzio Gambara, Italian painter, active in Renaissance and Mannerist styles (born 1530)
- June 27 – Giorgio Vasari, Italian painter and architect (born 1511)
- October - Carlo Portelli, Italian painter (date of birth unknown)
- October 1 - Marten van Heemskerk, Dutch portrait and religious painter (born 1498)
- December 10 - Ascanio Condivi, Italian painter and writer, primarily remembered as the biographer of Michelangelo (born 1525)
- date unknown
  - Ascanio Condivi, Italian painter and writer (born 1525)
  - Hans Eworth, Flemish painter (born 1520)
  - Camillo Filippi, Italian painter (date of birth unknown)
  - Francesco Menzocchi, Italian painter (born 1502)
- probable
  - Joachim Beuckelaer, Flemish painter primarily of scenes of kitchen and markets (born 1533)
  - Jacopo Bertoia, Italian painter (born 1544)
  - Giulio Bonasone, Italian painter and engraver (born 1498)
  - Marco d'Agrate, Italian sculptor (born 1504)
