= 1533 in art =

Events from the year 1533 in art.

== Works ==
The Ambassadors (Holbein)

- Bronzino - "Portrait of a Young Man as Saint Sebastian"
- Hans Holbein the Younger
  - The Ambassadors
  - Thomas Cromwell (Frick Collection)
- Titian
  - Penitent Magdalene
  - Portrait of Charles V with a Dog (copy)
  - Portrait of Ippolito de' Medici

== Births ==
- Giovanni Battista da Ponte, Italian painter active in Venice and his native Bassano del Grappa (died 1613)
- Sadiqi Beg, Persian poet, biographer, draftsman, soldier and miniaturist of the Safavid dynasty period (died 1610)
- Joachim Beuckelaer, Flemish painter primarily of scenes of kitchen and markets (died 1574)
- Cornelis Cort, Dutch engraver and draughtsman (died 1578)
- Giovanni Antonio Dosio, Italian architect and sculptor (died 1609)
- Sun Kehong, Chinese landscape painter, calligrapher, and poet (died 1611)
- Jacques Le Moyne de Morgues, French artist and member of Jean Ribault's expedition to the New World (died 1588)
- Pompeo Leoni, Italian sculptor and medallist (died 1608)

== Deaths ==
- August 8 - Lucas van Leyden, Dutch engraver and painter (born 1494)
- September - Veit Stoss, German engraver, painter, and sculptor (born 1445/1450)
- date unknown
  - Jacob Cornelisz van Oostsanen, Northern Netherlandish designer of woodcuts and painter (born 1470)
  - Girolamo del Pacchia, Italian painter (born 1477)
