= Pier Francesco d'Jacopo di Domenico Toschi =

Italian painter

Pier Francesco d'Jacopo di Domenico Toschi (died September 17, 1567) was an Italian painter of the Renaissance period. He was the son of a painter, living outside the Porta Romana in Florence. He was a pupil of Andrea del Sarto. Three pictures by him, an Assumption, a Transfiguration, and a Resurrection, are in the church of Santo Spirito, Florence. He was also much engaged on decorative work. He was buried in Santo Spirito.
