= A Meat Stall with the Holy Family Giving Alms =

Painting by Pieter Aertsen

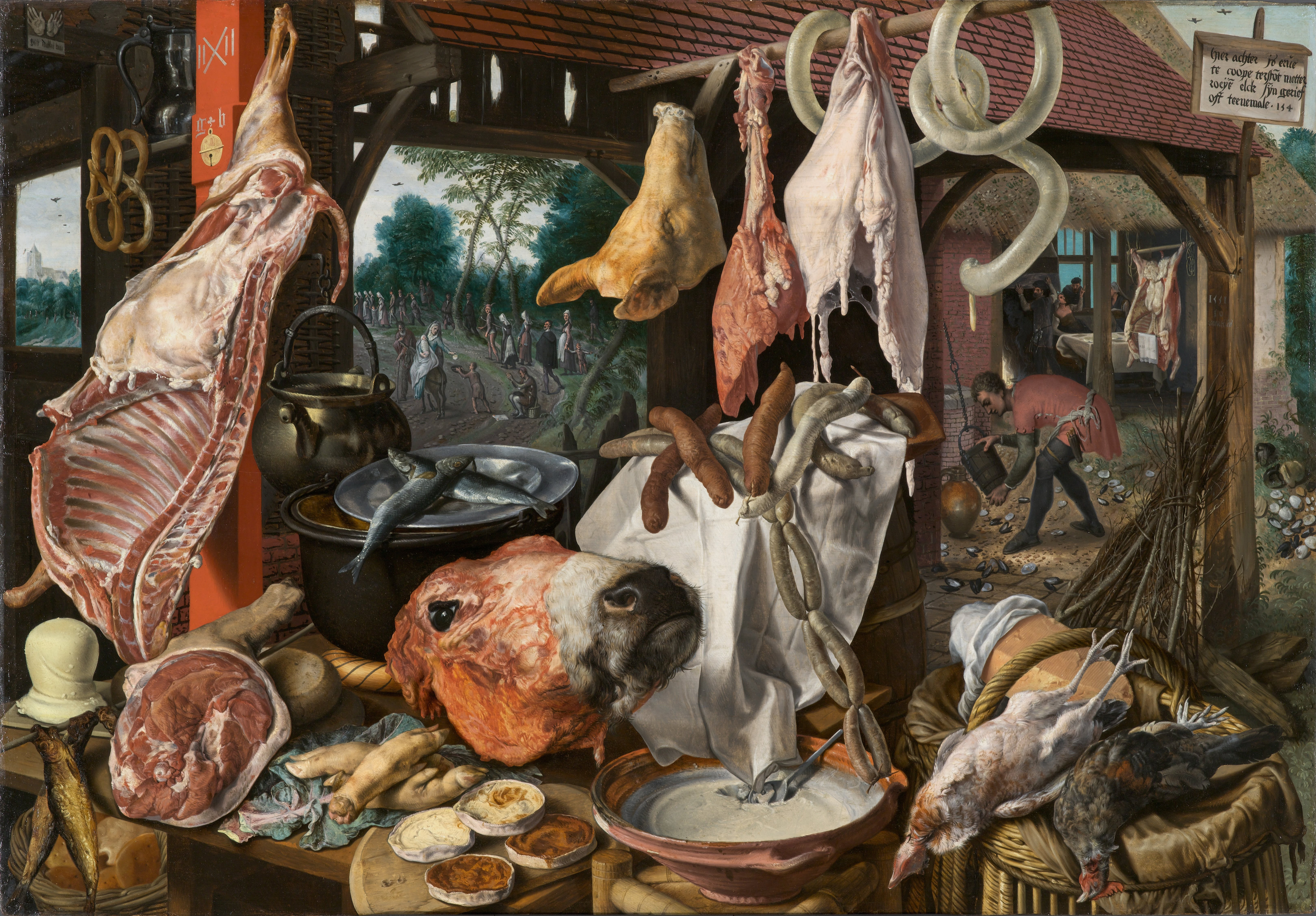
- Artist: Pieter Aertsen
- Year: 1551
- Medium: Oil on panel
- Dimensions: 115.6 cm × 165 cm (3' 10" in × 5' 5" in)
- Location: North Carolina Museum of Art, Raleigh, North Carolina, US

A Meat Stall with the Holy Family Giving Alms is a painting by the Dutch artist Pieter Aertsen (1508–1575). It was completed in 1551. A large painting, it depicts a peasant market scene, with an abundance of meats and other foods. In the background, it shows a scene from the biblical theme of the flight into Egypt, where the Virgin Mary is seen stopped on the road, giving alms to the poor. Thus, although the painting seems to be at first sight an ordinary still life concentrating on foodstuffs, it is rich with symbolism; it in fact hides a symbolic religious meaning, and embodies a visual metaphor encouraging spiritual life. Aertsen made a name for himself during the 1550s painting scenes from everyday life in a naturalistic manner.

== Painter ==
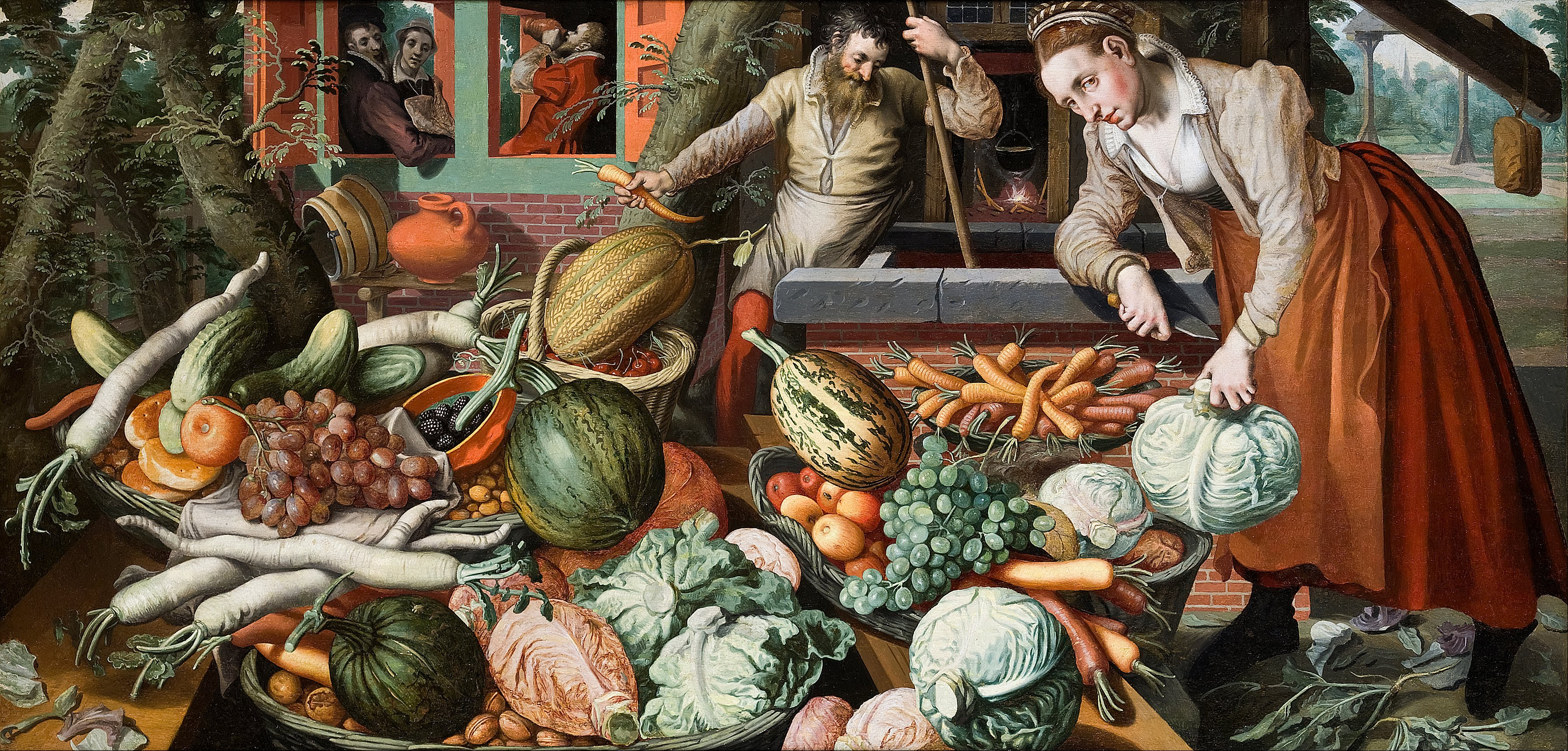
Aertsen's paintings of fruit and vegetable stalls, such as Market Scene (pictured), are similar in composition to that of A Meat Stall with the Holy Family Giving Alms.

Pieter Aertsen was a masterful still-life painter from Amsterdam, who worked for many years in Antwerp. He was a representative of the 16th-century Northern Renaissance style, more specifically Northern Mannerism, a new era for painting in the Netherlands and the German countries characterised by precise observation and naturalism that gave the art of painting impulses of realism. Many Northern artists travelled to Italy to study, where they were influenced by the innovations of the Italian Renaissance and in turn influenced the Italian Renaissance painters with techniques such as the newly developed technique of oil painting.

Aertsen is regarded as one of the founders of the still life painting. His style was particularly new: he mixed characteristics of the still life and the genre painting in his works, which, like A Meat Stall with the Holy Family Giving Alms, are seen as pioneers in the still life genre that grew out of details of paintings containing figure subjects. His compositions in the Flemish tradition were remarkably original, like this painting of a meat stall, with a large, life-size still life in the foreground and three smaller scenes appearing through openings in the background.

Since the Protestants rejected the tradition of Catholic arts, many of Aertsen's paintings were destroyed by the iconoclasts, especially his altarpieces, some of which were chopped into pieces. Only the parts of the paintings containing the less religious details were spared. Thus, the era of religious paintings declined in the Protestant countries. Aertsen painted A Meat Stall a few years before he moved to Amsterdam from Antwerp.

== Painting ==
The artwork of A Meat Stall with the Holy Family Giving Alms consists of a large painting on panel in oil, depicting a profusion of foodstuffs in a highly realistic style, while the narrative is hidden in the background, seen through the stall windows and openings. Aertsen's paintings were often made in an "inverted still life" style in which the still-life aspects were in the foreground and the narrative aspects in the background. The viewer's senses are distracted by the rich display of various foods – plates in the foreground, meats, ham, lard, smoked fish, pigs' legs and head, bread, butter, milk, cheese and hanging pretzels (in the left corner) – that has been spread out in front of the viewer, and the figure subject is overwhelmed by the still-life composition. The various meats, including sausages, beef, fish, fowl and pork, are arranged on wooden tables, using baskets, pots and plates. A barrel and some wickerwork chairs serve as containers for the food items as well.

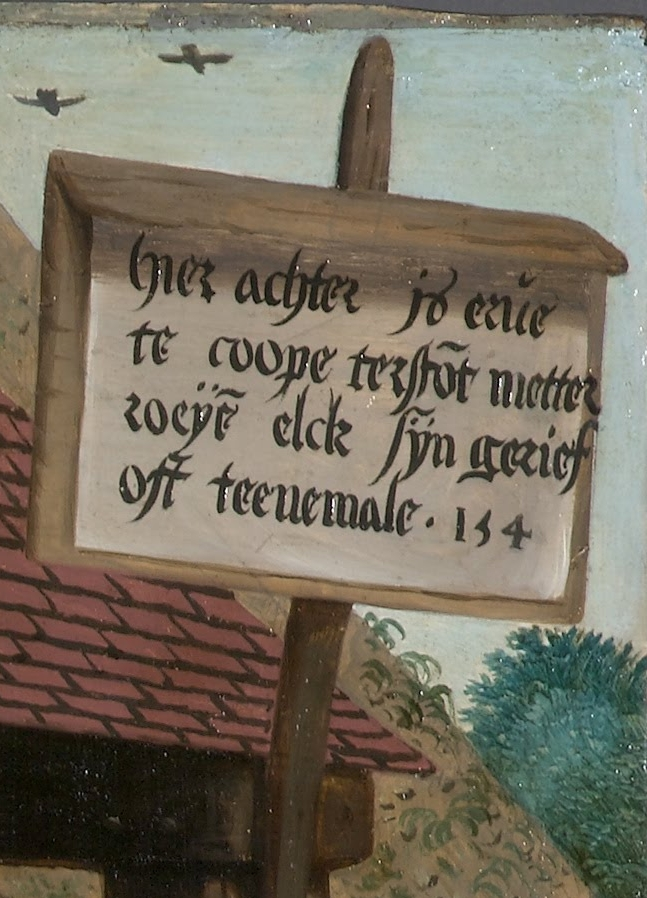
This sign reads in Flemish: "behind here are 154 rods of land for sale immediately, either by the rod according to your convenience or all at once".

Almost unnoticed at first are glimpses through the stall windows of an imaginary landscape with a road. Through the smaller window in the middle is a second landscape with a distant view. These small landscapes are hiding a religious narrative: they depict the Holy Family distributing alms on their journey to Egypt to escape from Herod's harassment. The other people depicted on the road are walking in the direction of the church. Both those people and the Holy family are dressed in contemporary Netherlandish clothing. On the right side, behind a figure drawing water from the well, there is a tavern with genre figures depicting a merry company eating oysters and mussels. In front of the tavern hangs a carcass that is very similar to Rembrandt's painting of a slaughtered ox.

The ground around the inn is covered with oyster shells, which allude to lust. In the tavern there is a scene showing the biblical theme of the prodigal son, and the woman depicted in the tavern may be a prostitute with her customers. The painting is rich with symbolic representation: it conveys hidden messages. The fish, displayed crossed on a pewter plate, are a reference to Lent, when the faithful abstained from eating meat. The contrast between the charity of the poor fugitives giving alms and the richness and abundance of the food conveys a certain religious symbolism and hidden meaning, linking to the idea of "food for the body" with the idea of "food for the soul", the spiritual "bread of life", appealing to the viewers to turn their attention away from the things of this world. The entire Holy Family is depicted in this part of the painting. Mary, holding the Christ child and riding a donkey, led by Joseph, offers bread to a poor family, sharing what little they have. The young boy and his father are receiving the bread from Mary, with the bread representing the Eucharist. The abundance and richness of the food in the stall is probably a satire on gluttony. The meat can also be seen as a symbolic representation of, and allusion to, the 'weak flesh' (Matthew 26:41). The slaughtered animals may symbolise the death of a believer, a fairly common iconography in the 16th and 17th centuries. (Note: It was quite common for theologians to see an allusion to the 'weak flesh' (cf. Matthew 26:41), which may well have been associated with Aertsen's Butcher's Stall where – as on his fruit and vegetable stalls – a seemingly infinite abundance of meat has been spread out.)

In the upper right-hand part of the painting, a handwritten sign is posted on a wood placard. In Flemish, the variety of the Dutch language spoken in Flanders in northern Belgium, it reads, "behind here are 154 rods of land for sale immediately, either by the rod according to your convenience or all at once". Scholarly discussion about the sign has reached a general consensus that the message "functions as a metaphorical commentary on this scene", conveying a warning about society losing spiritual wealth by placing too great an emphasis upon material gain.

== Versions ==
This painting is held by the North Carolina Museum of Art, but there are at least four versions of the same painting, indicating that it was a famous work at the time, often copied and admired. The different paintings, somewhat differing in size, are: A Meat Stall with the Holy Family Giving Alms at the North Carolina Museum of Art, 115 cm × 165 cm (45.5 in × 65 in); Butcher's Stall with the Flight into Egypt in Gustavianum, University Art Collections, Uppsala University, 124 cm × 169 cm (49 in × 67 in), workshop of the artist; Still Life with Meat and the Holy Family, 111 cm × 165 cm (43.5 in × 65 in), workshop of the artist, hosted at Fundación Banco Santander, and The meat stall with the flight into Egypt, hosted at Bonnefanten Museum, workshop of the artist.

Two versions of the painting

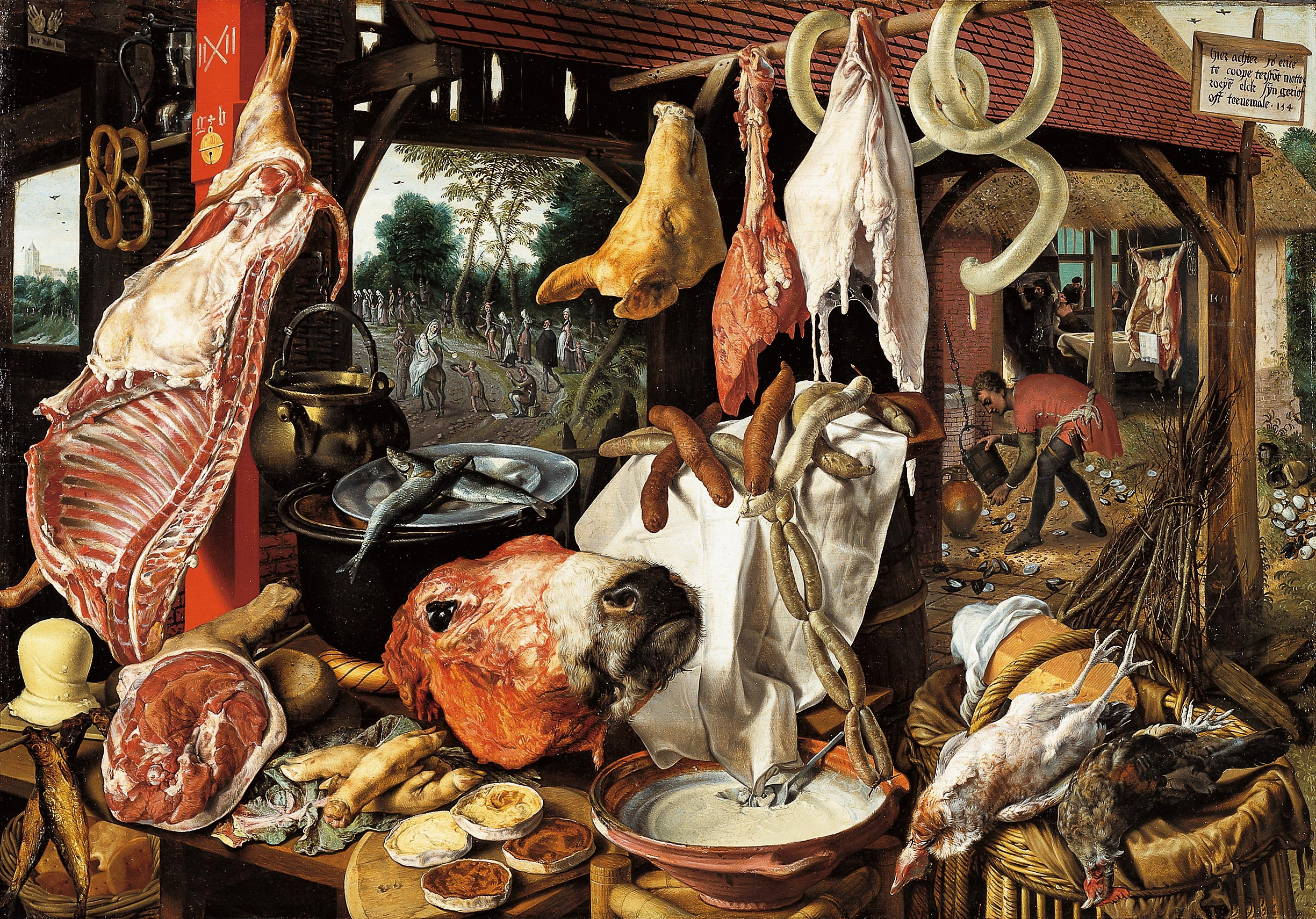
Butcher's Stall with the Flight into Egypt, Gustavianum, University Art Collections, Uppsala University, 1551

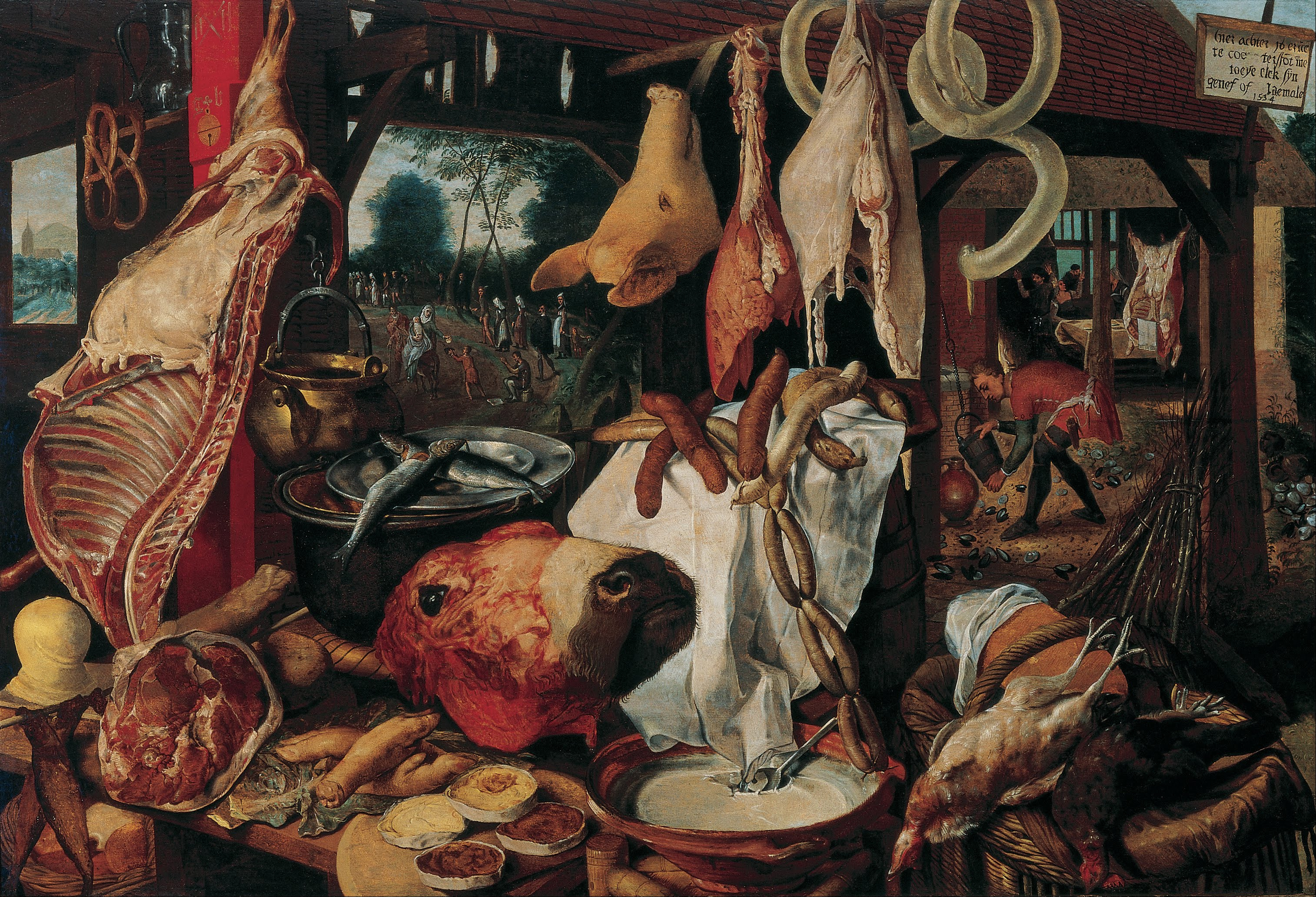
Still Life with Meat and the Holy Family, hosted at Fundación Banco Santander, 1551
