= Venus Disarming Cupid =

Painting by Paolo Veronese

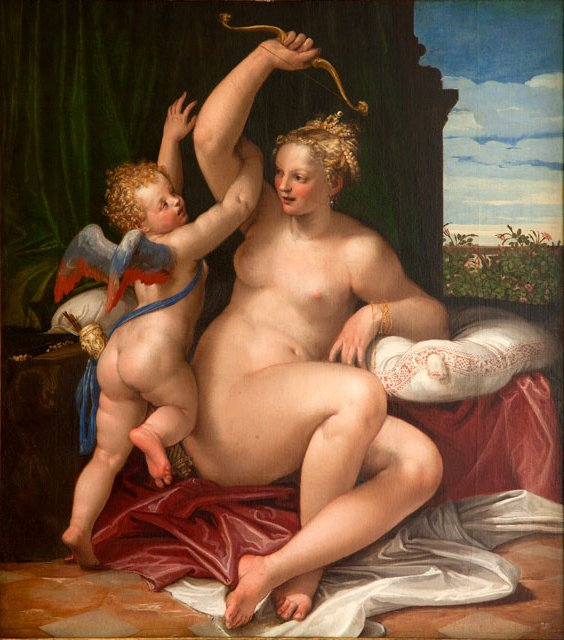
- Artist: Paolo Veronese
- Year: c. 1550
- Medium: Oil on canvas
- Dimensions: 158.8 cm × 138.4 cm (62.5 in × 54.5 in)
- Location: Worcester Art Museum; Worcester

Venus Disarming Cupid is an oil on canvas painting by the Venetian Renaissance master Paolo Veronese, from c. 1550.

The painting is set after the Roman poet Ovid's telling of the myth of Venus, Cupid, Adonis, and Mars in Book X of his masterwork, the Metamorphoses. It is one of several works Veronese painted of the subject. It depicts Venus disarming Cupid, but to no avail as she has already been pierced by his arrow and will soon fall for the ill-fated mortal Adonis.

The painting was given by the late art collector Hester Diamond to the Worcester Art Museum in 2013 in honor of her daughter-in-law Rachel Kaminsy, who sits on the museum's board. At the time of its acquisition by the museum it was one of the few works by Veronese remaining in private hands.
