= Rest on the Flight into Egypt (Cima) =

Painting by Cima da Conegliano

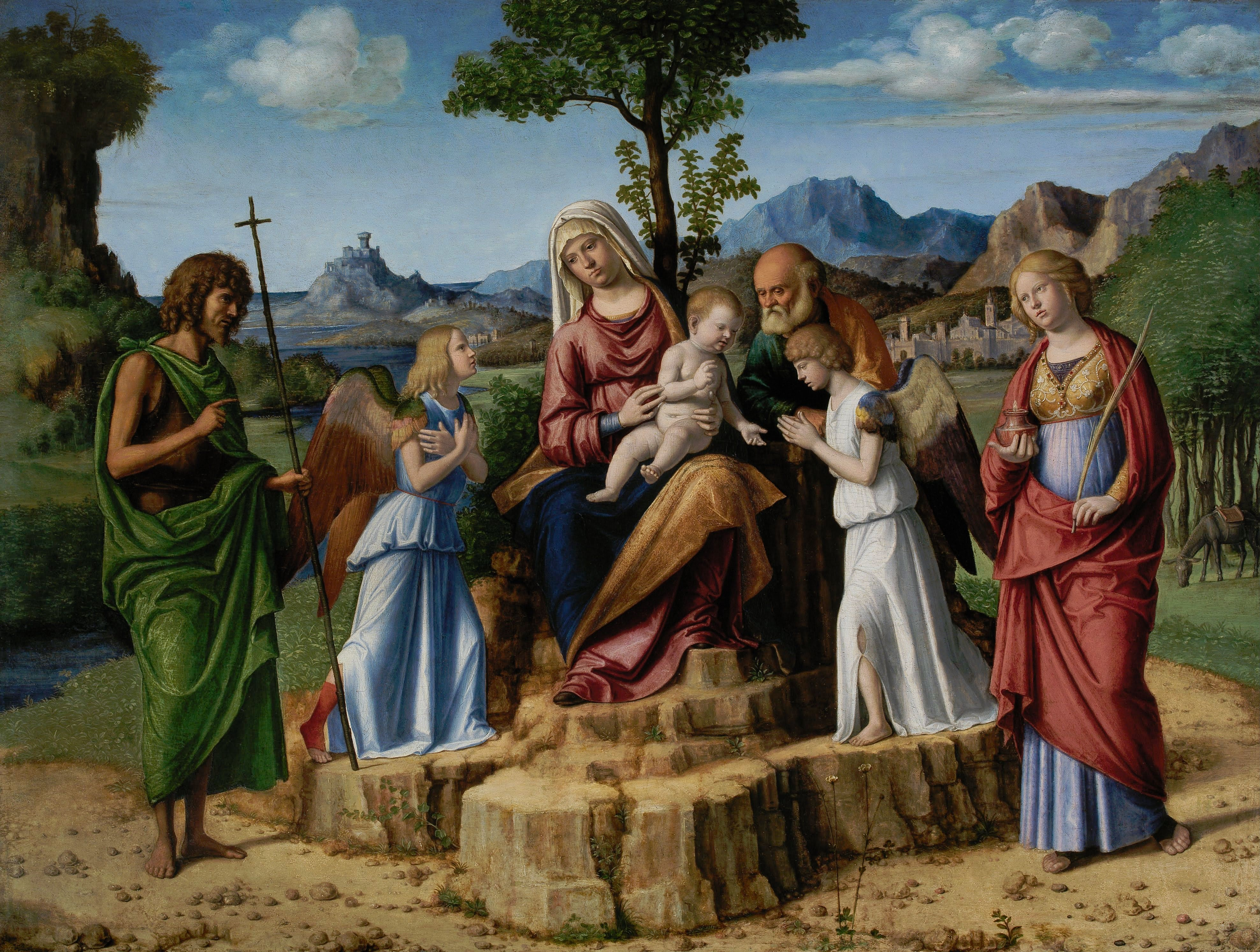
Rest on the Flight into Egypt (1496–1498) by Cima da Conegliano

Rest on the Flight into Egypt is a 1496–1498 oil on panel painting by Cima da Conegliano, now in the Calouste Gulbenkian Museum in Lisbon. Unusually for treatments of the scene, it also includes two saints, namely John the Baptist and Lucy.
