= Madonna and Child (Cima, Paris) =

Painting by Cima da Conegliano in the Petit Palais

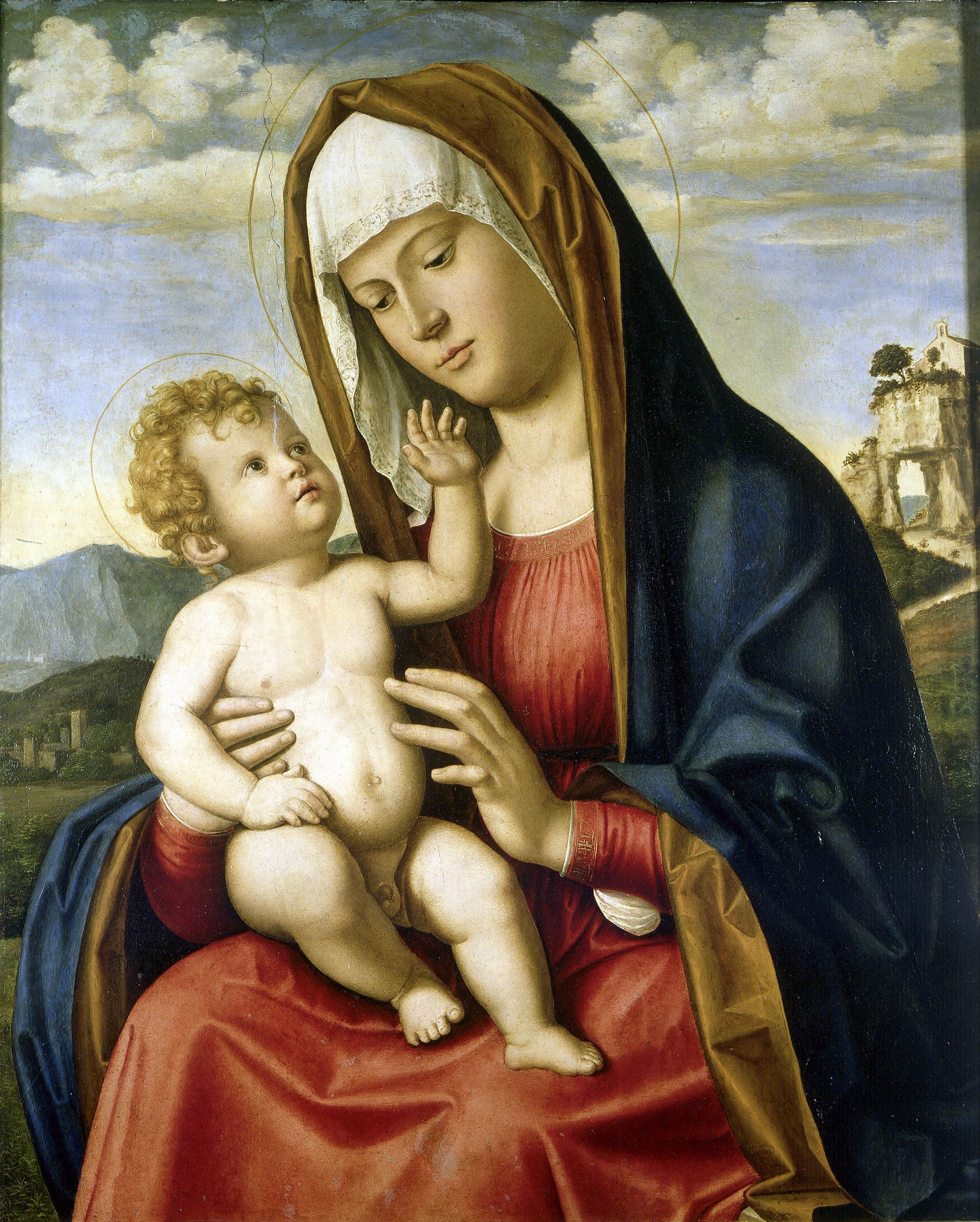
- Artist: Cima da Conegliano
- Year: 1495–1497
- Medium: Oil on panel
- Dimensions: 71.5 cm × 55 cm (28.1 in × 22 in)
- Location: Petit Palais, Paris

The Madonna and Child is an oil painting on panel of 1495–1497 by the Italian Renaissance artist Cima da Conegliano, now in the Petit Palais in Paris. It was owned in London by Sir William Abdy, then in Paris by Edward Tuck, the American vice-consul there; the latter gave it to its present owner in 1930.

Bernard Berenson, Detlev von Hadeln, Victor Lasareff and Menegazzi date the work to 1495 but Raimond van Marle and Luigi Coletti date it to 1497.
