= Allegories (Bellini) =

Italian panel paintings

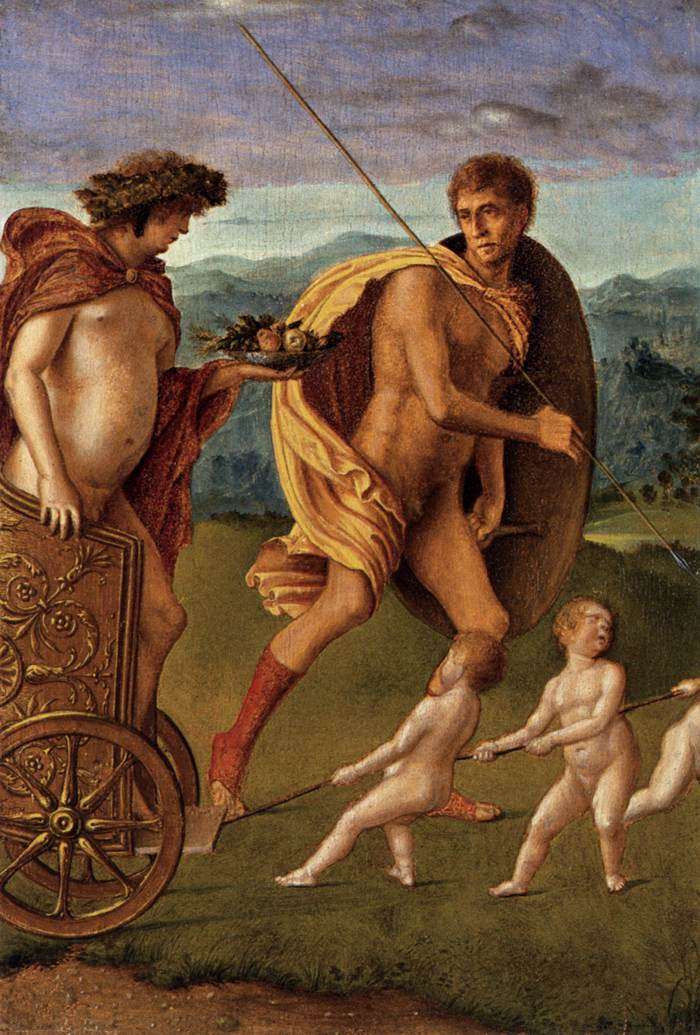
The Perseverance

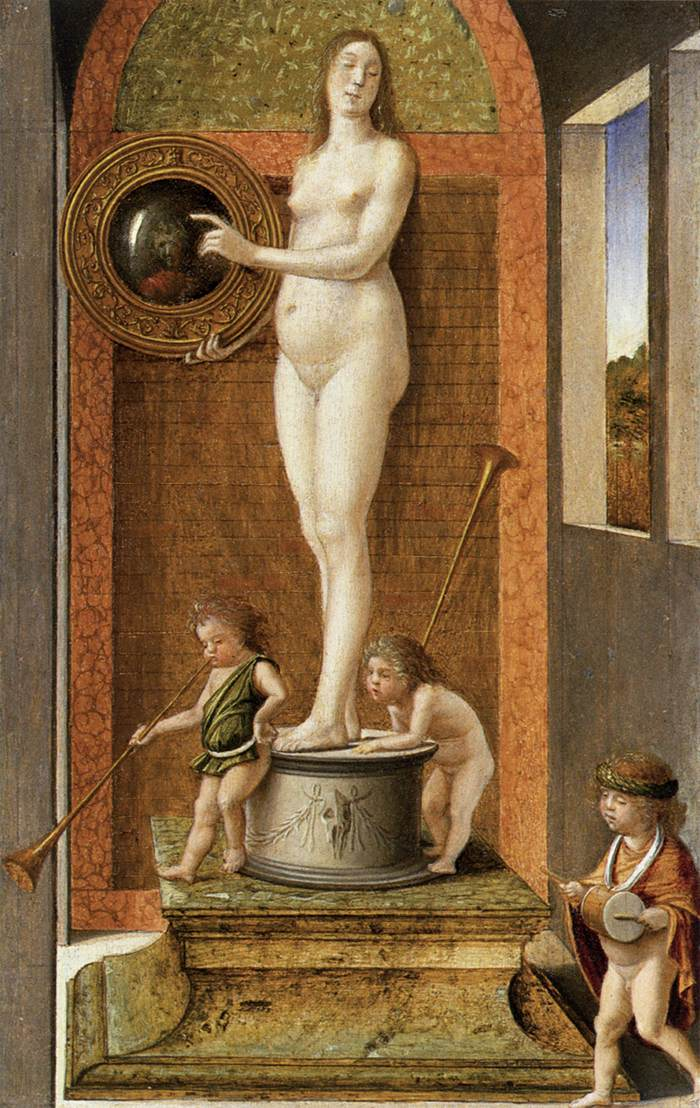
The Prudence

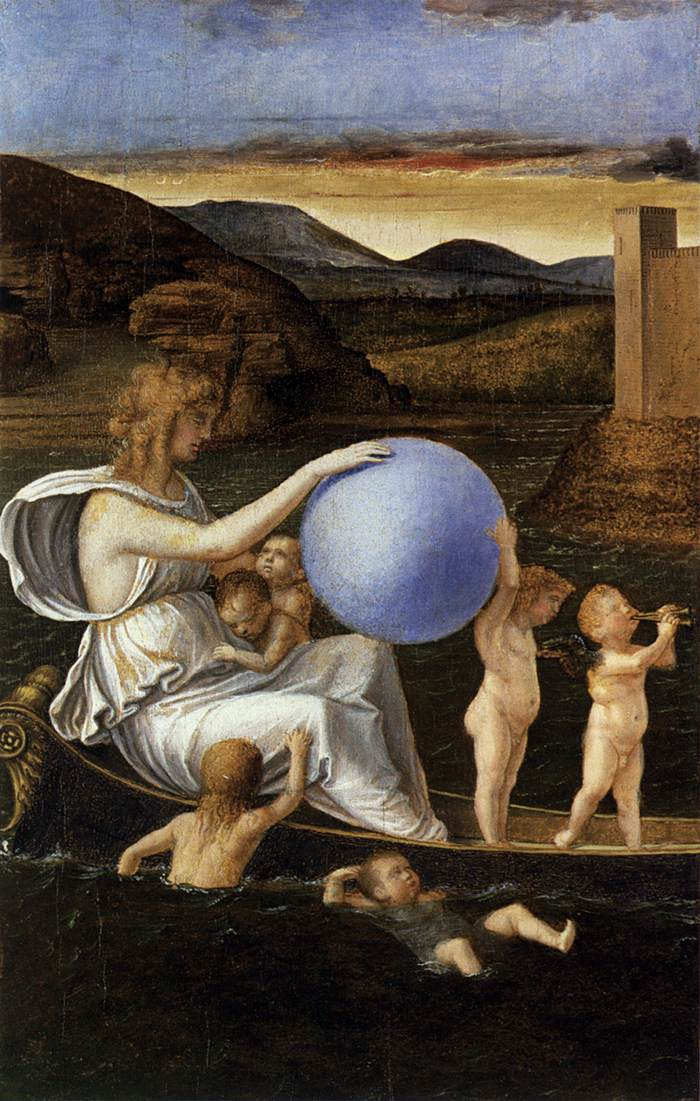
The Fortune

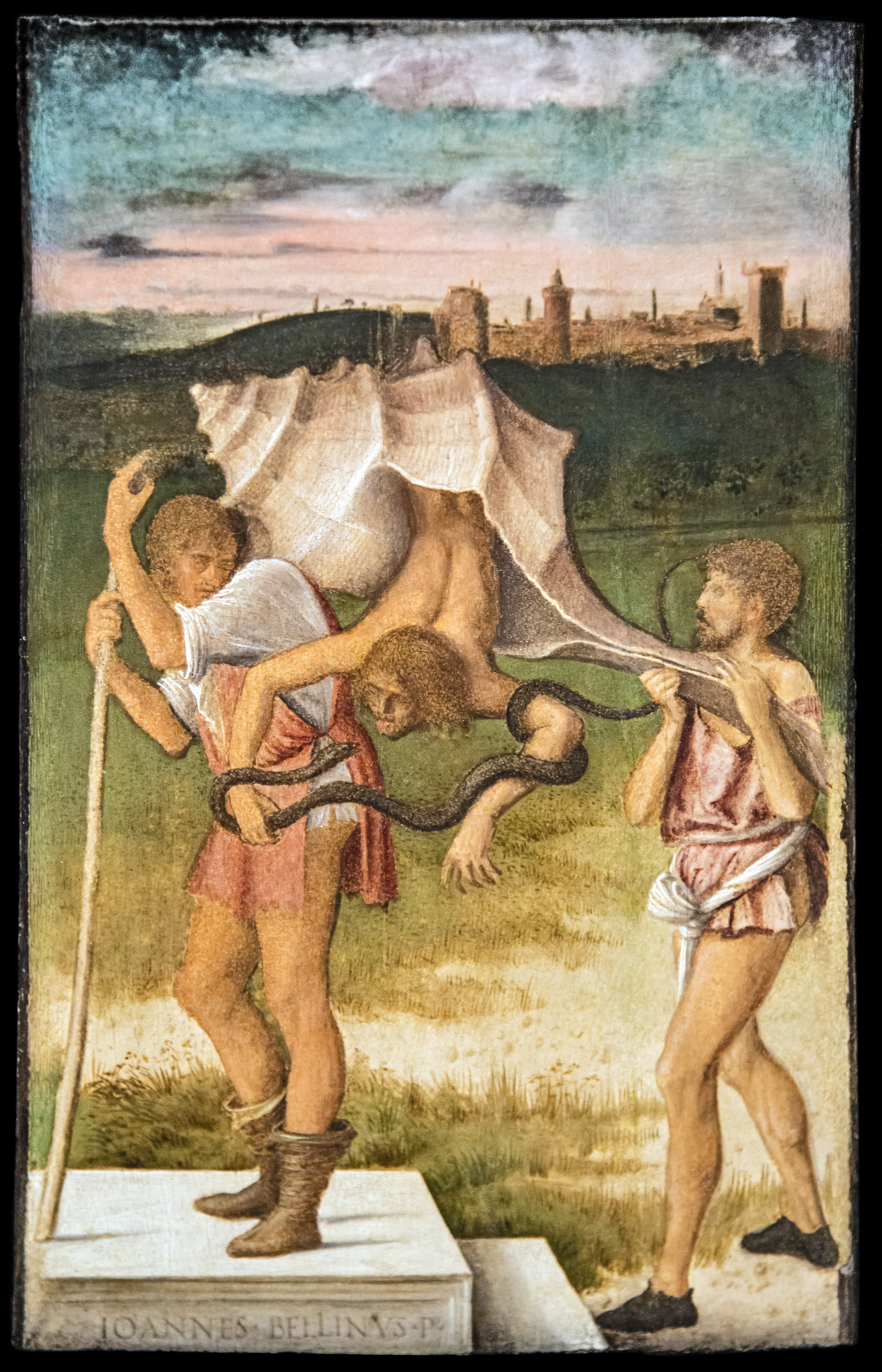
The Falsehood

The Four Allegories is a series of four small panel paintings in the Gallerie dell'Accademia, Venice, Italy by the Italian Renaissance master Giovanni Bellini, whose date has been variously argued as different points in the range 1485–1490. They all measure 34 (Perseverance) or 32 × 22 cm in size.

== History ==
Originally, the four panels probably decorated a small bathroom cabinet in walnut wood, provided with a mirror and rack, owned by the painter Vincenzo Catena. In his will, he left the cabinet to Antonio Marsili. At the time, these cabinets were rather widespread, and a decree issued by the Venetian Senate in 1489 had attempted to limit their construction. They were often decorated by symbolic figures with moral symbolism.

== Description ==
The panels constitute a rare item in Bellini's production, though they have been usually compared to his Holy Allegory in the Uffizi, and the Accademia has another such panel by Bellini or possibly Andrea Previtali, an allegory of Fortune (27 × 19 cm) from a different origin.

Perseverance shows a virtuous warrior to whom Bacchus is offering fruit from a wagon pulled by puttoes. It has been described also as an allegory of lust. The Fortune, or Inconstancy, shows a woman on an unstable boat, surrounded by puttoes, holding a sphere. The Prudence depicts a naked woman pointing out a mirror; it has been differently interpreted as Vanity also.

Falsehood shows a man (different from the usual representation as a woman) exiting a shell, symbol of crookedness of lies. Armed with a snake (symbol of calumny), he is assailing what resembles a hermit, who is setting for the wisdom path from a pedestal, where is also the artist's signature. This figure has been also interpreted as the Virtus Sapientia ("virtue of the wisdom"), the shell being a positive symbol of generation.

== See also ==
- List of works by Giovanni Bellini

== Sources ==
- Olivari, Mariolina (2007). "Giovanni Bellini". Pittori del Rinascimento. Florence: Scala. 888117099X.
- Nepi Sciré, Giovanna & Valcanover, Francesco, Accademia Galleries of Venice, Electa, Milan, 1985, ISBN 88-435-1930-1
