= Sacred Conversation (Cima, Milan) =

Painting by Cima da Conegliano

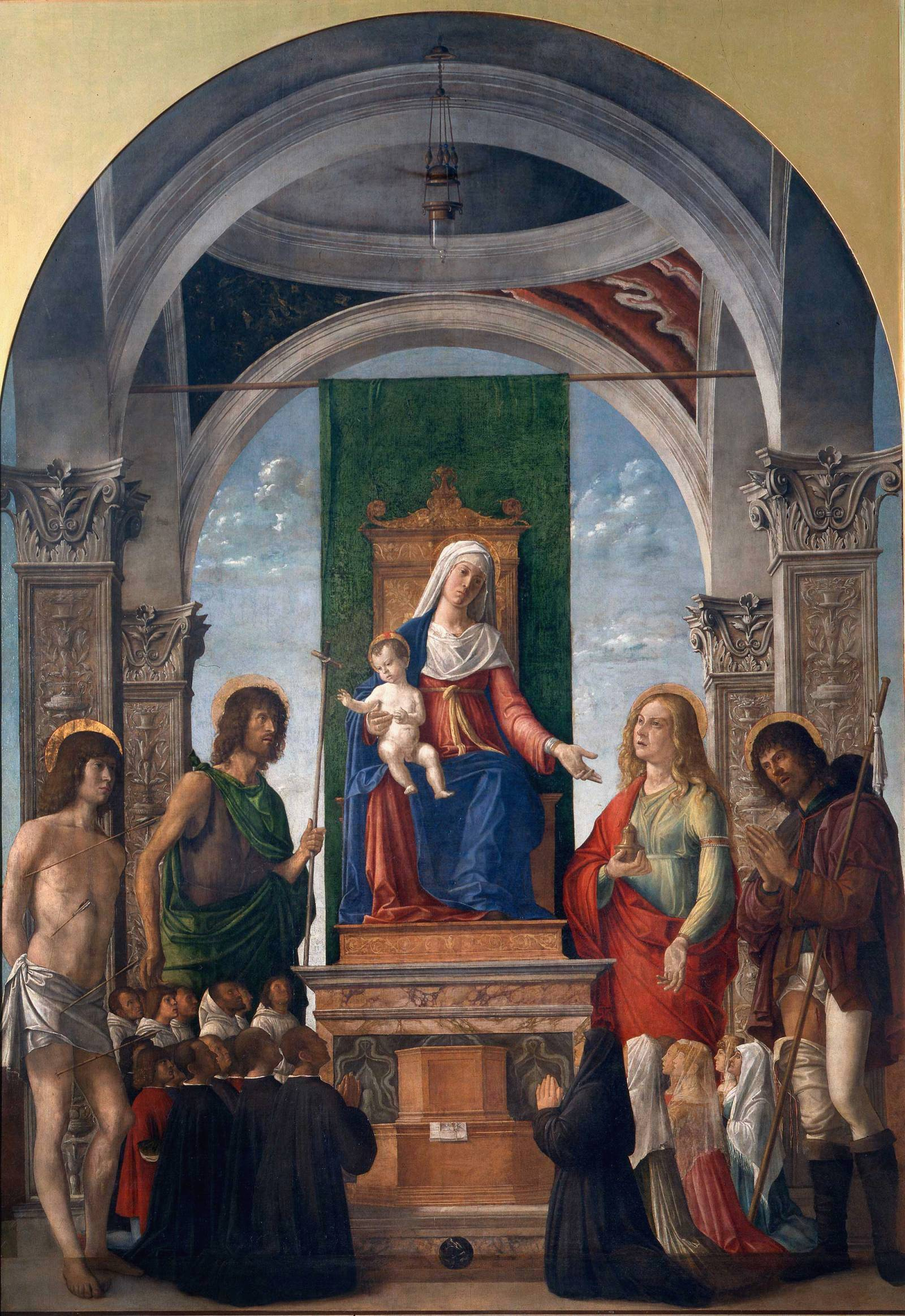
Sacred Conversation (1490) by Cima da Conegliano

The Sacred Conversation or Madonna and Child Enthroned with praying brothers and devotees, Saint Sebastian, Saint John the Baptist, Saint Mary Magdalene and Saint Roch is a 1490 oil-on-panel painting by the Italian artist Cima da Conegliano, now in the Pinacoteca di Brera in Milan.
