= Dragan Altarpiece =

Painting by Cima da Conegliano

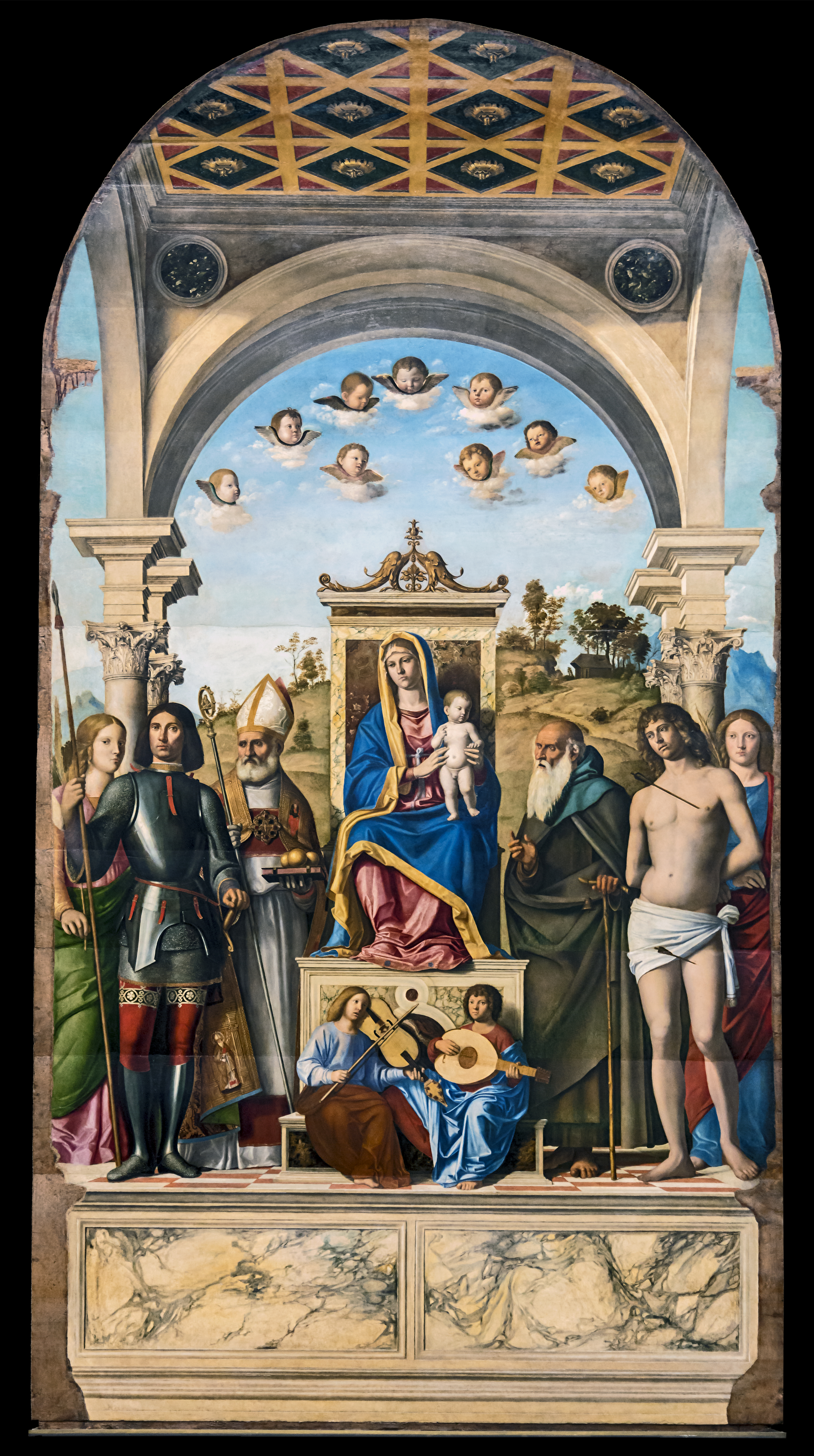
Madonna and Child Enthroned with Saints (1496–1498) by Cima da Conegliano

Madonna and Child Enthroned with Saints is a 1496–1498 oil painting by Cima da Conegliano, originally painted on panel but later transferred to canvas. It is also known as the Dragan Altarpiece after Giorgio Dragan, a shipowner who commissioned it for his personal altar in the church of Santa Maria della Carità in Venice. To the left of the throne is a female saint (possibly Catherine of Alexandria), George and Nicholas, whilst to the right are Anthony Abbot, Sebastian and another female saint (probably Lucy).

It was acquired by the state in 1812 when that church was suppressed and converted into the main section of the Gallerie dell'Accademia, in Venice, where it still hangs.
