= Seated Bishop =

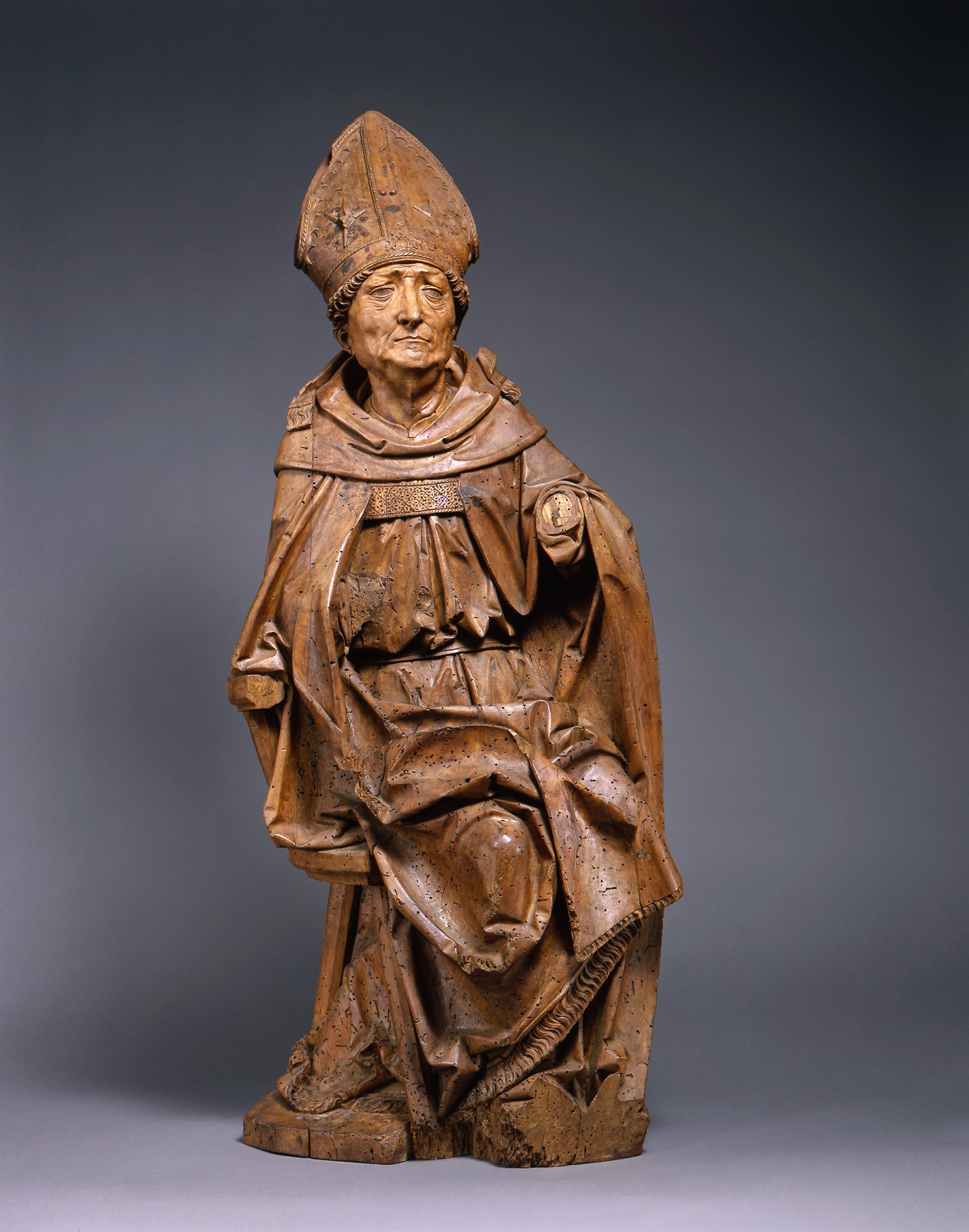
Seated Bishop

Seated Bishop is a lindenwood statue carved by Tilman Riemenschneider. Completed in 1495 during the transition period between late Gothic and Renaissance, it currently resides in the Metropolitan Museum of Art as part of the Cloisters Collection.

Keeping in the lindenwood sculpting tradition of the time, the statue was not painted, only a few details were stained in black for emphasis.
