= 1502 in art =

Events from the year 1502 in art.

== Events ==
- The Worshipful Company of Painter-Stainers is formed by merger as a Livery Company of the City of London.

== Works ==
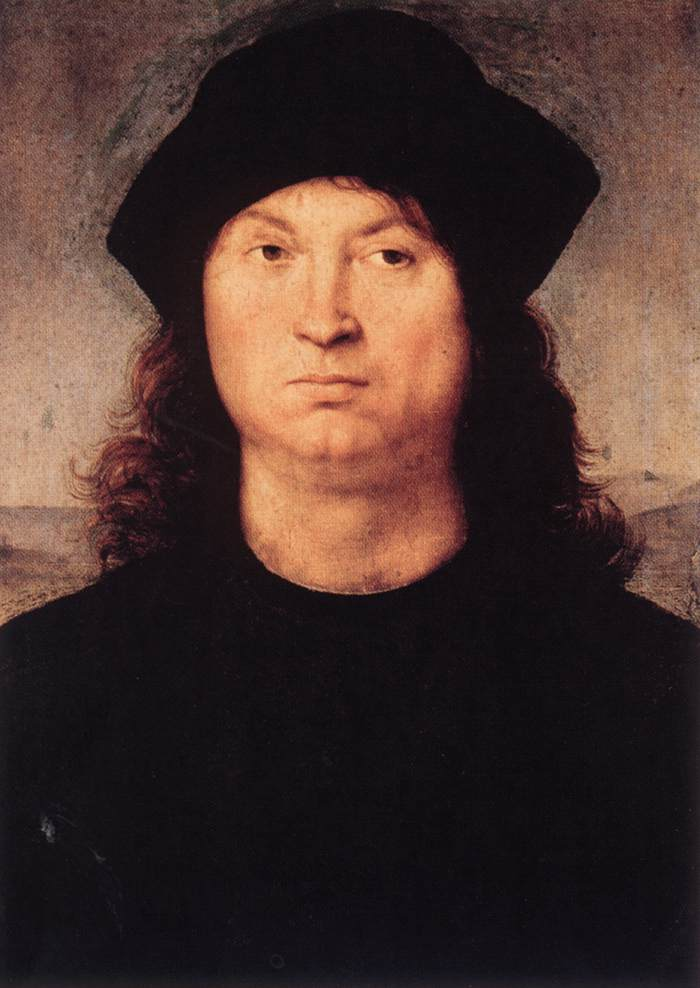
Raphael, Portrait of a Man

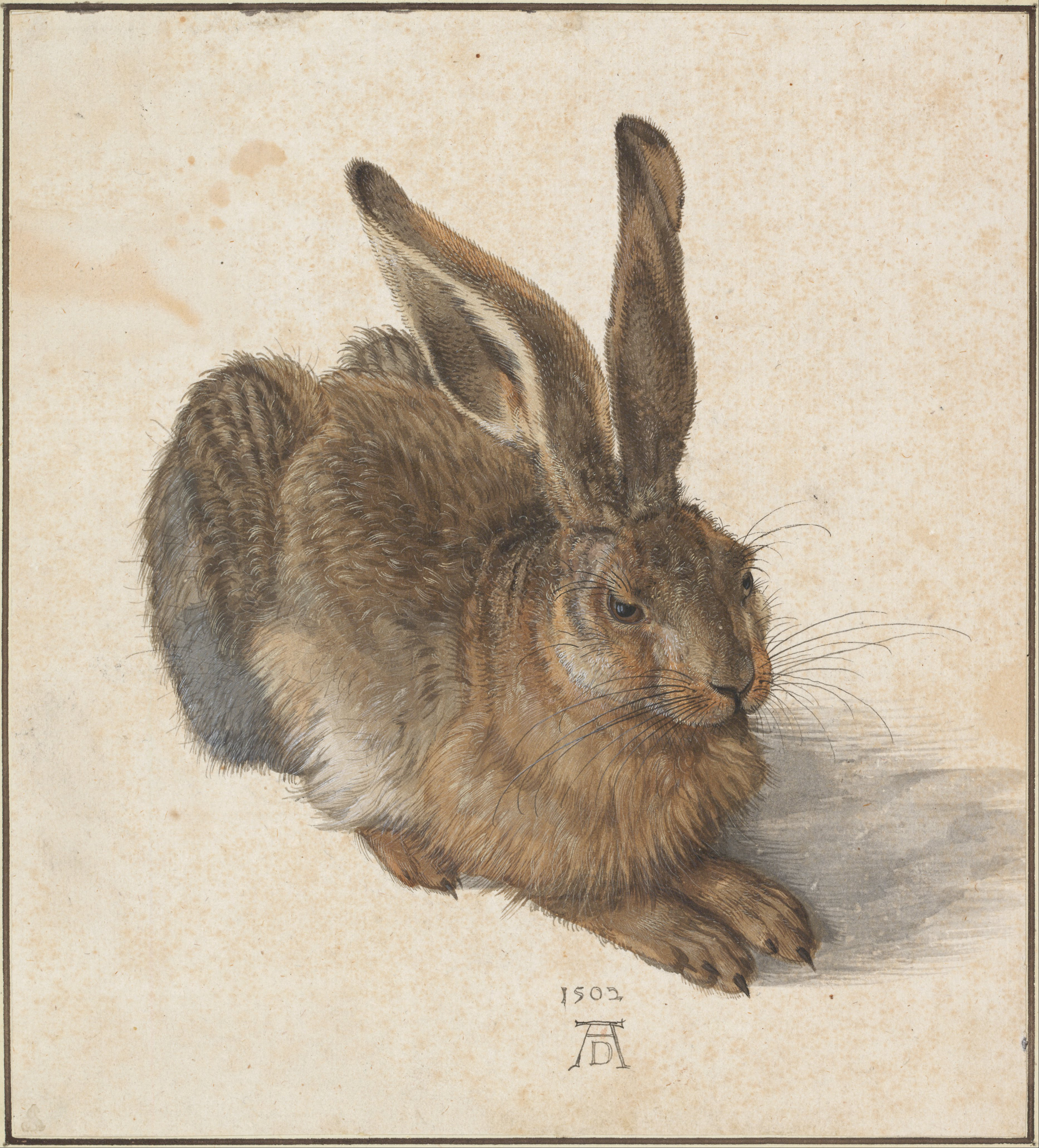
Dürer, Young Hare
- Vittore Carpaccio – St. Augustine in His Study
- Albrecht Dürer – Young Hare
- Andrea Mantegna – Triumph of the Virtues
- Raphael – Portrait of a Man
- Michael Sittow – "Vienna" portrait, probably of Catherine of Aragon (c.1502-4)

== Births ==
- August 14 – Pieter Coecke van Aelst, Flemish artist of paintings and tapestries (died 1550)
- Heinrich Aldegrever, German painter and engraver (died 1555/1561)
- Barthel Beham, German engraver, miniaturist and painter (died 1540)
- Wen Boren, Chinese landscape painter during the Ming Dynasty (died 1575)
- Luis de Vargas, Spanish painter of the late-Renaissance period (died 1568)
- Pier Francesco Foschi, Italian painter active in Florence in a Mannerist style (died 1567)
- Bartolomeo Veneto, Italian portrait painter (died 1546)

== Deaths ==
- March (probable) – Francesco Laurana, Dalmatian sculptor (born c.1430)
- 1501/1502: Vittorio Crivelli, Italian painter (born 1440)
- 1502/1503: Giovanni Donato da Montorfano, Italian painter (born 1460)
