= Francesco Signorelli =

Italian painter

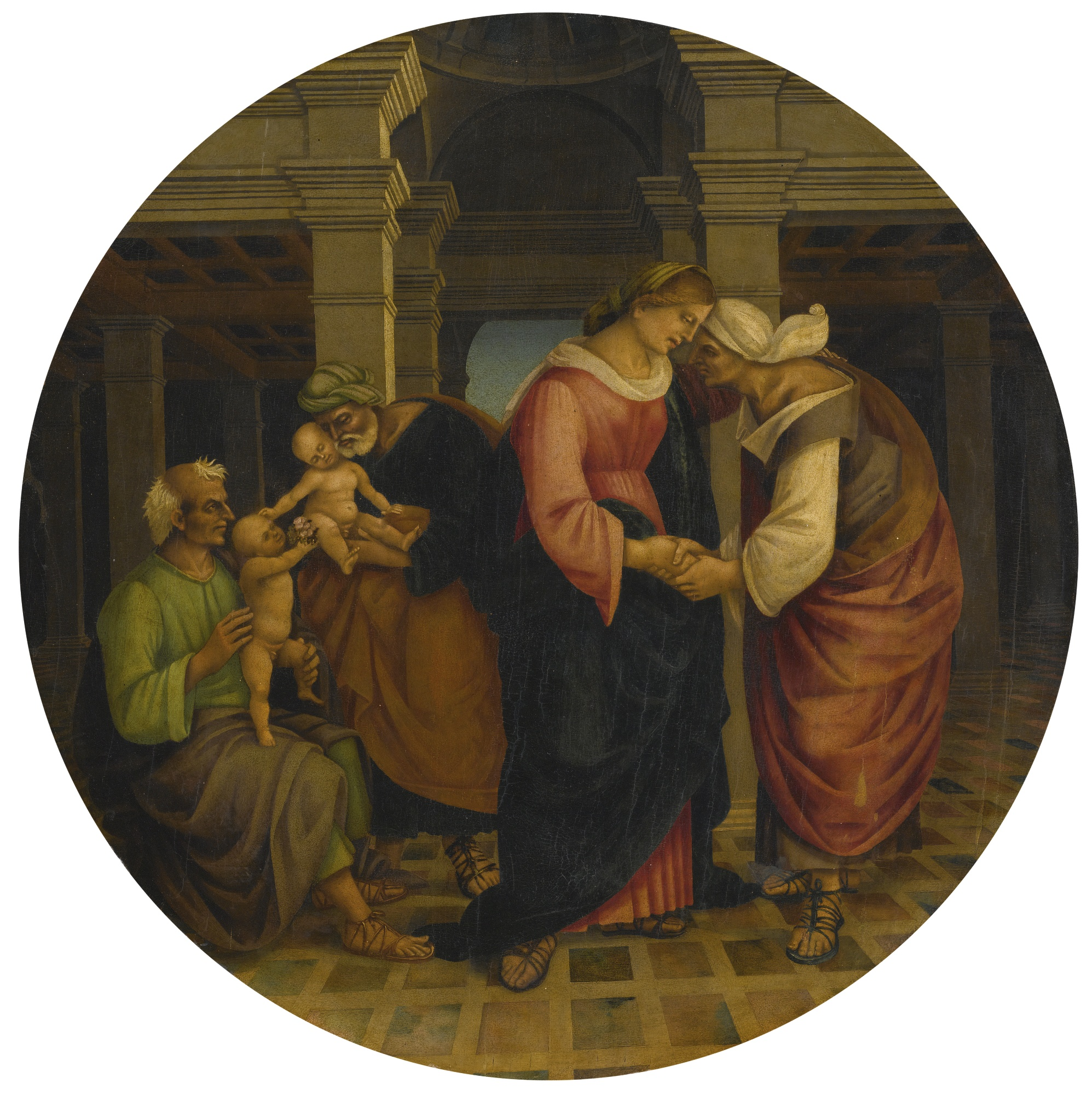
Holy Family with Saints John, Elisabeth, and Zacharias by Francesco Signorelli, private collection

Francesco Signorelli (c.1495–1553) was a 16th-century Italian Renaissance painter.

He was nephew and artistic heir to his uncle Luca Signorelli. Not much is known about Signorelli's life except through his works. He was born, and lived and worked his whole life in and around Cortona. He primarily painted religious-themed paintings for church commissions. One work executed by Francesco Signorelli Madonna and Child is part of the National Museums Liverpool collection.
