= Diego de Arroyo =

Spanish miniature painter

Diego de Arroyo (1498–1551), a Spanish miniature painter born at Toledo, is supposed to have studied either in Italy or under an Italian master. His delicate miniature portraits gained him much renown, and the appointment of painter to Charles V. He also illuminated choir-books for the cathedral of Toledo. Arroyo died at Madrid in 1551.
