= Antonio Labacco =

XVI century italian architect, ritualist, literary theorist

Antonio Labacco was a 16th-century architect, engraver, and writer about the architecture of classical Rome. His name is also given variously as Antonio Labacco, Antonio dall' Abacco, Antonio da Labacco, Antonio Abaco', Antonio l'Abco, or Antonio Abacco.

== Life ==
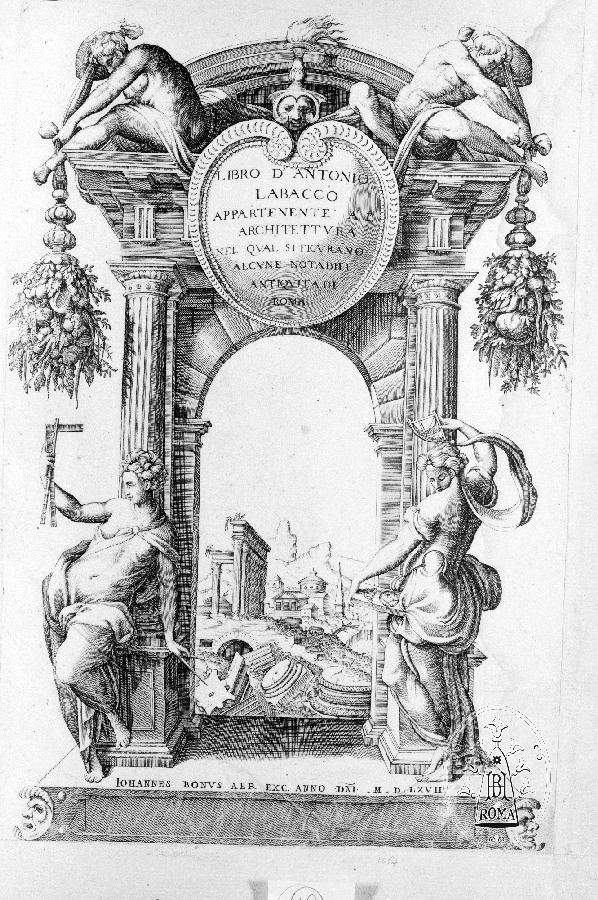
Title page of Labacco's Libro appartenente a l'architettura.

Labacco was born near Vigevano in about 1495. He was a pupil of Antonio da Sangallo the Younger in Rome.

In 1558 he published an architectural treatise, entitled Libro d'Antonio Labacco appartenente a l'architettura nel qual si figurarano alcune notabili antiquita di Roma, with plates he had engraved himself. He also engraved the plans of the Basilica of St. Peter's from Sangallo's designs He died some time after 1567.
