= 1543 in art =

Events from the year 1543 in art.

== Works ==
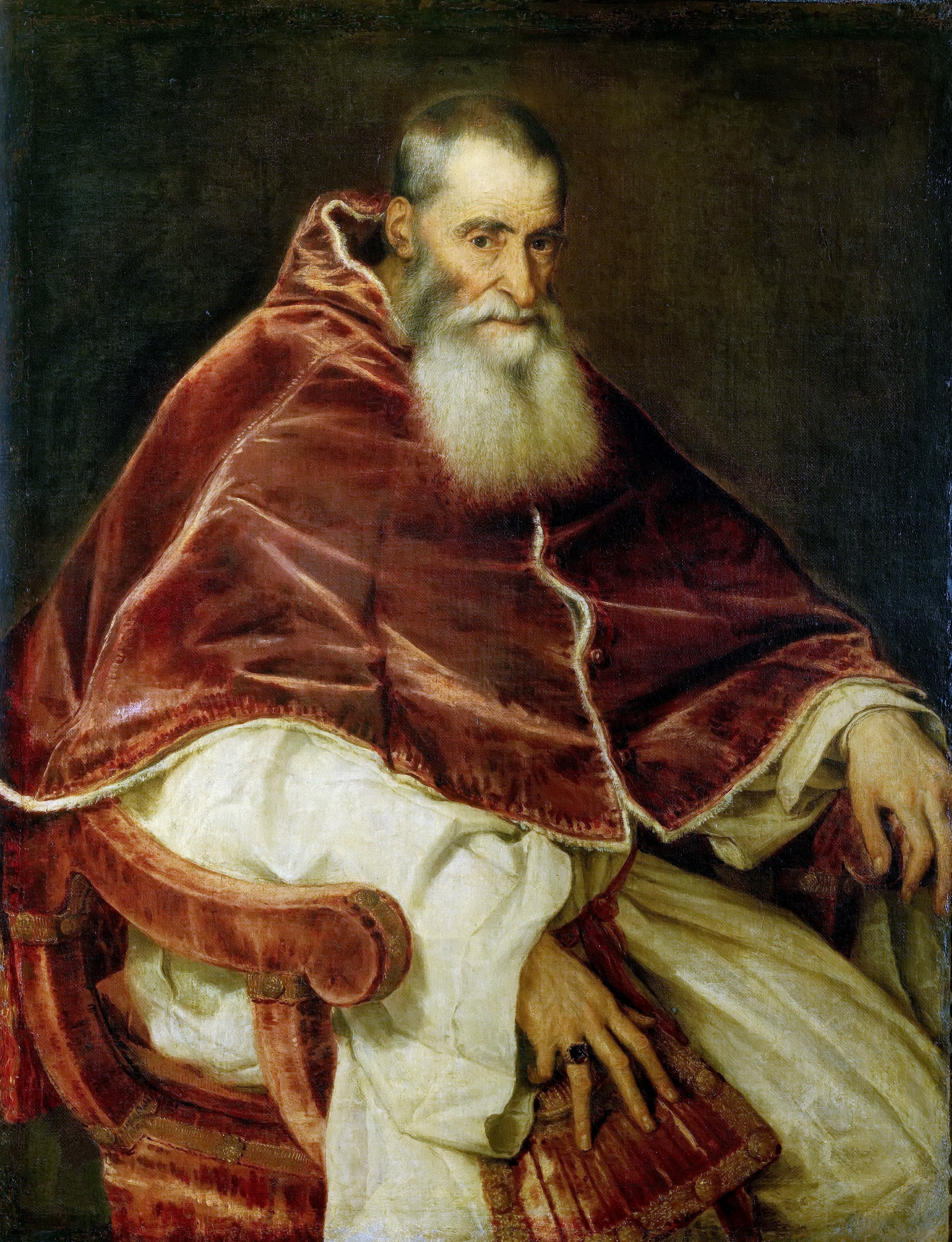
Titian, Portrait of Pope Paul III without a Cap
- Benvenuto Cellini sculpts the Cellini Salt Cellar for Francis I of France

=== Paintings ===
- Hans Holbein the Younger – Portrait of John Chambers
- Lucas Horenbout – Portrait miniature of Hans Holbein the Younger
- Lorenzo Lotto – Husband and Wife
- Master IW - The murder of St. Wenceslas at St Vitus Cathedral, Prague
- Titian - Ecce Homo

== Births ==
- February 16 - Kanō Eitoku, Japanese painter of the Azuchi-Momoyama period, patriarchs of the Kanō school of Japanese painting (died 1590)
- date unknown
  - Alessandro Fei, Italian painter who primarily worked in a Mannerist style (died 1592)
  - Quentin Metsys the Younger, Flemish painter at the court of Queen Elizabeth I of England (died 1589)
- probable - François Quesnel, French painter of Scottish extraction (died 1619)

== Deaths ==
- October/November - Hans Holbein the Younger, German artist and printmaker who worked in a Northern Renaissance style (born 1497)
- November 30 - Francesco Granacci, Italian painter (born 1469)
- date unknown
  - Polidoro da Caravaggio, Italian painter (born 1492/1495)
  - Altobello Melone, Italian painter (born 1490/1491)
