= 1541 in art =

Events from the year 1541 in art.

== Events ==
- Michelangelo completes his fresco The Last Judgment on the altar wall of the Sistine Chapel in Vatican City.
- Cardinal Alexander writes to Bishop Marco Vigerio discussing frescoes to be done by Michelangelo for the Cappella Paolina.

== Works ==
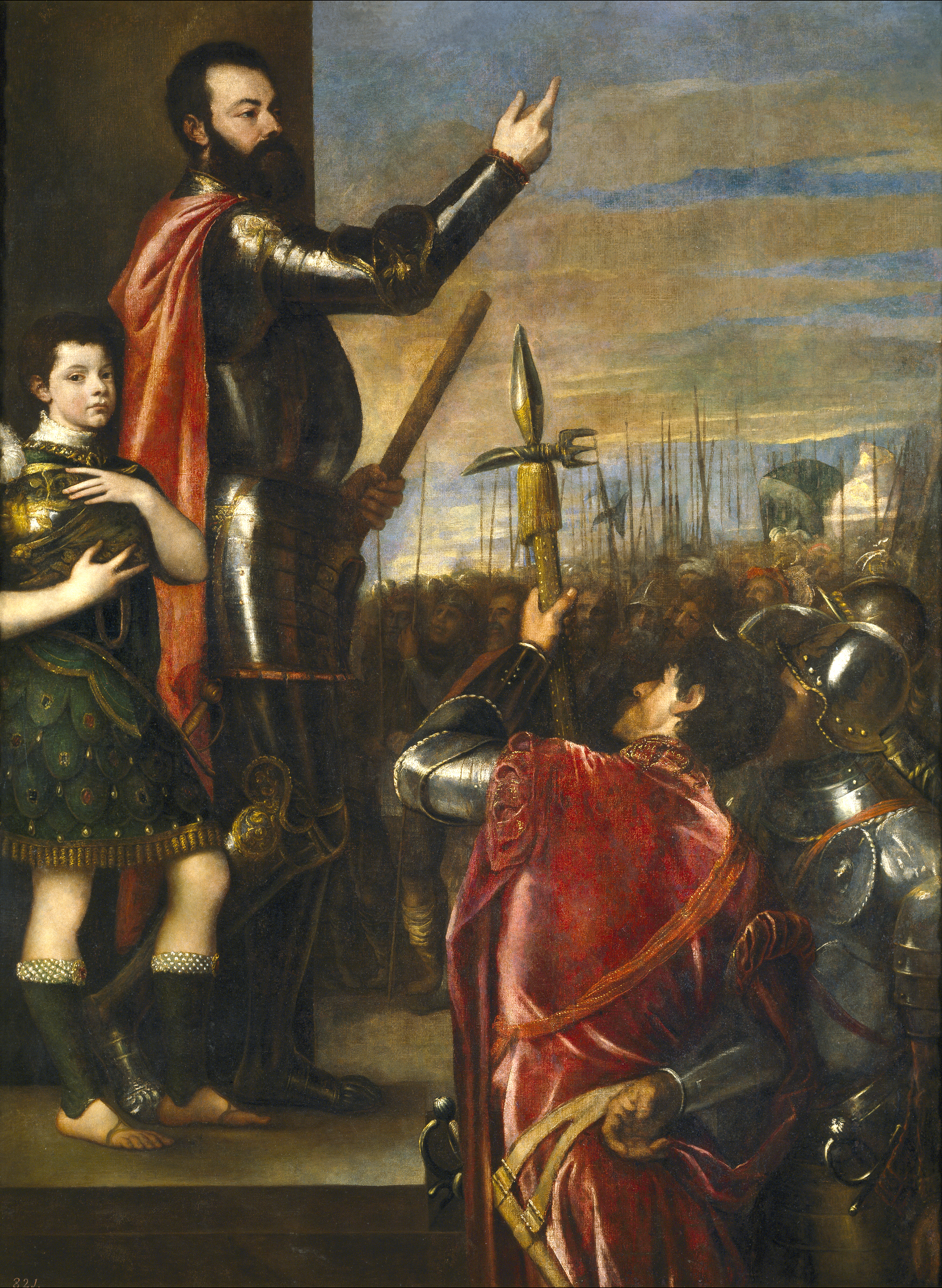
Titian – The Marquis of Vasto addressing his troops, Museo del Prado

- Battista Franco Veneziano paints fresco of the Arrest of John the Baptist for the Oratory of San Giovanni Decollato
- Pietro Negroni paints Adoration of Magi
- Titian – The Marquis of Vasto addressing his troops
- Antoine Caron – Dionysius Areopagite and the Eclipse of Sun^{(image)}

== Births ==
date unknown

- El Greco (or Domenikos Theotokopoulos), painter, sculptor, and architect of the Spanish Renaissance (died 1614)
- Aert Mijtens, Flemish Renaissance painter (died 1602)
- Yi Chong, Korean painter (died 1622)

== Deaths ==
- January 6 - Bernard van Orley, Flemish Northern Renaissance painter and draughtsman (born 1487-1491)
- August - Valentin Bousch, glass painter (born 1490)
- date unknown
  - Jean Clouet, miniaturist and painter who worked in France during the Renaissance (born 1480)
  - Gerard Horenbout, Flemish miniaturist (born 1465)
  - Stanisław Samostrzelnik, Polish Renaissance painter and Cistercian monk (born 1490)
