= 1553 in art =

Events from the year 1553 in art.

== Events ==
- Maarten van Heemskerck becomes curate of St. Bavochurch, where he serves 22 years
- After Bonifazio Veronese dies, Palma il Giovane takes over his workshop and clientele

== Paintings ==
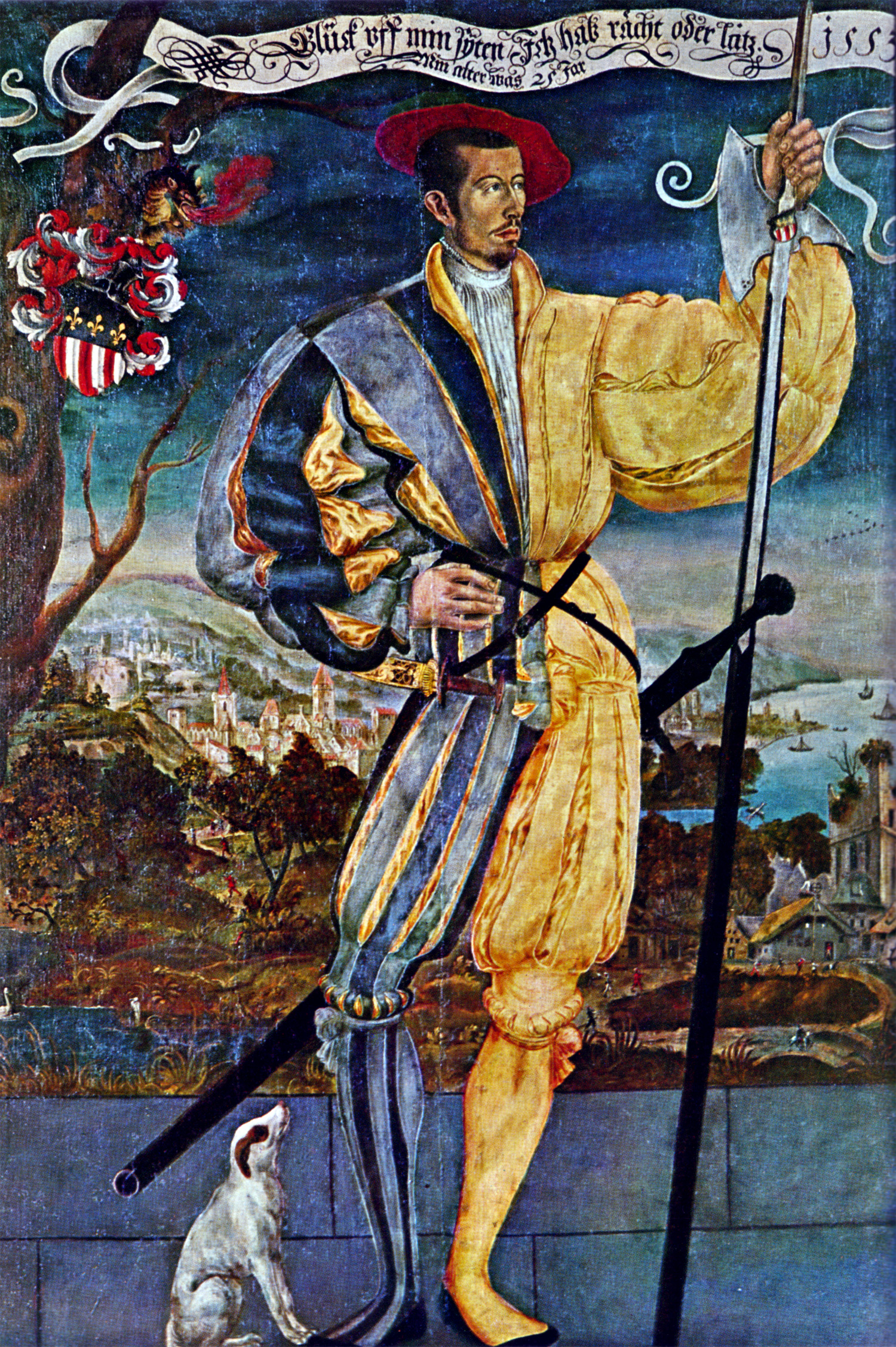
Manuel – Portrait of Niklaus Manuel as a Swiss mercenary, by his brother Hans Rudolf, Historical Museum of Bern

- Giovanni Battista Moroni - Portrait of a Man
- Titian - Venus and Adonis
- Paolo Veronese - Temptation of St Anthony (altarpiece created for Mantua Cathedral taken from Italy by Napoleon now in Caen, France - begun in 1552, completed in 1553)

== Births ==
- date unknown
  - Cherubino Alberti or Borghegiano, Italian engraver and painter (died 1615)
  - Jerónimo de Ayanz y Beaumont, Spanish soldier, painter, musician and inventor (died 1613)
  - Juan Pantoja de la Cruz, Spanish painter (died 1608)
  - Niccolò Granello, Italian fresco painter established in Spain (died 1593)
  - Hieronymus Wierix, Flemish engraver (died 1619)

== Deaths ==
- February - Augustin Hirschvogel, German artist, mathematician, and cartographer known primarily for his etchings (born 1503)
- May 22 - Giovanni Bernardi, Italian gem engraver and medalist (born 1494)
- June 3 - Wolf Huber, Austrian painter, printmaker, and architect, a leading member of the Danube School (born 1485)
- October 16 - Lucas Cranach the Elder, German painter and printmaker in woodcut and engraving (born 1472)
- October 19 - Bonifazio Veronese, Italian Mannerist painter from Venice (born 1487)
- date unknown
  - Giorgio Andreoli, Italian potter of the Italian Renaissance, inventor of a particular kind of lusterware (lustro) (born 1465/1470)
  - Cornelis Anthonisz., Dutch painter, engraver and mapmaker (born 1505)
  - Adriaen Pietersz Crabeth, Dutch glass painter (born 1510)
  - Francesco Signorelli - Italian Renaissance painter (born 1495)
- probable - Domenico Alfani, Italian painter (born 1480)
