= 1549 in art =

Events from the year 1549 in art.

== Events ==
- Sculptor Hans Vischer, the last of the Vischer Family of Nuremberg, leaves the city.

== Works ==
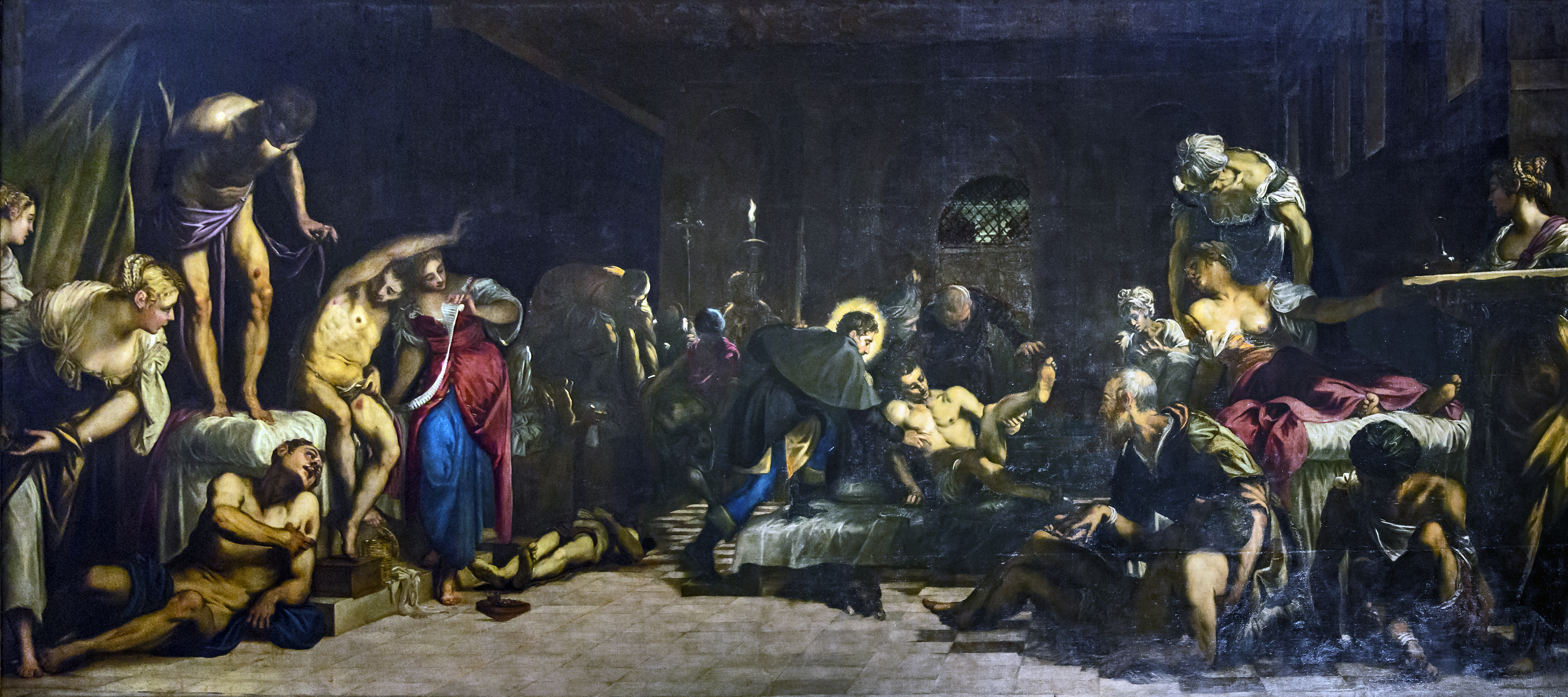
Tintoretto – St. Roch in the Hospital, San Rocco, Venice

- Bartolommeo Bandinelli - God the Father (statue), in the cloister of Santa Croce, Florence
- Bronzino – Portrait of Giovanni de' Medici
- Tintoretto – St. Roch in the Hospital

== Births ==
- July 5 - Francesco Maria del Monte, Italian Cardinal and arts patron (Caravaggio) (died 1627)
- September 1 - Cesare Aretusi, Italian painter (died 1612)
- date unknown - Giovanni Contarini, Venetian painter (died 1605)
- probable (born 1549/1551) - Giovanni Ambrogio Figino, Italian painter (died 1608)

== Deaths ==
- February 14 - Il Sodoma, Italian Mannerist painter (born 1477)
- March - Aelbrecht Bouts, Dutch painter
- date unknown - Jean Juste, Italian sculptor (born 1485)
