= 1470s in art =

- 1460s
- 1470s in art
- 1480s
Other topics in 1470s:
- Music

Art timeline

The decade of the 1470s in art involved some significant events.

== Events ==
- 1470 - Francesco del Cossa leaves Ferrara for Bologna.
- 1473 - Hanseatic privateer Paul Beneke, captain of the Peter von Danzig, boards the galley St. Thomas in the North Sea; among the goods seized is Hans Memling's triptych The Last Judgment.
- 1479 - September: Painter Gentile Bellini is sent by the Senate of Venice to the new Ottoman capital Constantinople as a cultural ambassador.

== Sculpture ==
- 1473-1475: Andrea del Verrocchio models David (bronze)
- 1474: Neroccio di Bartolomeo de' Landi creates his wooden statue of a youthful Saint Catherine of Siena that is set in her Sanctuary in Siena
- 1475: alabaster cadaver monument of Alice de la Pole, Duchess of Suffolk, installed in Ewelme church in Oxfordshire (England)

== Paintings ==
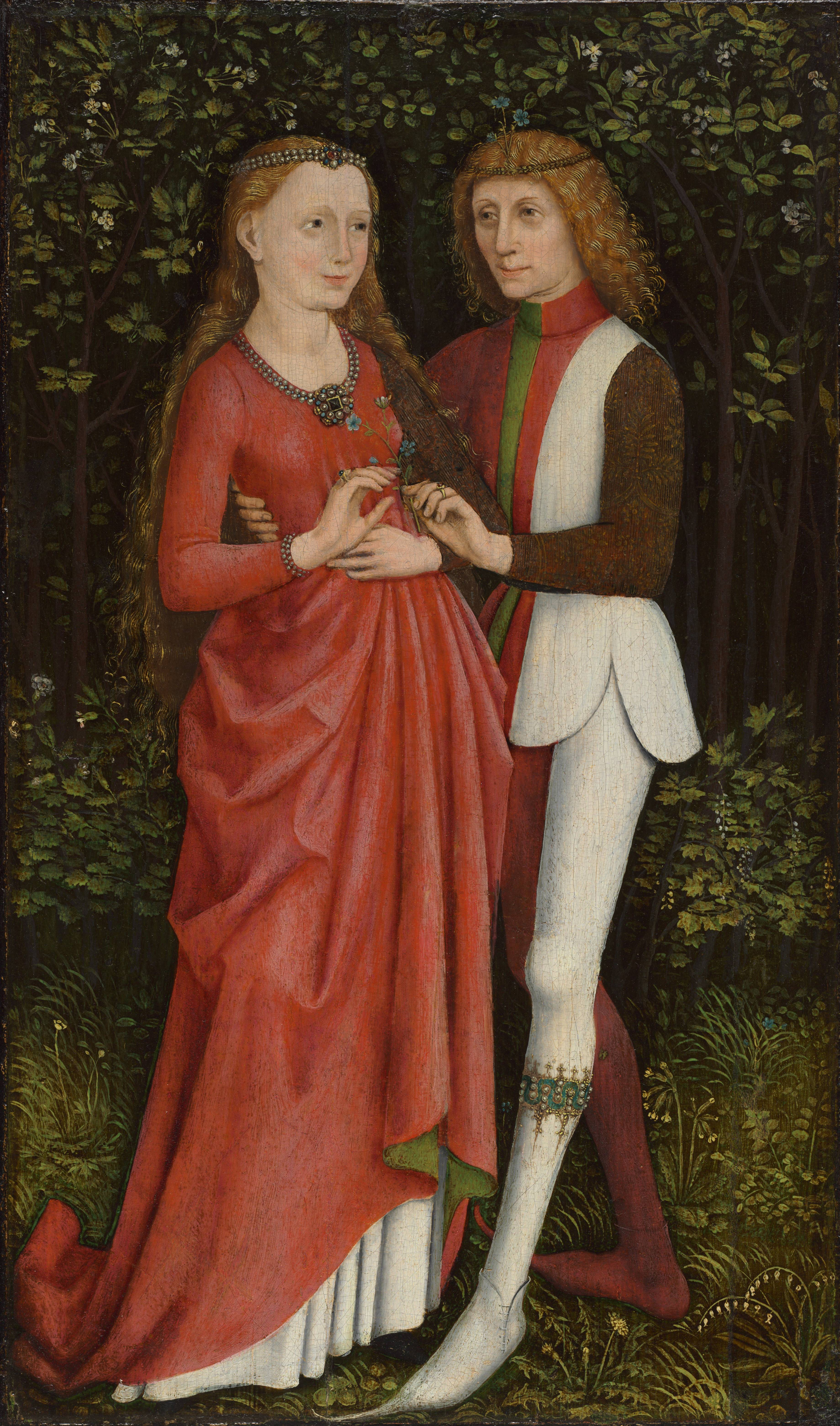
A Bridal Couple (1470) by the Schwäbischer Meister in 1470

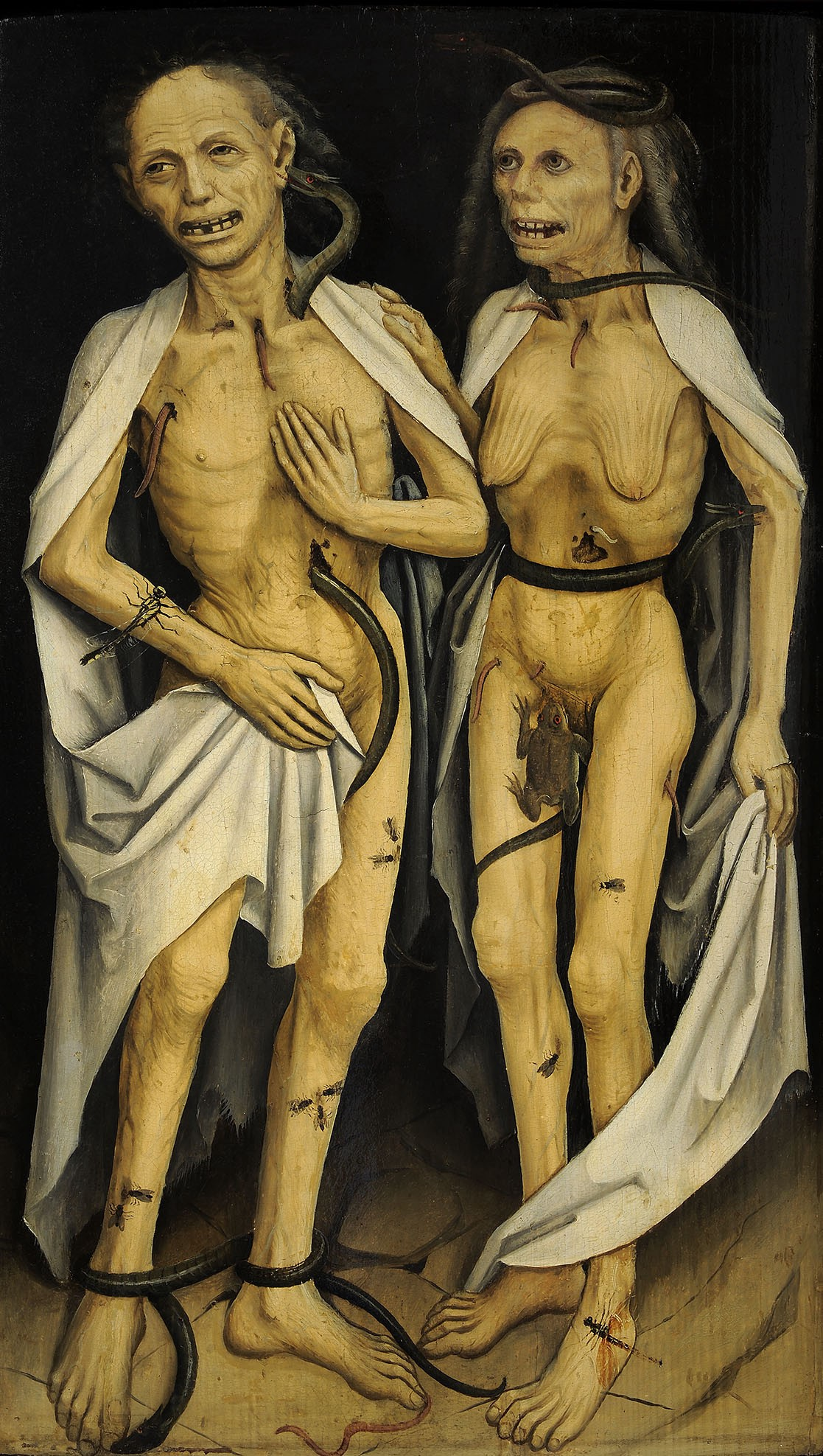
The Dead Lovers Unknown artist, Upper Rhineland, ca. 1470

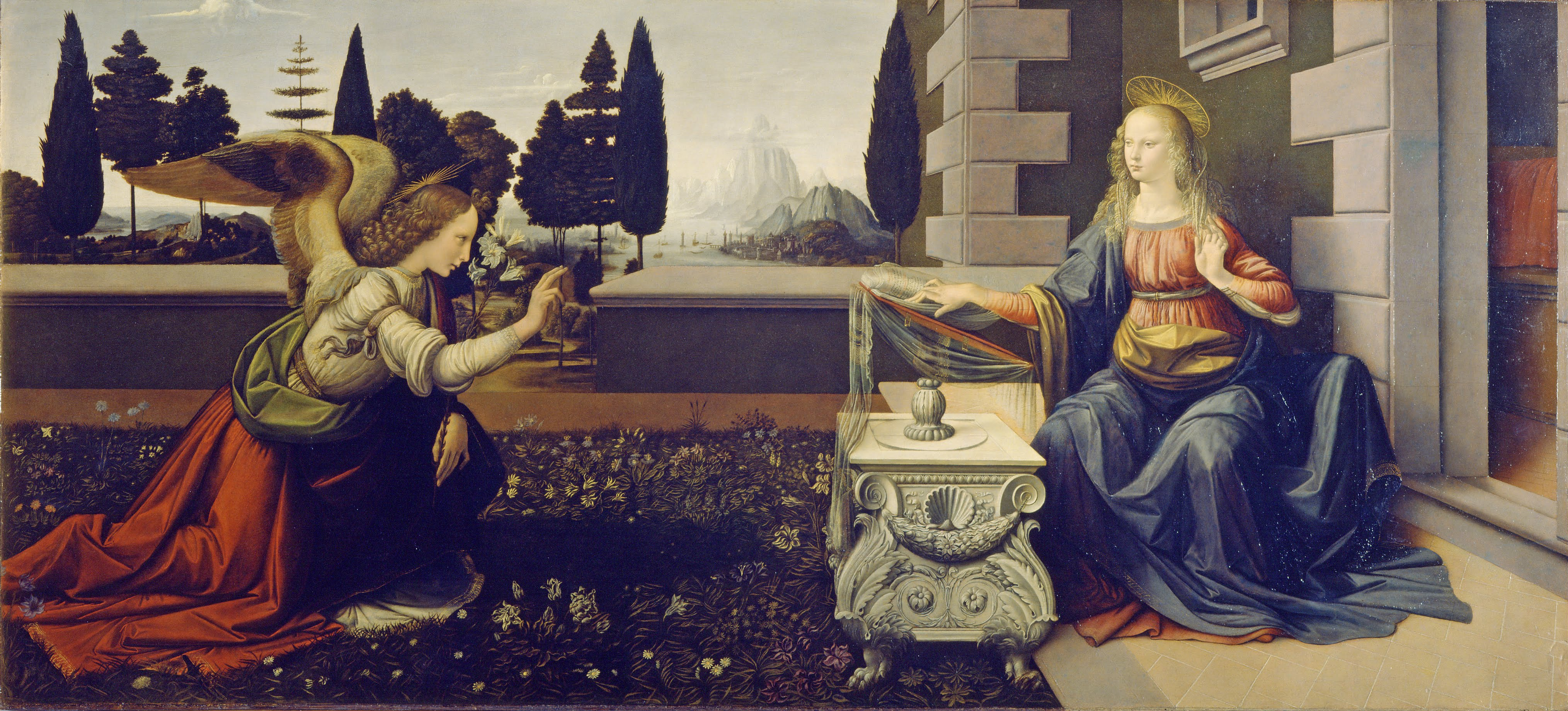
Leonardo da Vinci, Annunciation (1475–1480), Uffizi, thought to be Leonardo's earliest complete work

- 1470
  - Carlo Crivelli paints the altarpiece (1470–71) for the church of San Francesco in Gualdo Tadino, on the border of Umbria, near Fabriano, Italy
  - Cosimo Rosselli paints Madonna and Child
  - Cosmè Tura paints St. Jerome
- c.1470: Hans Memling paints St. John the Baptist, Adoration of the Magi and Scenes from the Passion of Christ
- c.1470-2
  - Francesco del Cossa paints an Annunciation and Nativity series
  - Hans Memling paints the Portrait of Maria Portinari
- c.1470-5: Piero del Pollaiuolo paints Portrait of a Young Woman
- By 1471: Hans Memling completes painting The Last Judgment
- 1472
  - Carlo Crivelli paints the 1472 Altarpiece
  - Hans Memling paints the portrait of Gilles Joye
- 1473:
  - Francesco del Cossa paints the Griffoni Polyptych
  - Martin Schongauer paints the Madonna of the Rose Bower
- 1474: Ercole de' Roberti paints St. Jerome in the Wilderness
- 1474-5: Andrea del Verrocchio assisted by Leonardo da Vinci paints The Baptism of Christ
- c.1474-8: Leonardo da Vinci paints Ginevra de' Benci
- c.1475-80: Hans Memling paints the Donne Triptych

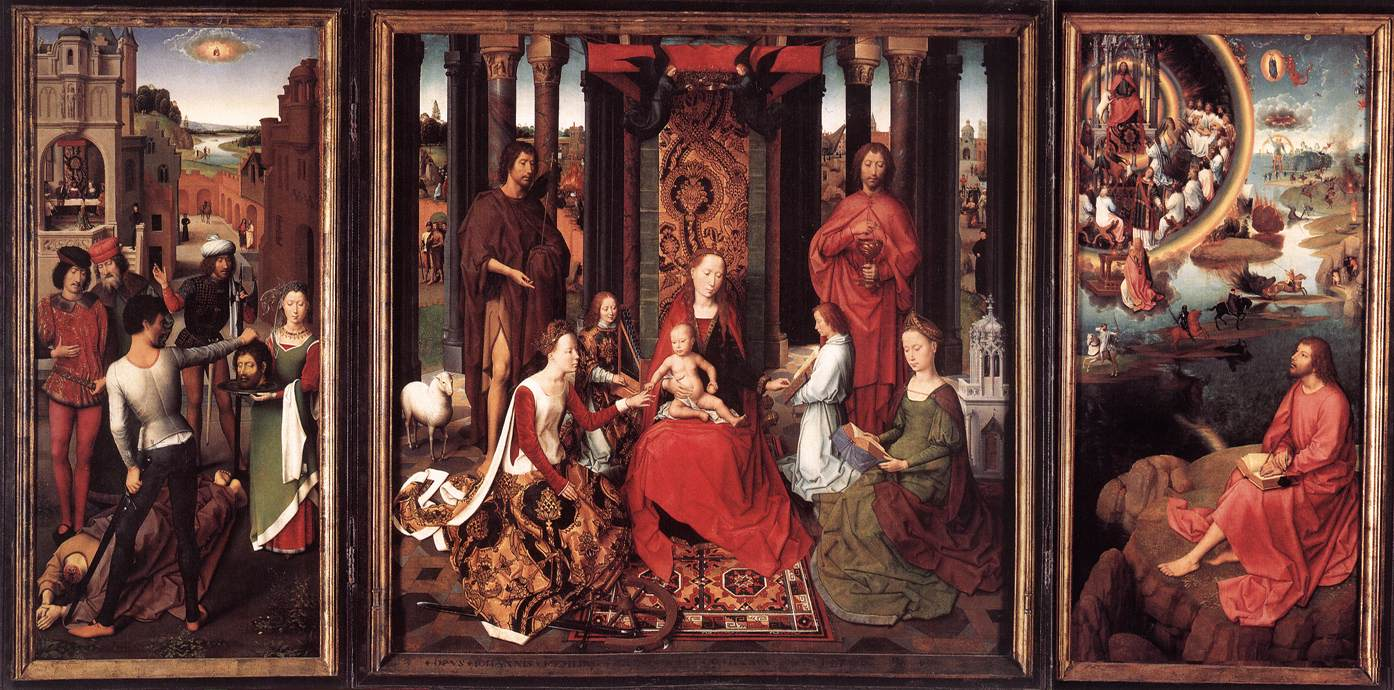
Hans Memling St John Altarpiece (completed c.1479), Bruges

- 1475
  - Leonardo da Vinci paints The Annunciation
  - Andrea Mantegna completes a decade's work on the frescoes in the Camera degli Sposi in the Ducal palace, Mantua, Lombardy
  - Hans Memling paints Portrait of a Man with a Pink Carnation
- c.1475
  - Antonello da Messina paints Portrait of a Man
  - Piero del Pollaiuolo completes painting Martyrdom of Saint Sebastian for the Pucci Chapel of Santissima Annunziata, Florence and his brother Antonio paints Hercules and the Hydra and (probably during this decade) Apollo and Daphne
  - Hans Memling paints the Diptych of Jean de Cellier (Louvre)
- 1476: Joseph ibn Hayyim completes illumination of the "Kennicott" Hebrew Bible
- c.1476-8: Andrea del Verrocchio assisted by Lorenzo di Credi paints The Virgin and Child with Two Angels
- 1478
  - Leonardo da Vinci paints either The Benois Madonna or the Madonna with the Carnation
  - Hans Memling paints Christ Giving His Blessing
- c.1478: Domenico Ghirlandaio paints Portrait of a Man and frescoes in Santa Fina Chapel of Collegiate Church of San Gimignano in Tuscany
- c.1479: Hans Memling completes painting the St John Altarpiece for Old St. John's Hospital in Bruges and, at about the same time, the Donne Triptych
- c.1479-80: Hans Memling paints Allegory with a Virgin

== Births ==
- 1470: Marco Bello – Italian painter, pupil of Giovanni Bellini (died 1523)
- 1470: Ambrogio Bergognone – Italian Renaissance painter of the Milanese school (died 1523/1524)
- 1470: Marco Basaiti - Venetian Greek painter and a rival of Giovanni Bellini (died 1530)
- 1470: Valerio Belli – Italian engraver and medallion maker (died 1546)
- 1470: Jorge Afonso – Portuguese Renaissance painter (died 1540)
- 1470: Gregor Erhart - German sculptor, son of Michel Erhart (died 1540)
- 1470: Matthias Grünewald – German Renaissance painter of religious works (died 1528)
- 1470: Wen Zhengming – Ming Dynasty painter, calligrapher, and scholar (died 1559)
- 1470: Guillaume de Marcillat - French painter and stained glass artist (died 1529)
- 1470: Girolamo Mocetto - Italian Renaissance painter, engraver, and stained glass designer (died 1530)
- 1470: Girolamo Alibrandi - Italian painter (died 1524)
- 1470: Vincenzo Civerchio – Italian painter of the Renaissance (died 1544)
- 1470: Michele da Verona – Italian painter of the Renaissance period (died 1536)
- 1470: Tang Yin – Chinese scholar, painter of the Ming dynasty (died 1524)
- 1470: Jacob Cornelisz van Oostsanen – Northern Netherlandish designer of woodcuts and painter (died 1533)
- 1470: Girolamo di Benvenuto - Italian painter, son of Benvenuto di Giovanni (died 1525)
- 1470: Juan de Borgoña – High Renaissance painter born in the Duchy of Burgundy (died 1534)
- 1470: Rueland Frueauf the Younger - German Late-Gothic painter (died 1545)
- 1470: Jan van Dornicke, South Netherlandish painter (died 1527)
- 1470: Jacob van Laethem - Flemish painter of the Early Netherlandish painting era (died 1528)
- 1471: Albrecht Dürer – German painter, printmaker and theorist from Nuremberg, Germany (died 1528)
- 1471: Gaudenzio Ferrari – Italian painter and sculptor of the Renaissance (died 1546)
- 1471: Girolamo Marchesi - Italian painter (died 1550)
- 1471: Francesco Morone - Italian painter active mainly in Verona (died 1529)
- 1472: Fra Bartolommeo - Florentine painter (died 1517)
- 1472: Lucas Cranach the Elder – German painter and printmaker in woodcut and engraving (died 1553)
- 1473: Hans Burgkmair – German painter and printmaker in woodcut (died 1531)
- 1474: October 13 – Mariotto Albertinelli, Italian Renaissance painter (died 1515)
- 1474: May 19 - Isabella d'Este, Italian noblewoman (Marchioness of Mantua), art collector, and patroness (died 1539)
- 1474: Giovanni Francesco Rustici – Italian Renaissance painter and sculptor (died 1554)
- 1474: Raffaello Botticini - Italian Renaissance painter (died 1520)
- 1474: Giacomo Pacchiarotti – Italian painter (died 1539/1540)
- 1474/1475: Girolamo dai Libri – Italian illuminator of manuscripts and painter of altarpieces (died 1555)
- 1475: March 6 – Michelangelo - Italian Renaissance painter, sculptor, architect, poet and engineer (died 1564)
- 1475: Albert Cornelis - Flemish Renaissance painter (died 1532)
- 1475: Giuliano Bugiardini - Italian painter (died 1577)
- 1475: Jan de Beer – Italian painter (died 1528)
- 1475: Alejo Fernandez – Spanish painter of the 16th century (died 1545)
- 1475: Giovanni Angelo Del Maino - Italian sculptor in wood (died unknown)
- 1475: Vicente Juan Masip - Spanish painter of the Renaissance period (died 1545)
- 1475: Jan Mostaert – Dutch painter of portraits and religious subjects (died 1555/1556)
- 1475: Vasco Fernandes – Portuguese Renaissance painter (died 1542)
- 1475: Guglielmo da Marsiglia – Italian painter of stained glass (died 1537)
- 1475-80: Martino Piazza - Italian Renaissance painter (died 1523)
- 1476: Kanō Motonobu – Italian painter (died 1559)
- 1476: Girolamo Genga – Italian painter and architect of the late Renaissance (died 1551)
- 1476: Giovanni Battista Caporali, Italian painter (died 1560)
- 1476: Jacopo Torni – Florentine painter (died 1526)
- 1477: Il Sodoma – Italian Mannerist painter (died 1549)
- 1477: Giorgione – Italian painter of the High Renaissance in Venice (died 1510)
- 1477: Girolamo del Pacchia – Italian painter (died 1533)
- 1477: Lü Ji – Chinese painter of primarily bird-and-flower paintings during the Ming Dynasty (d. unknown)
- 1477: Cesare da Sesto – Italian painter active primarily in Milan (died 1523)
- 1478: Jan Mabuse – Flemish painter (died 1532)
- 1478: Antonello Gagini – Italian sculptor of the High Renaissance (died 1536)
- 1478: Martin Schaffner – German painter and medallist (died 1548)
- 1479: Antoine Juste – Italian sculptor (died 1519)
- 1479: Jacob van Utrecht – Flemish early Renaissance painter (died 1525)

== Deaths ==
- 1479: Antonello da Messina – Sicilian painter active during the Italian Renaissance (born 1430)
- 1479: Felice Feliciano - Italian calligrapher, composer of alchemical sonnets, and expert on Roman antiquity (born 1433)
- 1479: Loyset Liédet - early Netherlandish miniaturist and illuminator (born 1420)
- 1479: Zanobi Machiavelli – Italian early Renaissance painter (died 1418)
- 1478: Johannes Mentelin - German calligrapher, book scribe, and printmaker (born 1410)
- 1478/1481: Antonio Rossellino – Italian sculptor (born 1427)
- 1477: Giovanni Antonio Bellinzoni da Pesaro - Italian Renaissance painter (born 1415)
- c. 1477: Francesco del Cossa - Italian Renaissance painter (born c. 1430)
- 1476: Cristoforo di Geremia – Italian medalist (born 1410)
- 1475: Dieric Bouts – Early Netherlandish painter (born 1410/1420)
- 1475: Albert van Ouwater – Early Netherlandish painter working in the Northern Netherlands (born 1410/1415)
- 1475: Maulana Azhar - Persian calligrapher (born unknown)
- 1475: Cristoforo Moretti - painter of the quattrocento who worked in a late International Gothic style (born 1451)
- 1475: March 6 – Paolo Uccello, Italian painter, draughtsman, mosaicist and designer (born 1397)
- 1475/1476: Petrus Christus – Netherlandish painter active in Bruges (born 1410/1420)
- 1474: Du Qiong – Chinese landscape painter, calligrapher, and poet during the Ming Dynasty (born 1396)
- 1474: Giovanni da Oriolo - Italian painter of the Quattrocento (born unknown)
- 1473: Nikolaus Gerhaert – Dutch sculptor (born 1420)
- 1472: Leone Battista Alberti – Italian author who wrote treatises on painting and architecture have been hailed as the founding texts of a new form of art (born 1404)
- 1472: Michelozzo – Italian architect and sculptor (born 1396)
- 1472: Liu Jue – Chinese landscape painter, calligrapher, and poet during the Ming Dynasty (born 1409)
- 1471: Nōami – Japanese painter and renga poet in the service of the Ashikaga shogunate (born 1397)
- 1470: Jacopo Bellini – one of the founders of the Renaissance style of painting in Venice and northern Italy (born 1396)
- 1470: Barthélemy d'Eyck – Early Netherlandish artist who worked in France as a painter and manuscript illuminator (born 1420)
- 1470: Xia Chang – Chinese painter during the Ming Dynasty (born 1388)
- 1470: Jacques Daret – Early Netherlandish painter (born 1404)
- 1470: Dello di Niccolò Delli - Italian sculptor and painter from Florence (born 1403)
- 1470: Belbello da Pavia - Italian painter and illuminator (born unknown)
