= 1587 in art =

| List of years in art | (table) |
- … 1577; 1578; 1579; 1580; 1581; 1582; 1583; 1584; 1585; 1586; 1587; 1588; 1589; 1590; 1591; 1592; 1593; 1594; 1595; 1596; 1597 …
- Art; Archaeology; Architecture; Literature; Music; Philosophy; Science; +...

Events from the year 1587 in art.

== Events ==
- Statue of Trajan is replaced, by order of Pope Sixtus V, with the statue of Saint Peter on the Column of Trajan.

== Paintings ==
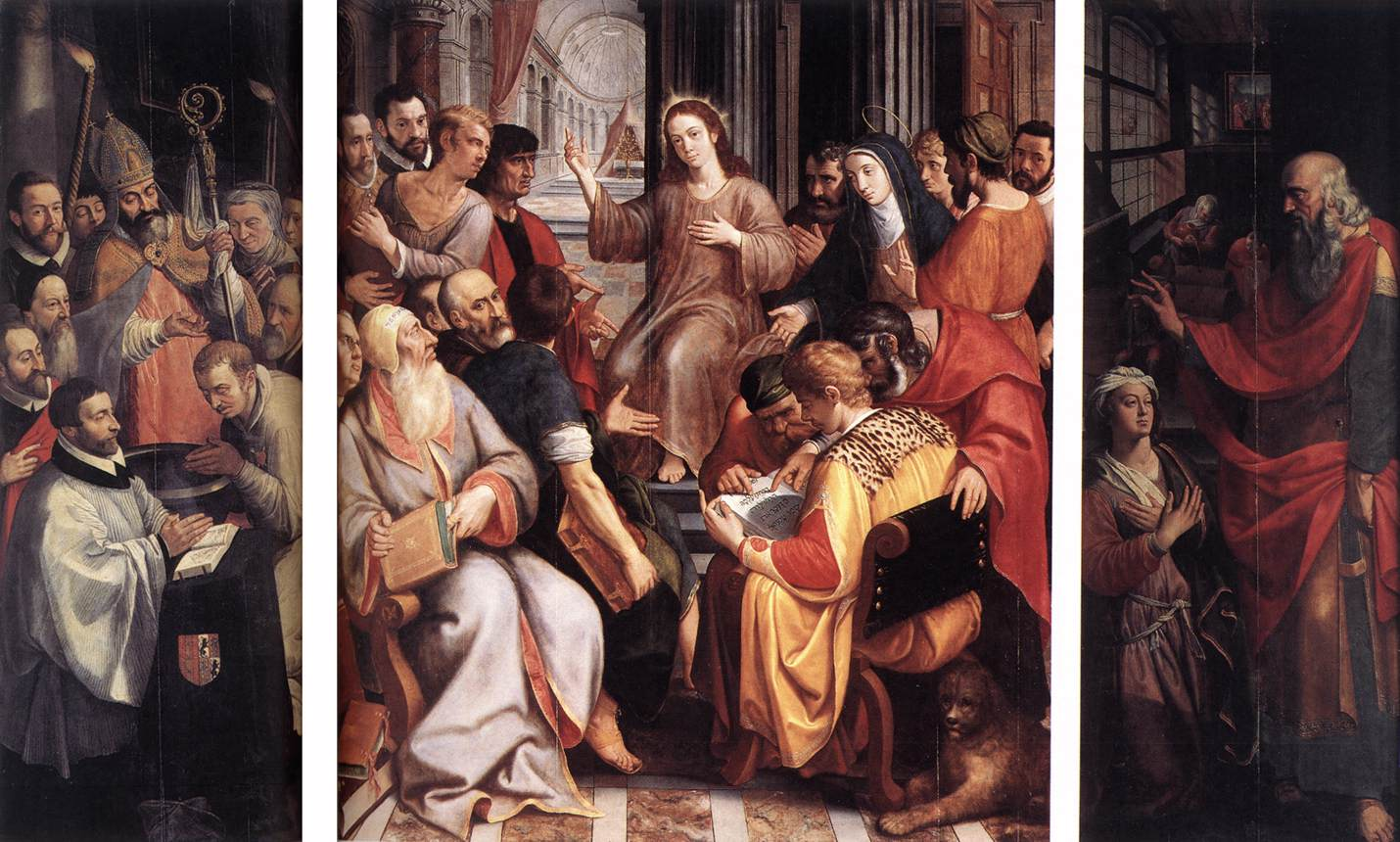
Francken – Jesus among the Doctors, Cathedral of Our Lady (Antwerp)

- Matteo Perez d'Aleccio - Saint Christopher (Church of San Miguel, Seville)
- Francken – Jesus among the Doctors

== Births ==
- April 26 (baptized) - Abraham van der Haagen, Dutch painter (died 1639)
- May - Esaias van de Velde, Dutch landscape painter (died 1630)
- December 8 (bapt.) - Martin Ryckaert, Flemish landscape painter (died 1631)
- date unknown
  - Francesco Allegrini da Gubbio, Italian painter of the Baroque period (died 1663)
  - Matteo Ingoli, Italian painter of the early-Baroque period (died 1631)
  - Claes Jansz. Visscher, Dutch genre painter (died 1652)
- probable
  - George Jamesone, Scottish portrait painter (died 1644)
  - Filippo Napoletano, Italian artist of diverse paintings of exotic soldiers, skeletons of animals, or cityscapes (died 1629
  - Bartolomé Román, Spanish Baroque painter known for his series of archangels (died 1647)
  - Giovanni Battista Vanni, Italian painter and engraver (died 1660)

== Deaths ==
- May 3 - Lelio Orsi, Italian Renaissance painter of the Reggio Emilia school (born 1511)
- September 25 - Giovanni Battista Fontana, Italian painter and engraver (born 1524)
- date unknown
  - Giovanni Anastasi, Italian painter (born 1540)
  - Lazzaro Calvi, Italian painter who frequently collaborated with his brother (born 1512)
  - Antonio Campi, Italian painter (born 1522)
  - Annibale Fontana, Italian sculptor and medallist (born 1540)
  - Giovanni Battista della Marca, Italian painter (born 1532)
  - Plautilla Nelli, Italian painter (born 1523)
  - Juan Valverde de Amusco, Italian anatomist and engraver (born 1525)
- probable - Caterina van Hemessen, Flemish Renaissance painter (b. 1528)
