= 1524 in art =

Events from the year 1524 in art.

== Events ==
- Marcantonio Raimondi publishes the first set of his erotic engravings I Modi in Rome (perhaps based on paintings by Giulio Romano), which will be suppressed (and Raimondi briefly imprisoned) by order of Pope Clement VII.

== Paintings ==
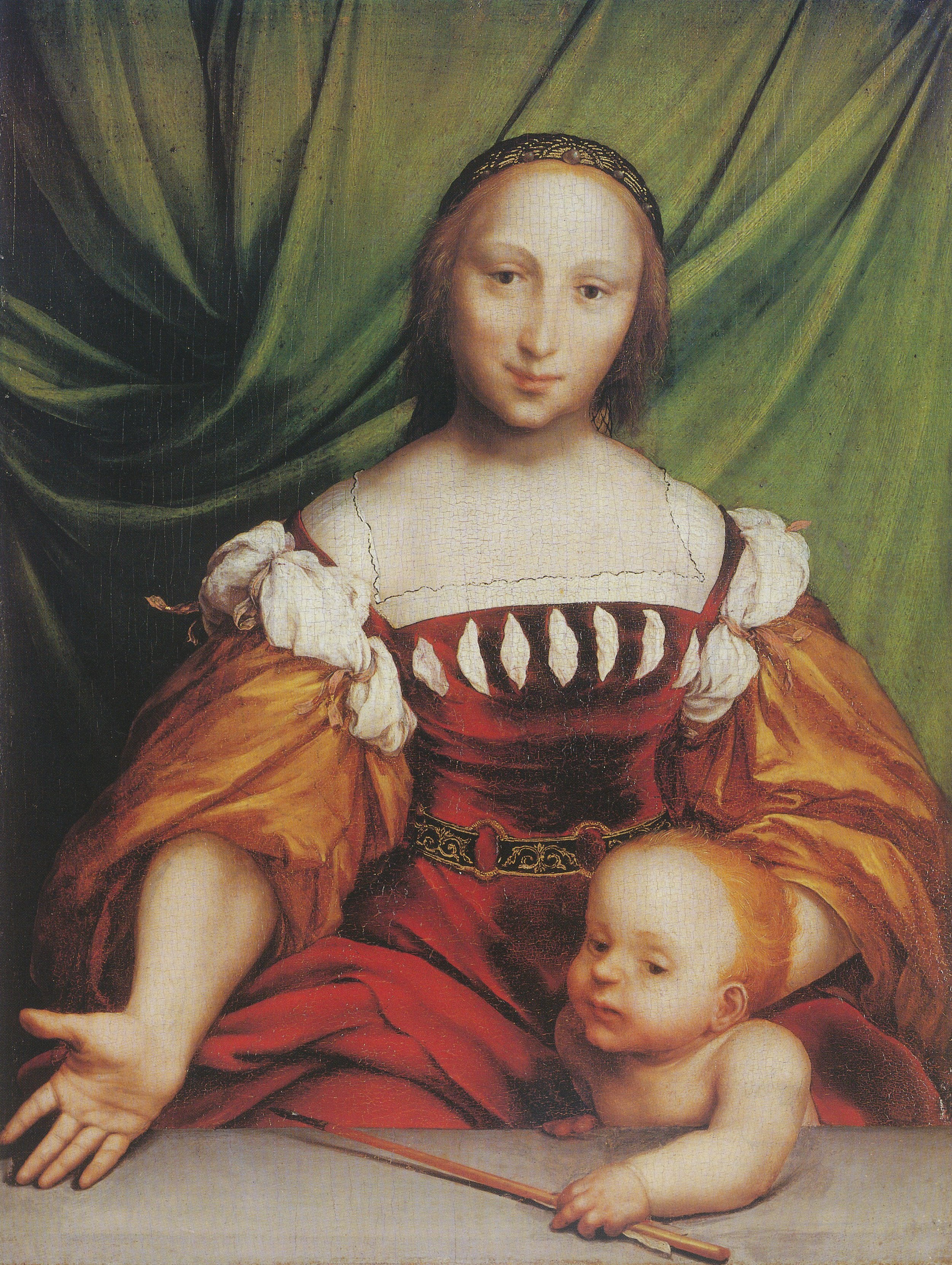
Hans Holbein the Younger, Venus and Amor, Kunstmuseum Basel, 1524

- Giovanni Francesco Bembo paints an altarpiece for San Pietro depicting a Madonna with three saints and a donor
- Hans Holbein the Younger paints Venus and Amor
- Giovanni Antonio Lappoli executed some frescoes for Visitation for Badia di Sante Fiore e Lucilla and Adoration of the Magi for the church of San Francisco
- Parmigianino paints a portrait of Gian Galeazzo Sanvitale, Count of Fontanellato
- Jan Provoost paints The Virgin in Glory at about this date, now in the Hermitage Museum
- Palma Vecchio completes the Polyptych of Saint Barbara altarpiece for Santa Maria Formosa in Venice (approximate date)
- Francesco Vecellio completes an altarpiece for San Vito in Cadore

== Births ==
- date unknown
  - Giovanni Battista Fontana, Italian painter and engraver (died 1587)
  - Hans Sebald Lautensack, German painter and etcher (died 1560)
  - Plautilla Nelli, Florentine religious painter and nun (died 1588)
  - Cipriano Piccolpasso, Italian painter of majolica (died 1579)
  - Willem Thibaut, Dutch Golden Age painter (died 1597)
- probable
  - Paolo Farinati, Italian painter of the Mannerist style (died 1606)
  - Petruccio Ubaldini, Italian calligraphist and illuminator on vellum (died 1600)

== Deaths ==
- October 5 - Joachim Patinir, Flemish Northern Renaissance history and landscape painter (born 1480)
- date unknown
  - Girolamo Alibrandi, Italian painter (born 1470)
  - Vasco de la Zarza, Spanish Renaissance sculptor (born unknown)
  - Hans Holbein the Elder, German painter (born 1460)
  - Tommaso Malvito, Italian sculptor (born unknown)
  - Andrea Solari, Italian Renaissance painter (born 1460)
  - Tang Yin, Chinese scholar, painter of the Ming dynasty (born 1470)
