= 1528 in art =

Events from the year 1528 in art.

== Events ==
Plague ravishes Venice, Bergamo and other Italian cities. Several eminent artists die in the outbreak.

== Works ==
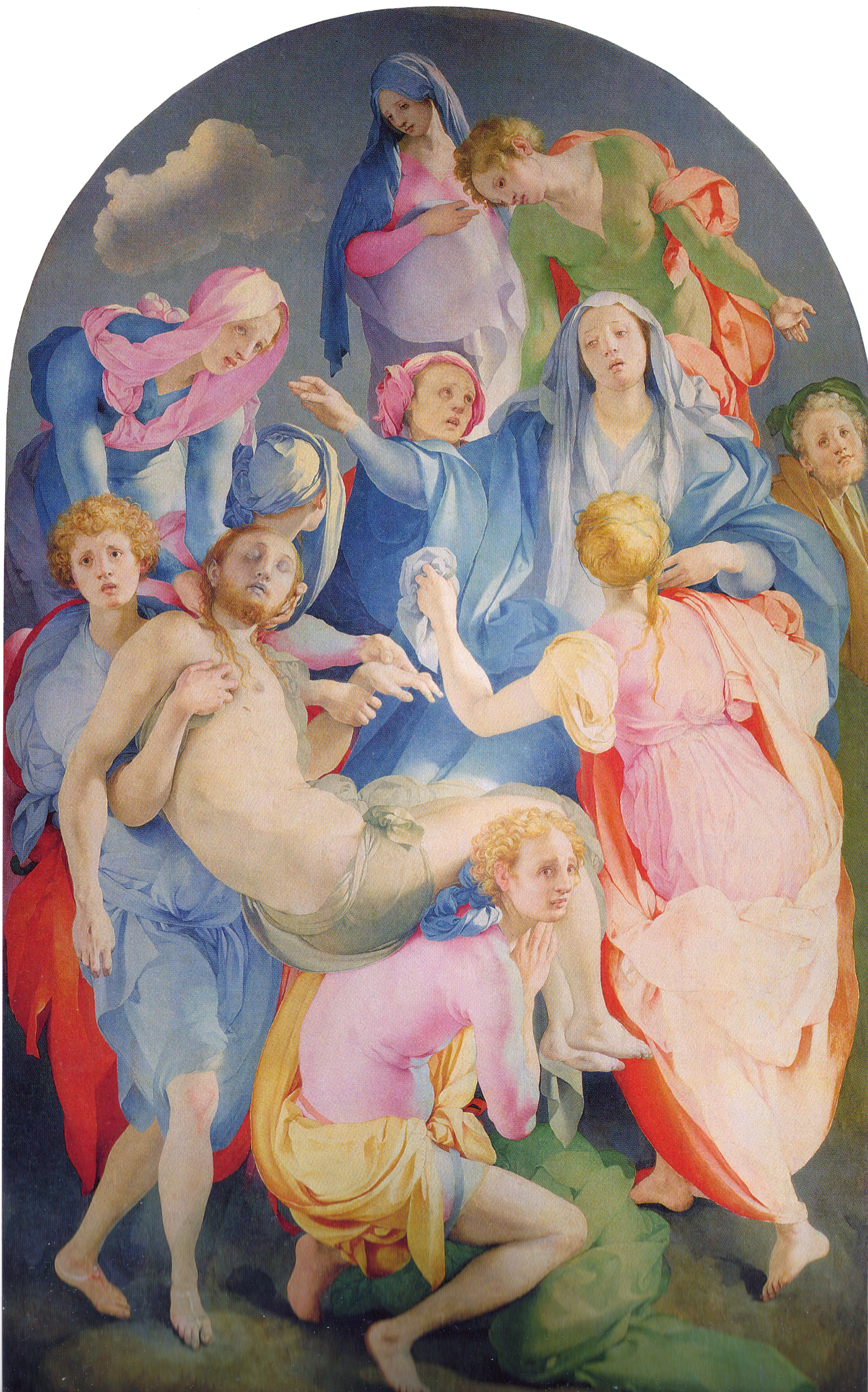
The Deposition from the Cross (Pontormo)

- Antonio da Correggio
  - Madonna of St. Jerome (approximate completion date)
  - Venus and Cupid with a Satyr
- Lucas Cranach the Elder
  - Adam and Eve
  - The Judgement of Paris (approximate date)
- Hans Holbein the Younger – The Artist's Family
- Pontormo – work in Capponi Chapel of Santa Felicita di Firenze
  - Annunciation (fresco)
  - The Deposition from the Cross (altarpiece)

== Births ==
- February 29 – Albert V, Duke of Bavaria, art patron and collector (died 1579)
- date unknown
  - Theodor de Bry, Flemish engraver and draftsman (died 1598)
  - Sigmund Feyerabend, German bookseller and wood-engraver (died 1590)
  - Bernardino India, Italian painter (died 1590)
  - Marco Marchetti, Italian painter (died 1588)
  - Gillis Mostaert and Frans Mostaert, Dutch painters, twin sons of Jan Mostaert (died 1598) and 1560) respectively
  - Paolo Veronese, Italian painter of the Renaissance in Venice (died 1588)
  - Caterina van Hemessen, Flemish Renaissance painter (died 1587)

== Deaths ==
- April 26 – Albrecht Dürer, German painter, printmaker and theorist from Nuremberg, Germany (born 1471)
- July - Palma Vecchio, Italian painter of the Venetian school (born 1480)
- July 3 - Floriano Ferramola, Italian painter (date of birth unknown)
- August - Pietro Torrigiano, Italian sculptor (born 1472)
- August 31 – Matthias Grünewald, German painter (born 1470)
- date unknown
  - Pier Jacopo Alari Bonacolsi - North Italian sculptor, known for his finely detailed small bronzes (born 1460)
  - Jan de Beer, Dutch painter (born 1475)
  - Jacob van Laethem - Flemish painter of the Early Netherlandish painting era (born 1470)
  - Peter Vischer the Younger, German sculptor (born 1487)
- victims of the plague
  - Pier Jacopo Alari Bonacolsi, Italian sculptor (born c.1460)
  - Domenico Caprioli, Italian painter (born 1494)
  - Maturino da Firenze, Italian painter (born 1490)
  - Gianfrancesco Penni, Italian painter (born c.1488)
  - Andrea Previtali, Italian painter (born c.1490)
- probable - Wilm Dedeke, late gothic painter from Northern Germany (born 1460)
