= 1631 in art =

Events from the year 1631 in art.

== Events ==
- Rembrandt moves to the home of Hendrick van Uylenburgh at Sint Antoniesbreestraat in Amsterdam.

== Works ==
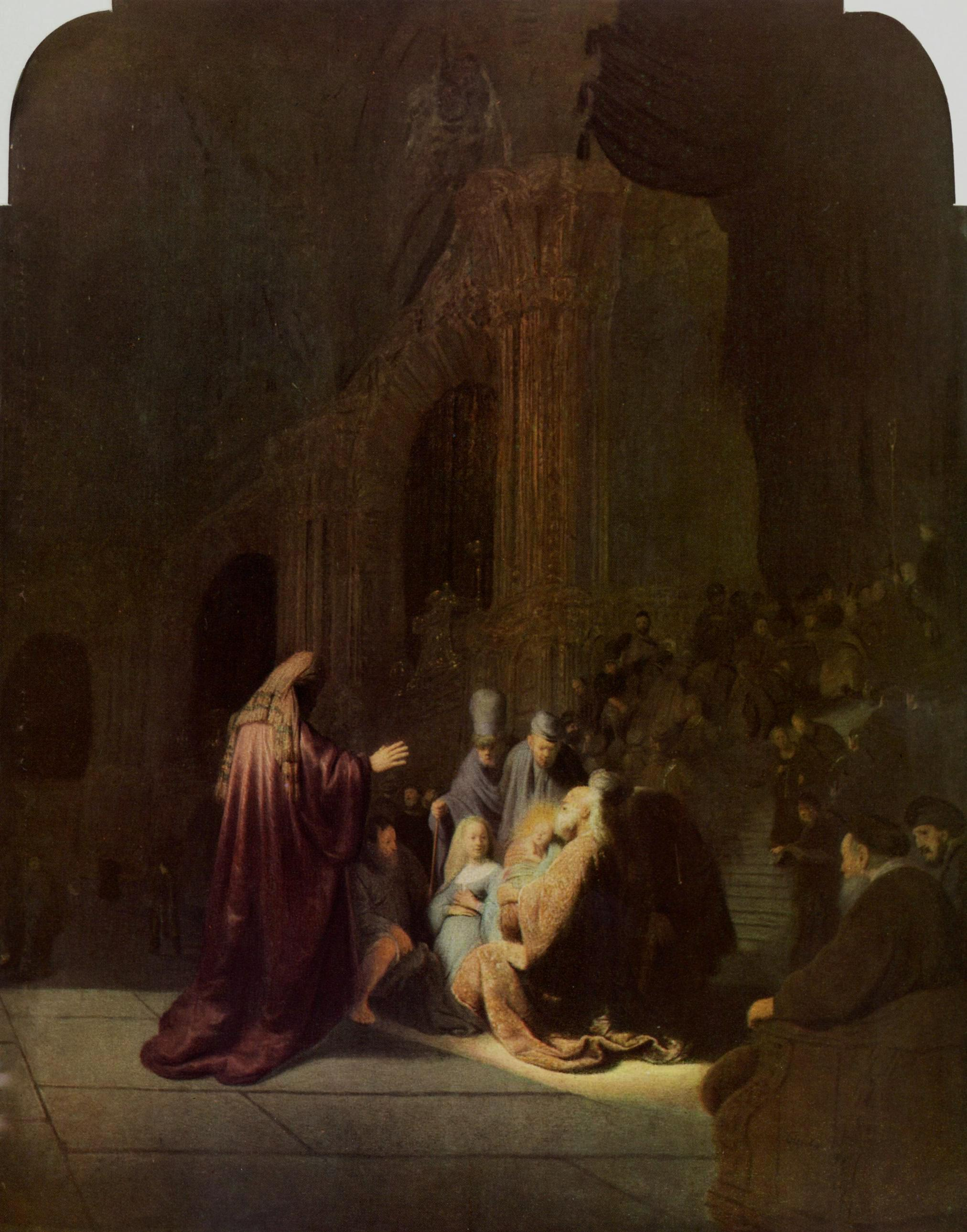
Rembrandt – Simeon's Song of Praise, Mauritshuis

- Willem Claesz Heda - Still lifes
- Judith Leyster - The Rejected Offer
- Nicolas Poussin - Kingdom of Flora
- Rembrandt
  - Presentation in the Temple (usually called "Simeon in the Temple"), the earliest important composition of the artist known
  - Simeon's Song of Praise
  - Christ Alone
  - The Crucifixion
  - Self portrait in a soft hat and embroidered cloak (etching)
- José de Ribera
  - Landscape (Hospital de Tavera, Toledo, Spain)
  - Saint Andrew
- Nicholas Stone - funerary monuments (London)
  - John Donne (Old St Paul's Cathedral)
  - Sir George Villiers and the Countess of Buckingham (Westminster Abbey)
- Francisco de Zurbarán - Apotheosis of Saint Thomas Aquinas

== Births ==
- March 3 - Esaias Boursse, Dutch painter of genre works (died 1672)
- April - Cornelis de Heem, still-life painter associated with both Flemish Baroque and Dutch Golden Age painting (died 1695)
- November 28 - Abraham Brueghel, Flemish painter from the famous Brueghel family of artists (died 1690)
- date unknown
  - Germain Audran, French engraver (died 1710)
  - Benjamin Block, German–Hungarian painter known for his portrait paintings (died 1690)
  - Adriaen van der Cabel, Dutch painter (died 1705)
  - Pompeo Ghitti, Italian painter of frescoes (died 1703/1704)
  - Bernard Lens I, Dutch painter and writer of religious treatises (died 1707)
  - Antonio Zanchi, Italian painter of canvases for churches in Venice (died 1722)
- probable - Cornelis Pietersz Bega (the "Little Master"), Dutch painter, etcher and draughtsman (died 1664)

== Deaths ==
- January 20 - Jacob Matham, Dutch engraver and pen-draftsman (born 1571)
- March 28 - Juan van der Hamen, Spanish still life painter (born 1596)
- April 5 - Sinibaldo Scorza, Italian painter, draughtsman and etcher (born 1589)
- June 10 - Giovanni Serodine, Italian painter in Caravaggisti and tenebrist styles (born 1600)
- August - Arent Arentsz, Dutch painter (born 1585)
- October 11 - Marten Ryckaert, Flemish painter (born 1587)
- c. November 5 - Johann Liss, German-born painter (born c. 1597)
- December - Jan Pynas, Dutch painter (born 1583)
- December 10 - Orazio Riminaldi, Italian Caravaggisti painter (born 1586)
- date unknown
  - Matteo Ingoli, Italian painter (born 1587)
  - Gregorius Sickinger, Swiss painter, draughtsman, and engraver (born 1558)
  - Jan Tengnagel, Dutch painter (born 1584)
  - Pieter van der Borcht, Flemish painter (born 1604)
  - Tobias Verhaecht, Landscape painter and draughtsman in Italy and Antwerp (born 1561)
