= Giovanni Anastasi =

Giovanni Anastasi may refer to:

- Giovanni Anastasi (1653–1704), an Italian painter
- Giovanni d'Anastasi (ca. 1780–1860), a Greek merchant in Egypt
- Giovanni Anastasi (1861–1926), a Swiss teacher, journalist, and writer
