= 1598 in art =

Events from the year 1598 in art.

== Events ==
- Marin le Bourgeoys is appointed Valet de Chambre to King Henry IV of France. At court he produces artwork, firearms, air guns, crossbows, and movable globes.
- The first recorded use of the term "landscape" in English, to refer to a genre of painting, borrowed from the Dutch term "landschap".

== Works ==
- Federico Barocci (Galleria Borghese, Rome)
  - Aeneas' Flight from Troy
  - St. Jerome
- Caravaggio
  - Saint Catherine
  - Sacrifice of Isaac
  - Martha and Mary Magdalene
  - Portrait of Maffeo Barberini
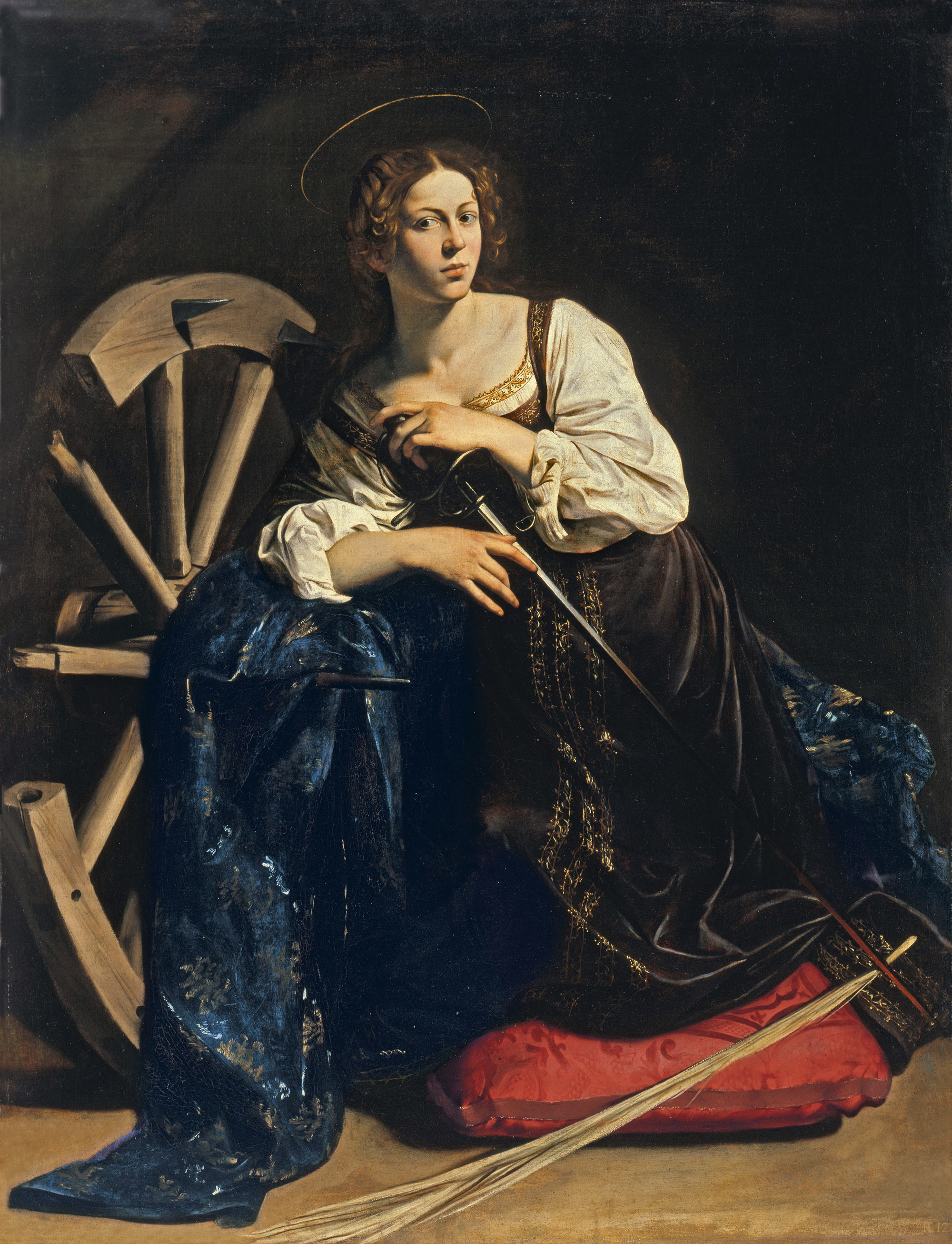
Caravaggio, Saint Catherine

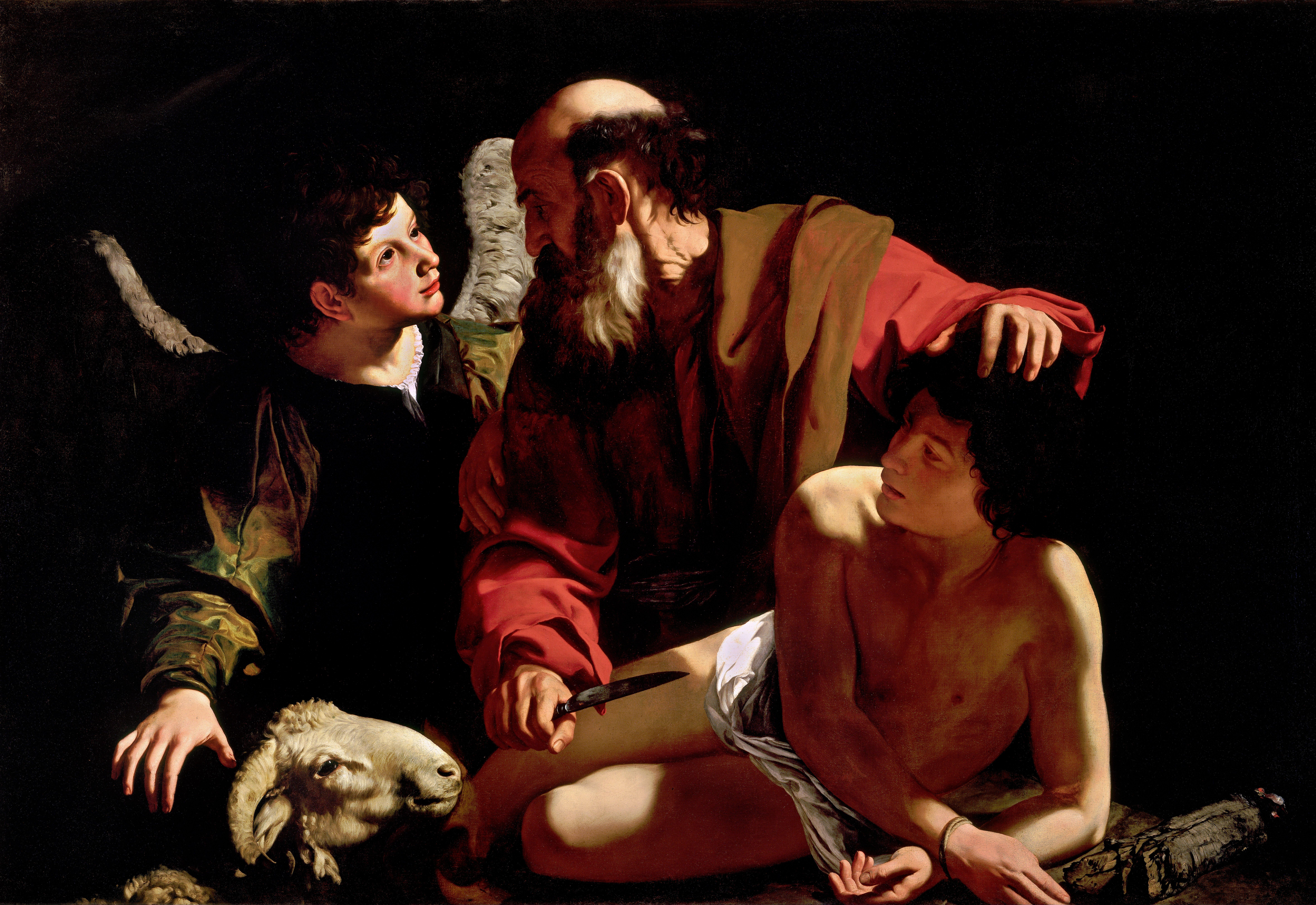
Caravaggio, Sacrifice of Isaac

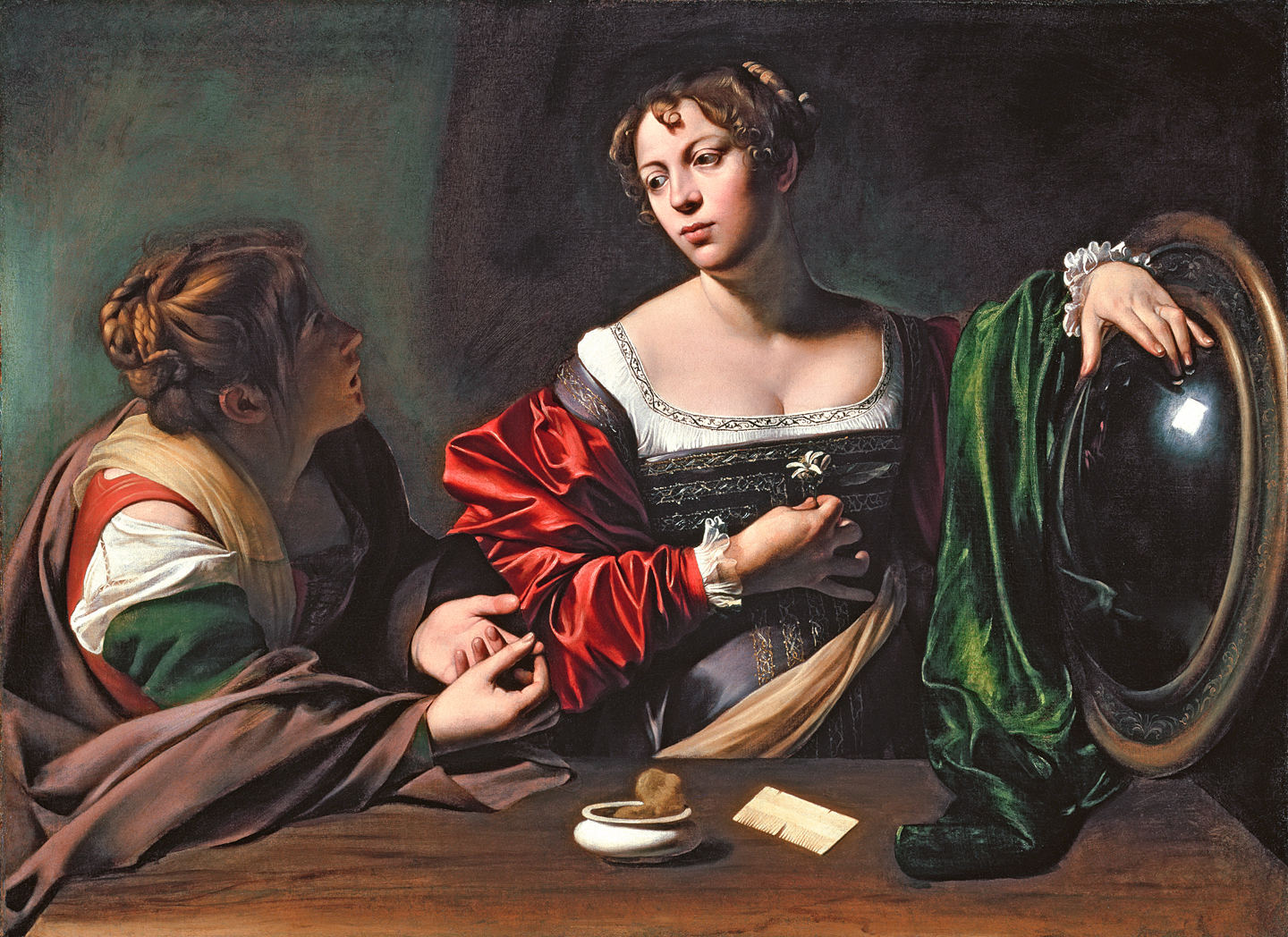
Caravaggio, Martha and Mary Magdalene

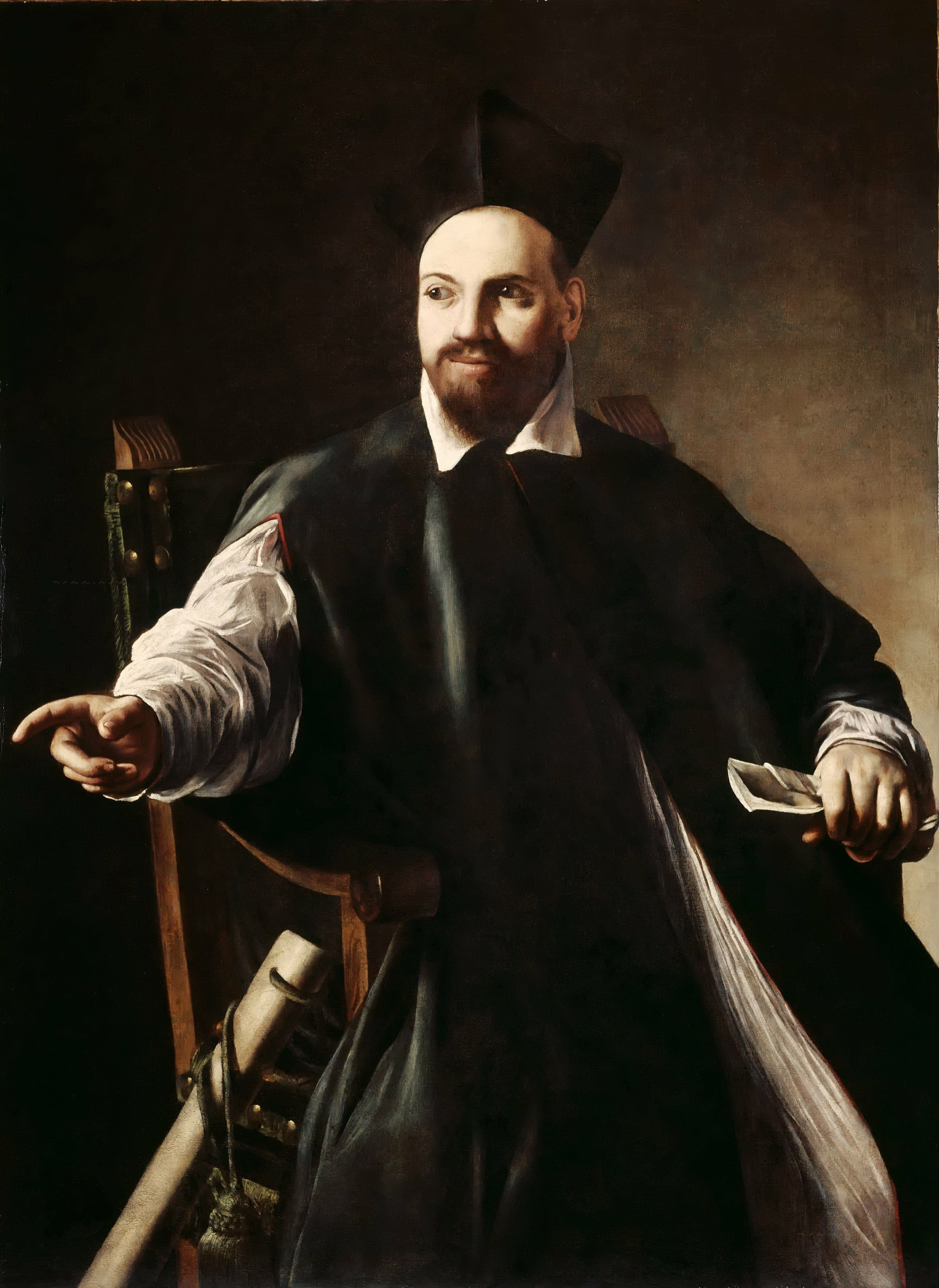
Caravaggio, Portrait of Maffeo Barberini

== Births ==
- May 23 - Claude Mellan, French engraver and painter (died 1688)
- July 31 – Alessandro Algardi, Italian sculptor (died 1654)
- baptized November 7 – Francisco de Zurbarán, Spanish Baroque painter (died 1664)
- December 7 – Gian Lorenzo Bernini, Italian Baroque sculptor and architect of 17th century Rome (died 1680)
- date unknown
  - Bartholomeus Breenbergh, Dutch painter (died 1657)
  - Domingos da Cunha, Portuguese painter (died 1644)
  - Giovanni Andrea de Ferrari, Italian painter of the Baroque period active in Genoa (died 1669)
  - Willem de Passe, Dutch engraver and designer of medals (died 1637)
  - Chen Hongshou, Chinese painter of late Ming Dynasty (died 1652)
  - Willem Hondius, Dutch engraver, cartographer and painter (died 1652/1658)
  - Lambert Jacobsz, Dutch painter (died 1636)
  - Jean Lemaire, French painter (died 1659)
  - Bernard van Linge, Dutch glass and enamel painter (died 1644)
- probable - Wang Jian, Chinese landscape painter during the Qing Dynasty (died 1677)

== Deaths ==
- March 27 - Theodor de Bry, Flemish-born engraver, draftsman and book editor and publisher (born 1528)
- April 19 - Hans Fugger, patron of the arts (born 1531)
- June 25 - Giacomo Gaggini, Italian sculptor (born 1517)
- December 28 - Gillis Mostaert, Dutch painter, son of Jan Mostaert (b. c.1535)
- date unknown
  - Giovanni Antonio di Amato the younger, Italian painter (born 1528)
  - René Boyvin, French engraver who lived in Angers (born 1525)
  - Benedetto Caliari, Italian painter (born 1538)
  - Jacopino del Conte, Italian Mannerist painter (born 1510)
  - Guillaume Le Bé, French engraver (born 1525)
- probable - Marcin Kober, Polish court painter to King Stefan Batory (born 1550)
