= 1539 in art =

Events from the year 1539 in art.

== Works ==
=== Painting ===
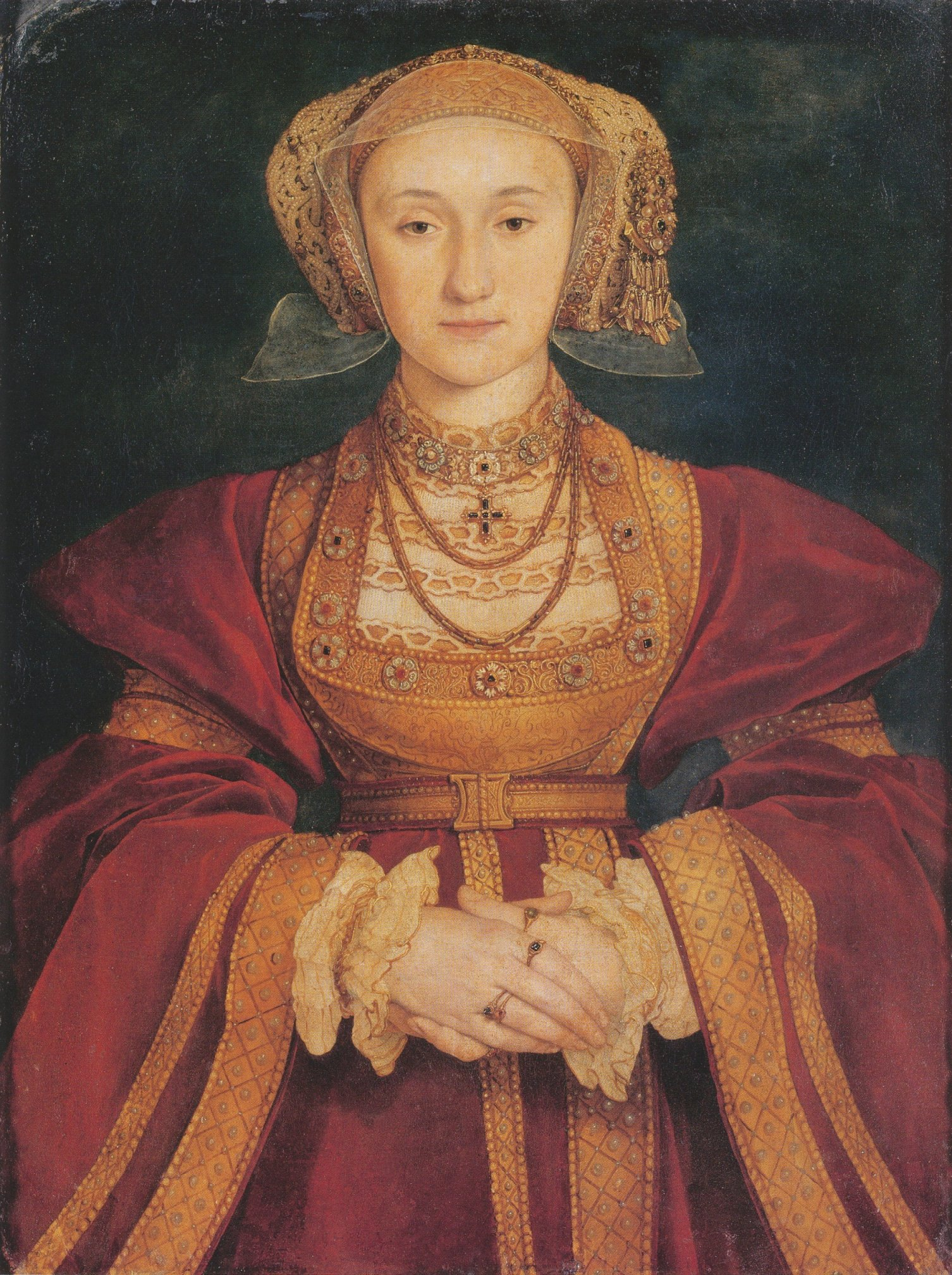
Holbein – Anne of Cleves

- Hans Baldung – Virgin and Child
- Jacopo Bassano – Christ Among the Doctors
- Hans Holbein the Younger – Portrait of Anne of Cleves (probable date)

== Births ==
- June 13 - Jost Amman, Swiss illustrator (died 1591)
- Pietro Facchetti, Italian painter primarily of portraits (died 1613)
- Hasegawa Tōhaku, Japanese painter and founder of the Hasegawa school of Japanese painting during the Azuchi-Momoyama period (died 1610)

== Deaths ==
- Isabella d'Este, Italian noblewoman (Marchioness of Mantua), art collector, and patroness (born 1474)
- Marco Palmezzano, Italian painter and architect (born 1460)
- Il Pordenone, Italian painter of the Venetian school, active during the Renaissance (born 1483)
- Giacomo Pacchiarotti, Italian painter (born 1474)
