= 1512 in art =

Events from the year 1512 in art.

== Events ==
- Michelangelo completes his nine Sistine Chapel ceiling paintings of the Creation.

== Works ==
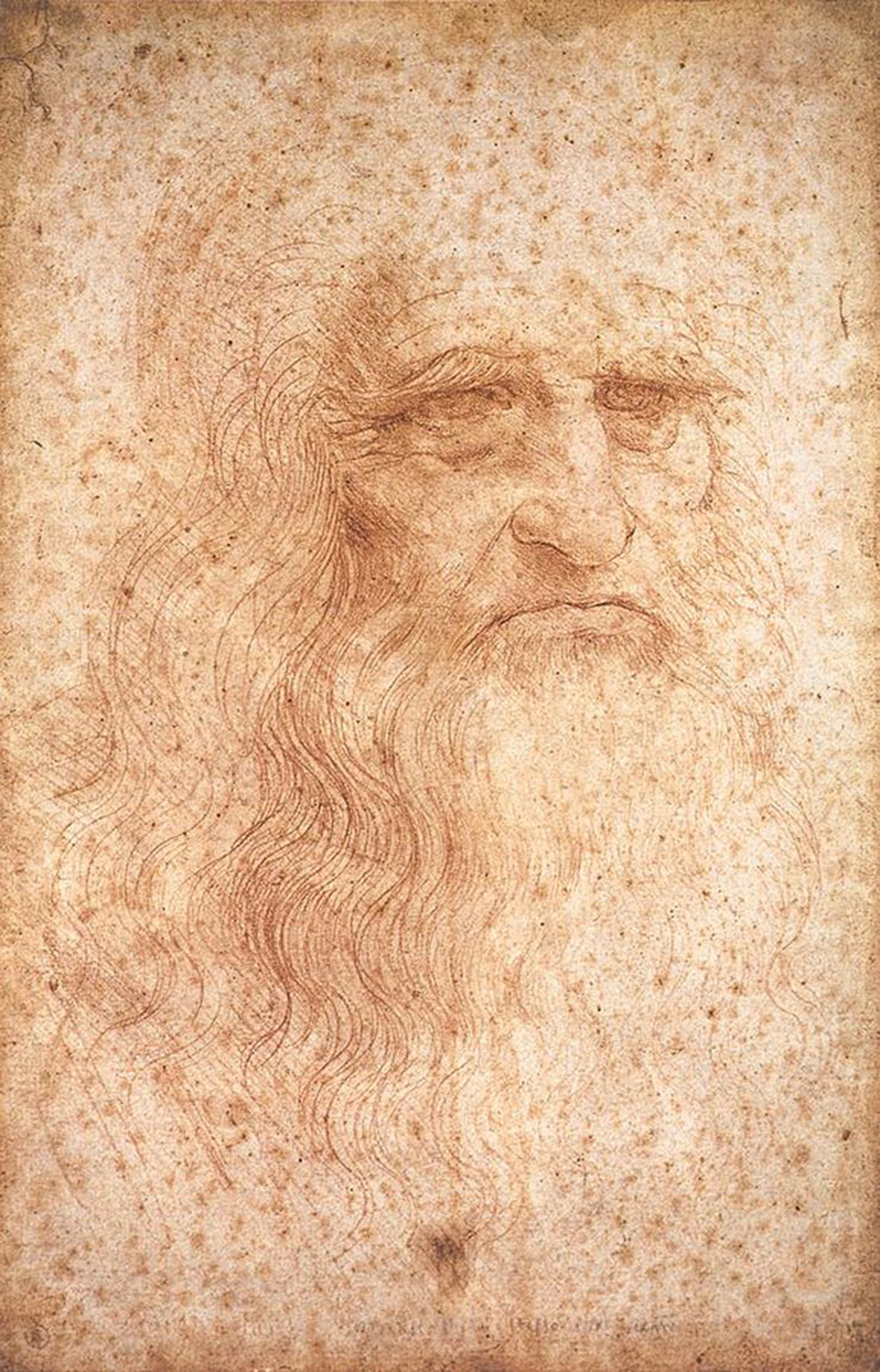
Leonardo da Vinci, Self-portrait in red chalk

- Hans Baldung – The Trinity and Mystic Pietà
- Fra Bartolomeo – Madonna in Glory with Saints (altarpiece, Besançon Cathedral, 1511–12)
- Albrecht Dürer – The Virgin Mary Appearing to St. John on Patmos (woodcut)
- Leonardo da Vinci – Self-portrait in red chalk (approximate date)
- Michelangelo – Sistine Chapel ceiling, including the Separation of Light from Darkness (completed)
- Raphael
  - The Expulsion of Heliodorus from the Temple (fresco in the Raphael Rooms of the Apostolic Palace in the Vatican)
  - The Triumph of Galatea (fresco in Villa Farnesina in Rome)
- Titian – approximate date
  - The Gypsy Madonna
  - La Schiavona
  - The Three Ages of Man
- Lucas van Leyden – The History of Joseph series of engravings, e.g. Joseph Explains Pharaoh's Dream
- Bernard van Orley – Triptych of the Carpenters and Masons Corporation of Brussels ("Apostle Altar")

== Births ==
- date unknown
  - Lazzaro Calvi, Italian painter who frequently collaborated with his brother (died 1587)
  - Luis de Morales, Spanish painter known as "El Divino" (died 1586)
  - Battista del Moro, Italian painter of the Renaissance period active in his native Verona (died 1568)
  - Prospero Fontana, Italian painter of the late Renaissance, (died 1597)
- (born 1512/1520): Giorgio Ghisi, Italian coppersmith, painter, and engraver (died 1582)
- 1512/1515: Marcello Venusti, Italian Mannerist painter primarily in Rome (died 1579)

== Deaths ==
- April 5 - Lazzaro Bastiani, Italian painter of the Renaissance, active mainly in Venice (born 1449)
- date unknown - Giovanni Cristoforo Romano, Italian sculptor and medallist (born 1456)
