= Guglielmo da Marsiglia =

Italian painter

Guglielmo da Marsiglia (1475–1537) was an Italian painter of stained glass of the 16th century. He is also known as Guglielmo da Marcillat and was a native of St. Mihiel near Meuse, France.

He created 3 windows in 1519 for the Cathedral of Arezzo for a fee of 180 ducats. He completed two windows in the church of Santa Maria del Popolo composed of 12 scenes from the lives of Christ and The Virgin Mary (1509). He also painted in frescos. One of his pupils was the painter, architect and biographer Giorgio Vasari.
