= Saint Andrew (Ribera, Madrid) =

Painting by Jusepe di Ribera

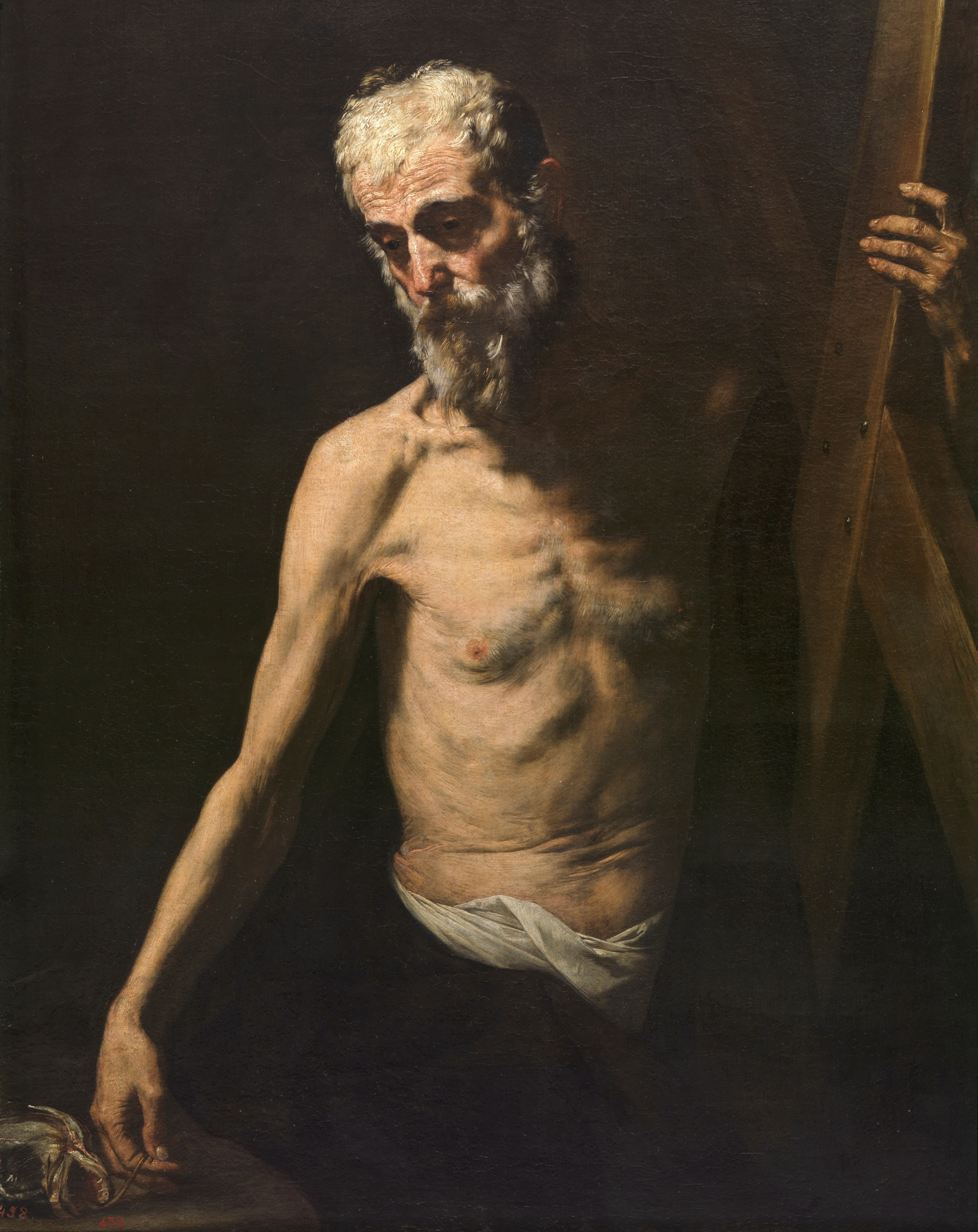

Saint Andrew is a 1631 oil on canvas painting by Jusepe di Ribera, now in the Museo del Prado in Madrid.

It originated in the royal collection at the Casita del Príncipe in the Escorial. A Marià Fortuny i Marsal copy was also acquired by the Prado in 2014.
