= Pietro Facchetti =

Italian painter (1539–1613)

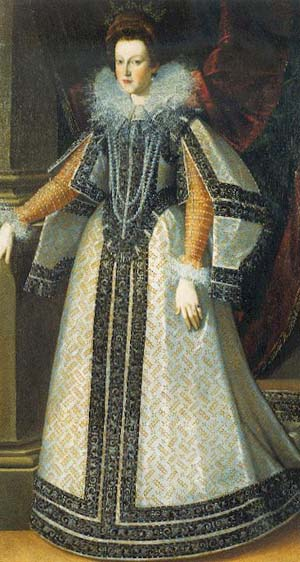
Pietro Facchetti, Maria de Medici, c. 1595

Pietro Facchetti (1539 – 27 February 1613) was an Italian painter of the late Renaissance, mainly active in Rome.

Born to a poor family in Mantua, Facchetti initially trained with Lorenzo Costa the younger, but then moved to Rome and joined the studio of Scipione da Gaeta, where he gained fame as a portrait painter.
