= Marco Bello =

Italian painter

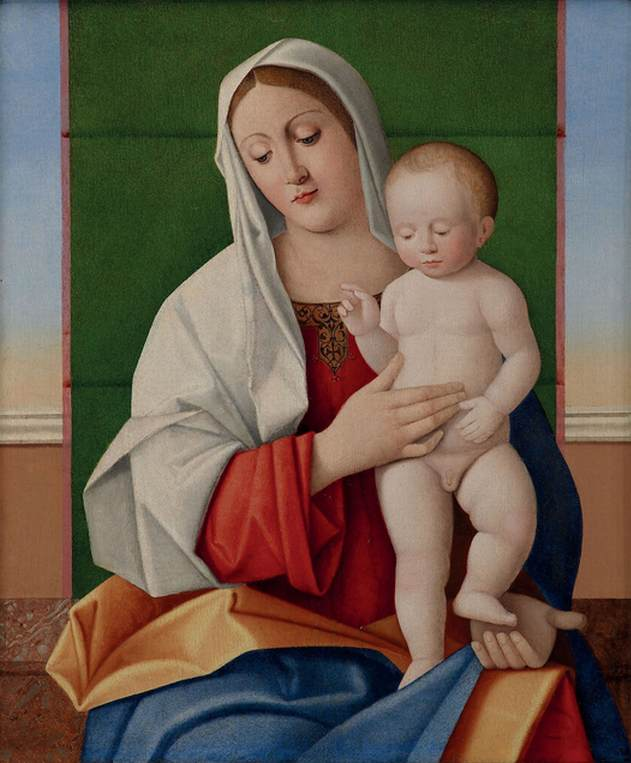
- Madonna with Jesus, Private collection
- Born: c. 1470; Venezia
- Died: 1523 (aged 53); Udine
- Style: Renaissance

Marco Bello (c. 1470 – 1523) was an Italian painter active in the Renaissance period. He was one of the pupils in the studio of Giovanni Bellini.
