= The Dead Lovers =

German Gothic painting circa 1470

- The Rotting Pair
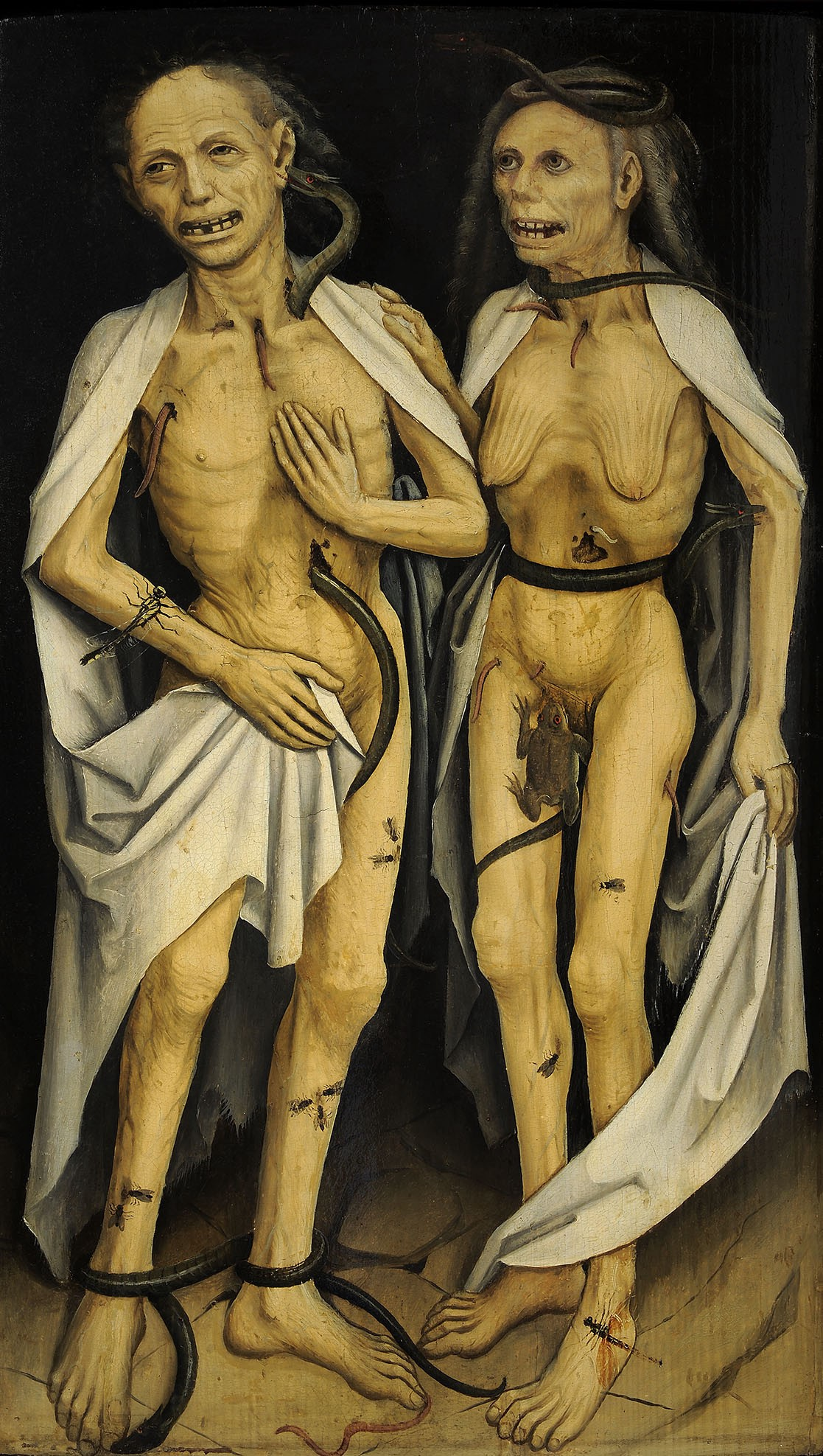
- Artist: Anonymous master from Swabia or Upper Rhine
- Year: c. 1470
- Medium: oil painting on panel (fir)
- Movement: Gothic art Allegory
- Subject: Death; Decomposition; Vanitas; Memento mori
- Dimensions: 62 cm × 40 cm (24 in × 16 in); alternative dimensions: 65.2 × 40 cm (25.7 × 16 in); 62.5 × 40 cm (24.6 × 16 in)
- Location: Musée de l'Œuvre Notre-Dame, Strasbourg

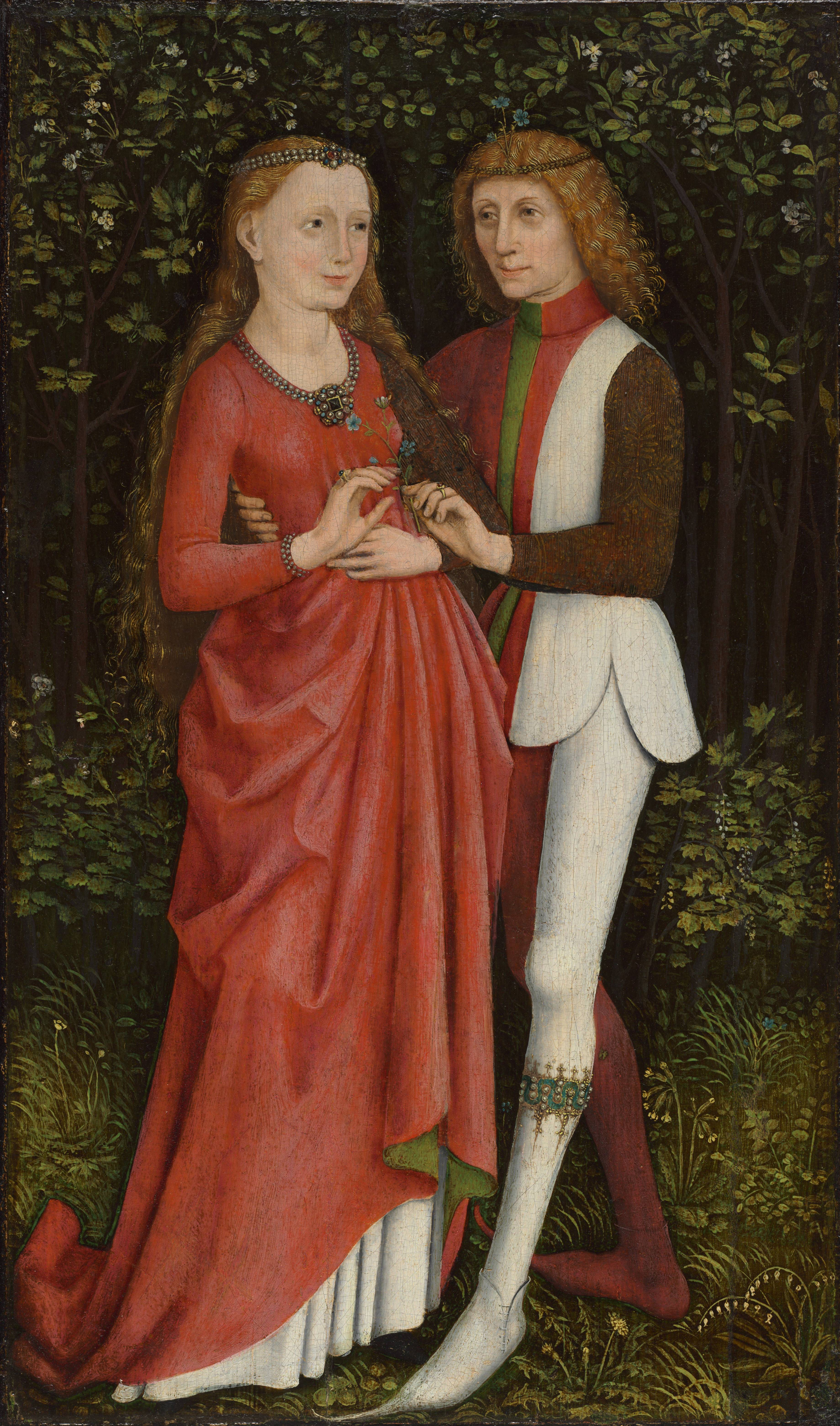
The painting's obverse (Cleveland)

The Dead Lovers, also known as The Rotting Pair, is a circa 1470 painting by a German Gothic artist, probably from Ulm or more generally from Swabia or the Upper Rhine region. It is on display in the Musée de l'Œuvre Notre-Dame. Its inventory number is MBA 1442 ("MBA" stands for Musée des Beaux-Arts).

The painting was at first attributed to a young Matthias Grünewald, but this attribution has been rejected since. The author is more likely to have been familiar with, or close to, the so-called Master of the Housebook. The Strasbourg painting once had been the reverse of a panel now kept in the Cleveland Museum of Art, which shows a young and fashionable couple in full bloom; both paintings had been sawn apart in the early 20th century.

The Dead Lovers depicts the young couple as putrefying cadavers, infested by snakes, worms, a toad, and insects such as flies and dragonflies. In spite of this, the two "living dead" still appear quite robust, and still display signs of mutual affection, such as the bride's hand on the bridegroom's shoulder. The Dead Lovers serves as a reminder of mortality.
