= 1579 in art =

Events from the year 1579 in art.

== Events ==
- The painter Giovanni Battista Paggi is said to have mortally wounded a patron, and is forced to flee his home city of Genoa.
- The Da Zhao Temple is built in inner Mongolia. Its art treasures include a 10 ft silver Sakyamuni buddha statue.

== Works ==
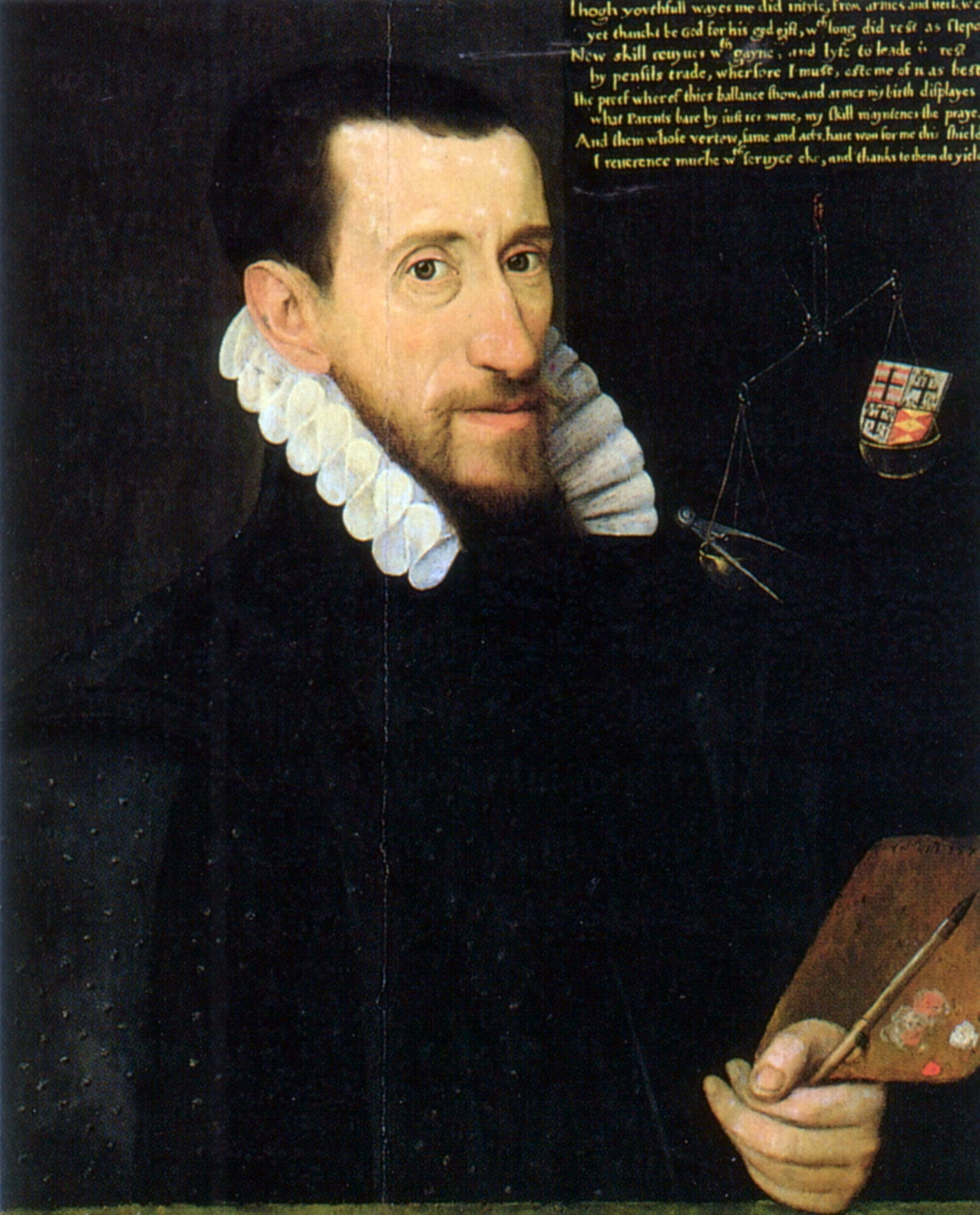
George Gower, Self-portrait (1579)

- Federico Barocci paints the Madonna del Popolo (Uffizi).
- El Greco completes The Disrobing of Christ.
- Giambologna begins the Rape of the Sabine Women, a remarkable example of Mannerist sculpture.
- George Gower paints a self-portrait.
- Plimpton Sieve Portrait of Queen Elizabeth

== Births ==
- November 7 - Juan de Peñalosa, Spanish painter of altarpieces, a priest and poet (died 1633)
- November 11 - Frans Snyders, Flemish still-life master, apprenticed in 1593 to Pieter II Brueghel (died 1657)
- date unknown
  - Trophime Bigot, French painter (died 1649)
  - Carlo Saraceni, Italian early-Baroque painter of landscapes, cabinet paintings, and altarpieces (died 1620)
- probable - Ottavio Viviani, Italian painter of quadratura (died 1641)

== Deaths ==
- February 5 - Giovanni Battista Moroni, Italian portrait painter (born 1520/1524)
- March 28 - Juan Fernández Navarrete, Spanish Mannerist painter (born 1526)
- October 15 - Marcello Venusti, Italian Mannerist painter primarily in Rome (born 1512/1515)
- October 24 - Albert V, Duke of Bavaria, art patron and collector (born 1528)
- November 21 - Cipriano Piccolpasso, Italian painter of majolica (born 1524)
- December 21 – Juan Vicente Macip (or Vicente Joanes Masip), Spanish painter of the Renaissance period (born 1507)
- date unknown
  - Giovanni Bernardo Lama, Italian painter (born 1508)
  - Andrew Mansioun, French woodcarver and engraver at the court of King James V of Scotland (date of birth unknown)
  - Filippo Negroli, Italian armourer (born c.1510)
