= Portrait of a Man (Antonello da Messina, London) =

Painting by Antonello da Messina

Portrait of a Young Man
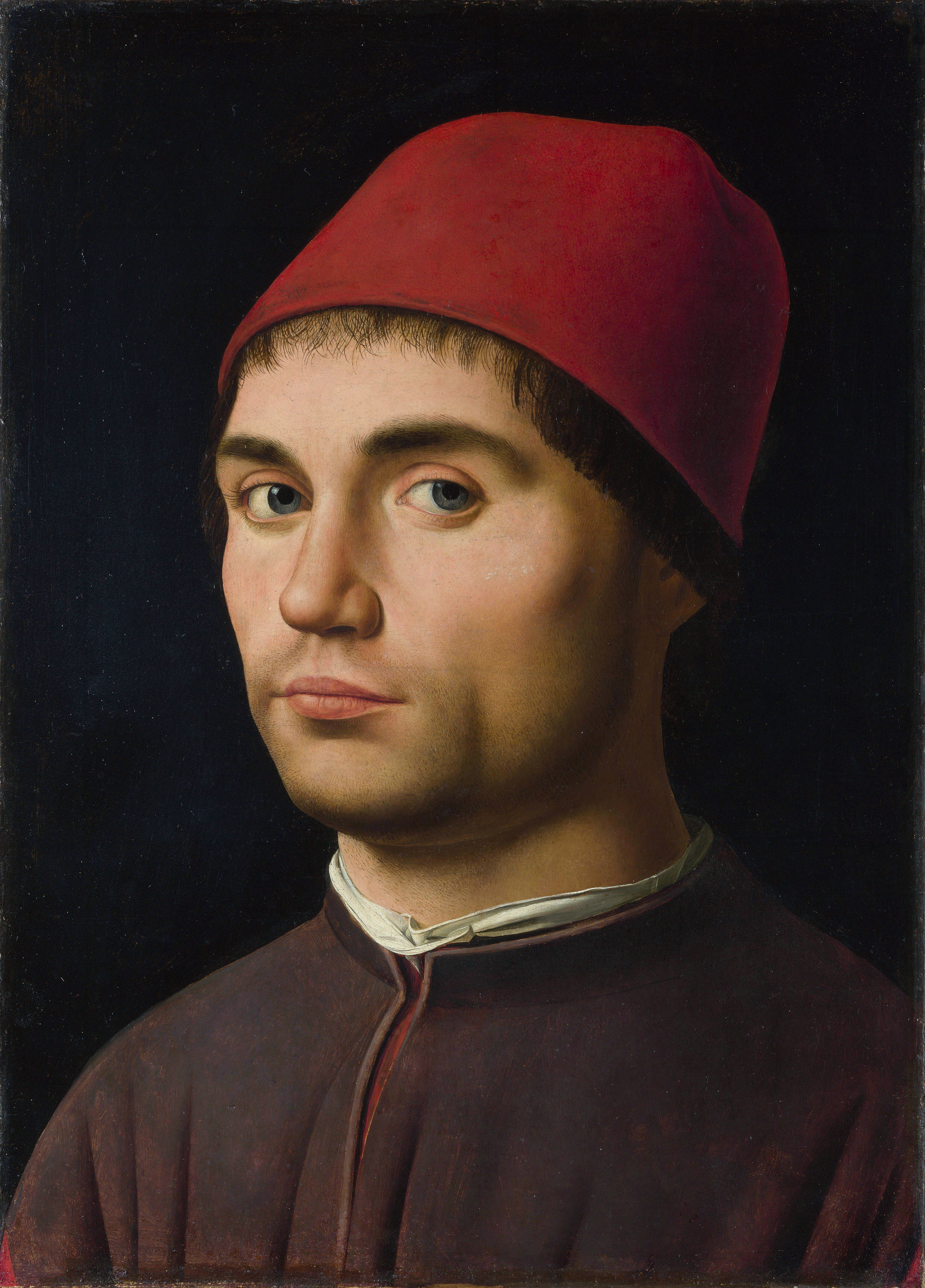
- Artist: Antonello da Messina
- Year: 1475–76
- Type: Panel
- Dimensions: 25.5 cm × 35.5 cm (10.0 in × 14.0 in)
- Location: National Gallery, London

Portrait of a Man is an oil painting by the Italian Renaissance artist Antonello da Messina, dated to c. 1475–76, and now in the National Gallery, London. It was printed on the Italian 5,000 lire note issued from 1979 to 1983.

== Description ==
The painting, in oils on a poplar panel, measures 35.6 cm × 25.4 cm (14.0 in × 10.0 in). It portrays an unknown man, whose garments belonged to the middle-upper class of the time. He wears a leather blouse, under which a white shirt is visible, and a red cloth cap. Antonello uses layers of colour with graduations of tones to build up a portrait with a realistic three-dimensional appearance. The composition, a strongly illuminated and tightly cropped three-quarters view set against a dark background, departs from the Italian tradition of the time, and is derived from the Flemish school, including Petrus Christus, whom Antonello knew personally in Italy. Compare for example Van Eyck's 1433 Portrait of a Man in a Red Turban.

The work is one of twelve surviving portraits by Antonello, all bust-length head-and-shoulders views of men and mostly against dark backgrounds. The painting was bought by the National Gallery, London, in 1883. X-ray analysis has shown that the eyes originally looked in a different direction. It was at one time considered a self-portrait, but that is no longer believed to be the case. The work may once have included a parapet with a signature, similar to several of Antonello's other portraits, but which was cut off later. It has been suggested that this late work could be a self-portrait.

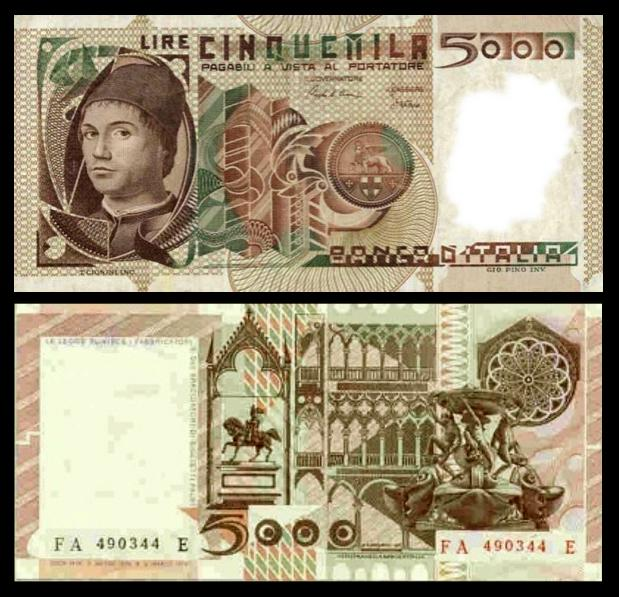
Italian 5,000 lire note issued from 1979 to 1983

== See also ==
- Male portraits by Antonello da Messina
