= Portrait of Maffeo Barberini =

Painting by Caravaggio

- Ritratto di Maffeo Barberini (Italian)
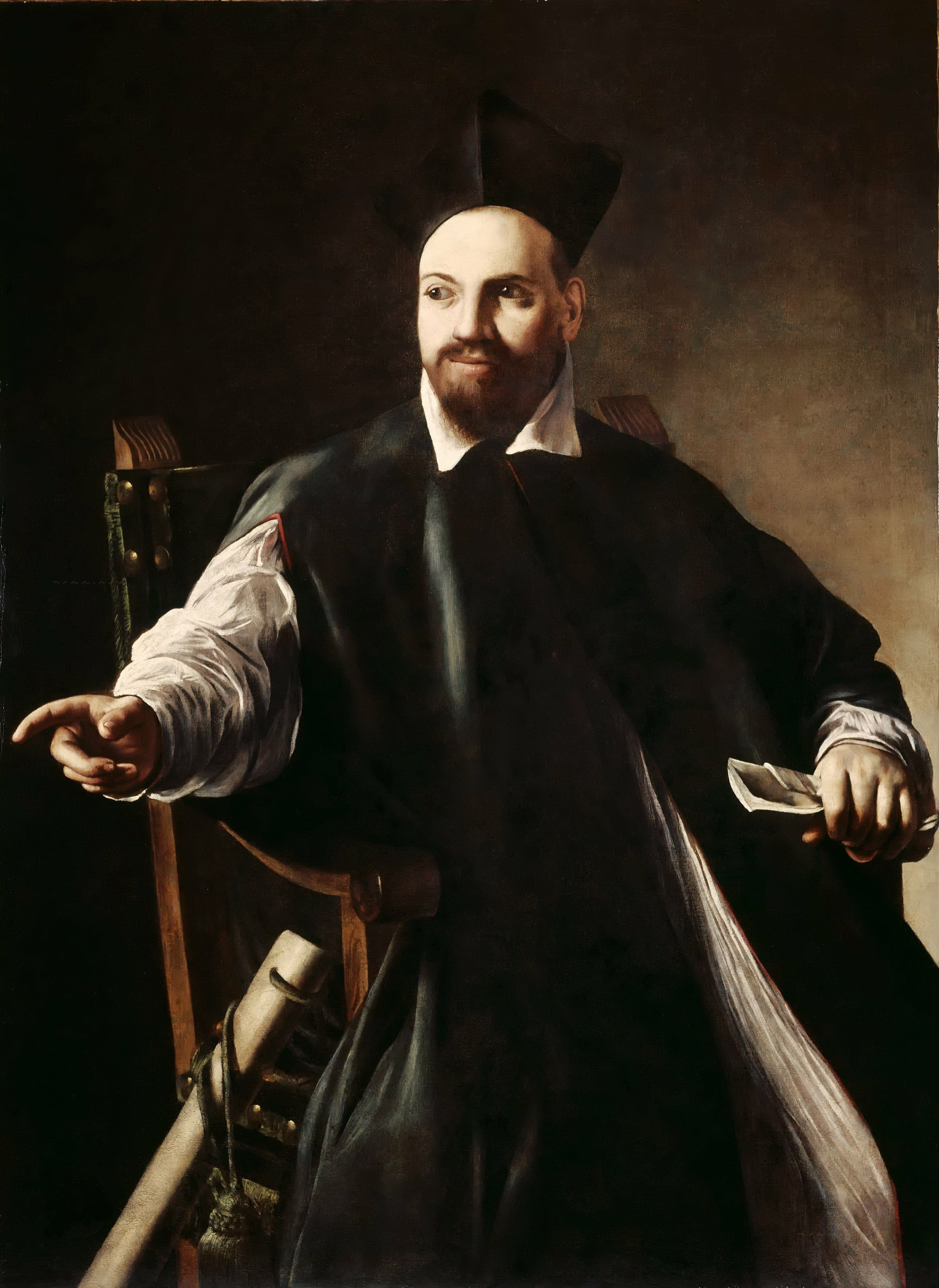
- Artist: Caravaggio
- Year: c. 1598
- Medium: Oil on canvas
- Dimensions: 124 cm × 90 cm (49 in × 35 in)
- Location: Galleria Nazionale d'Arte Antica; Rome

The Portrait of Maffeo Barberini is a painting of c. 1598 by the Italian Baroque master Michelangelo Merisi da Caravaggio.

Barberini, 30 years old and from the eminent Florentine Barberini family, was a rapidly rising Church prelate, a friend of Caravaggio's patron Cardinal Francesco Maria del Monte, and himself a poet and patron of the arts. Barberini's support continued – in 1603 he commissioned a Sacrifice of Isaac from Caravaggio. In 1623 he became Pope as Urban VIII.

First cataloged in 1963 by Roberto Longhi, one of Italy's foremost 20th-century art historians, the portrait had been in a private collection for decades, largely inaccessible to scholars, and had not been featured in any of the major Caravaggio exhibitions. In November 2024, it went on display at the Palazzo Barberini in Rome. In March 2026, after a year of negotiations with its Florentine owners, it was purchased by the Italian state for €30 million; this is said to be one of the largest sums ever paid by the state for a single artwork. The painting is now part of the permanent collection of the Galleria Nazionale d'Arte Antica at Palazzo Barberini.

== See also ==
- List of paintings by Caravaggio
