= 1597 in art =

Events from the year 1597 in art.

== Works ==
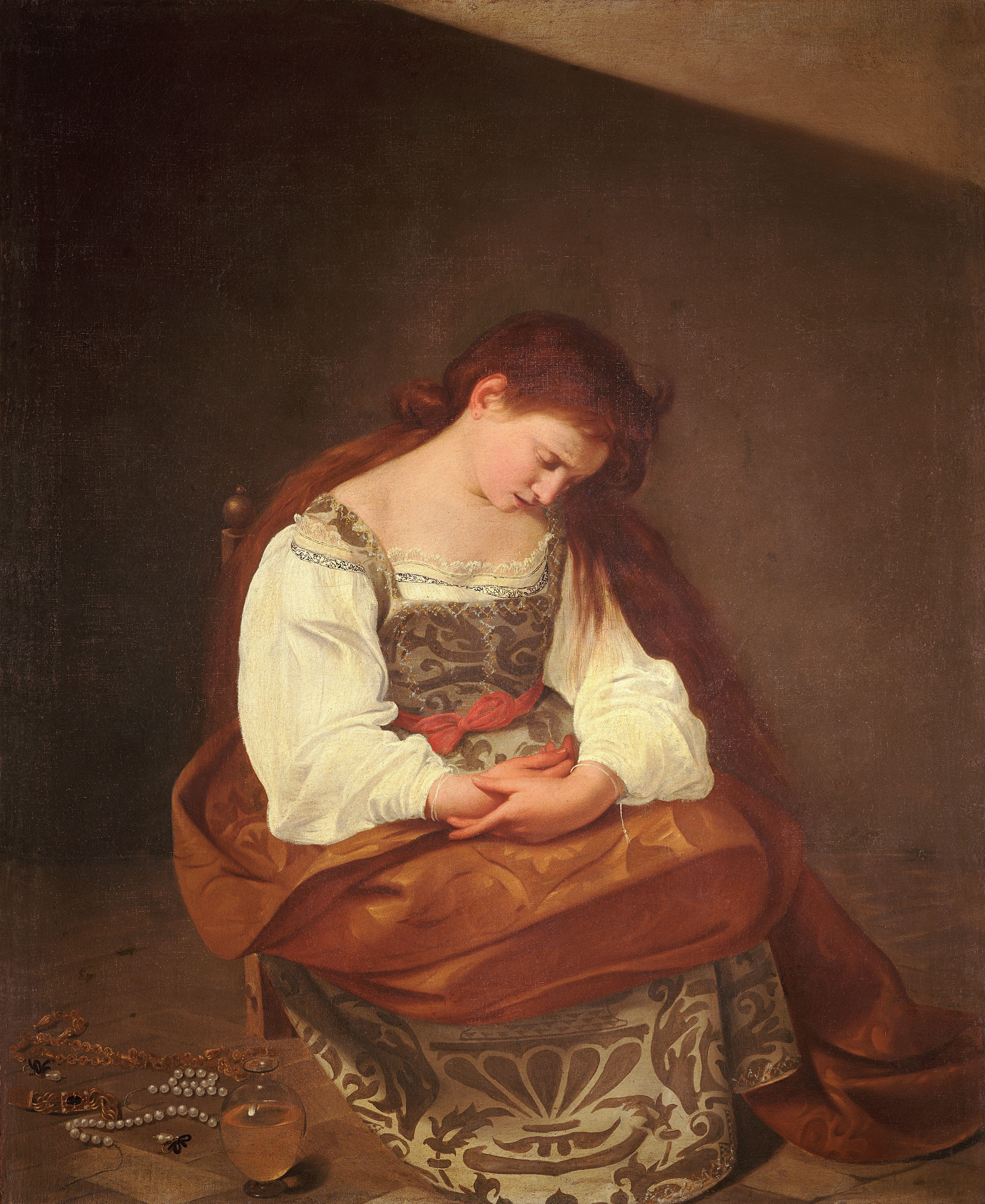
Caravaggio, Penitent Magdalene

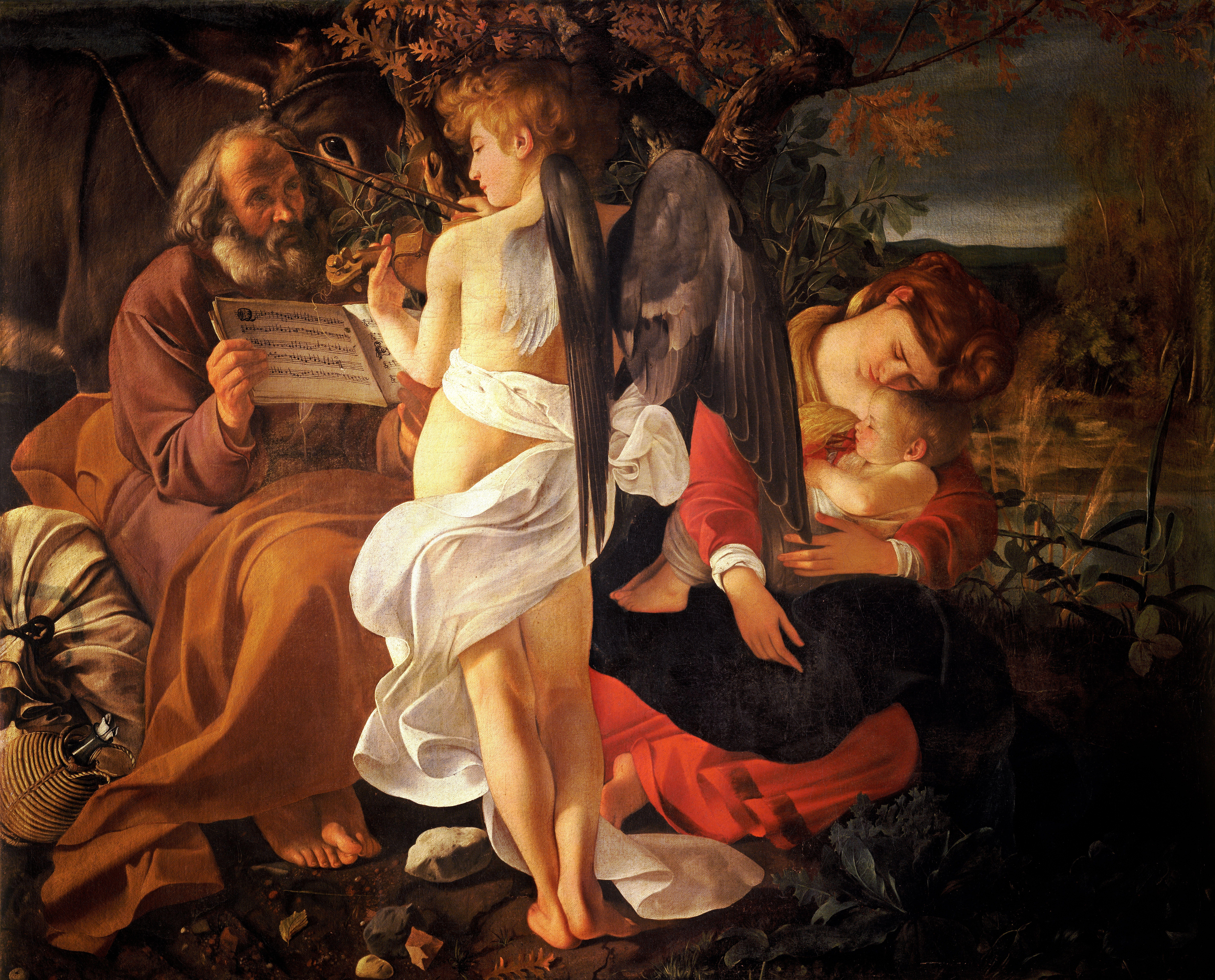
Caravaggio, Rest on the Flight into Egypt

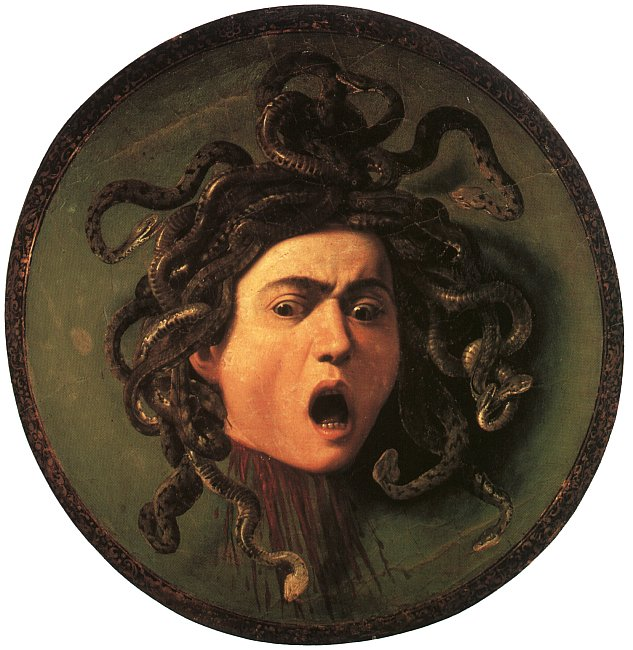
Caravaggio, Medusa

Caravaggio, Jupiter, Neptune and Pluto

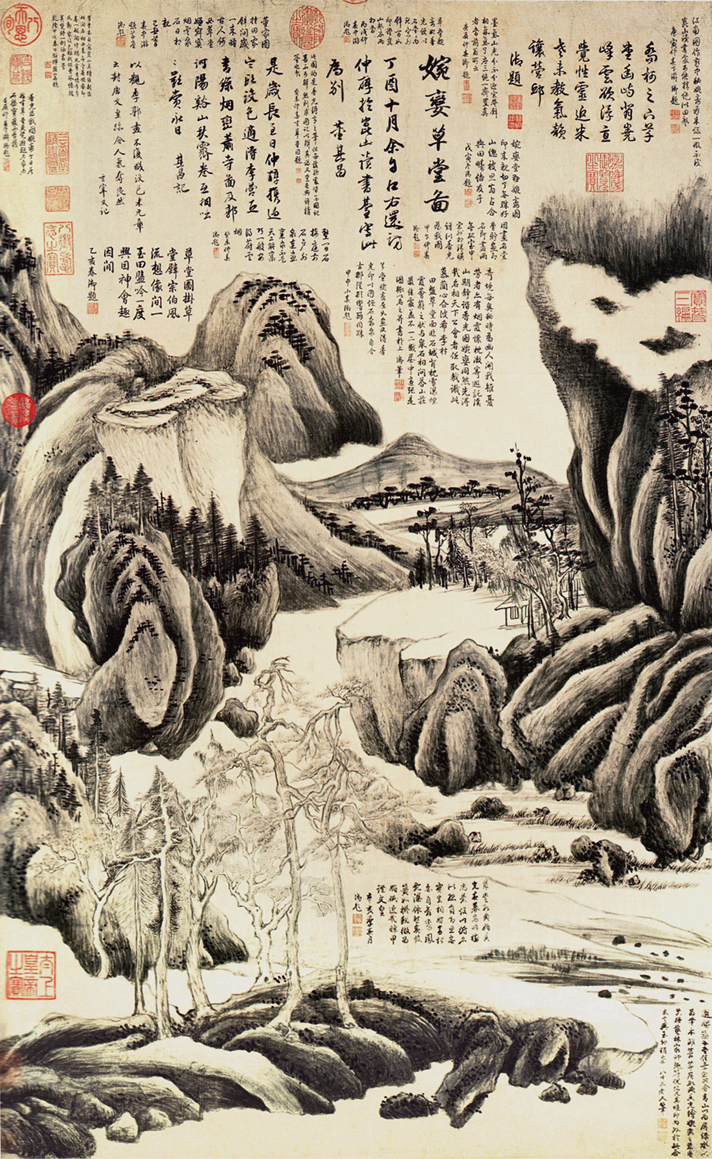
Dong Qichang, Wanluan Thatched Hall
- Federico Barocci - Nativity (Museo del Prado)
- Caravaggio
  - Penitent Magdalene
  - Rest on the Flight into Egypt
  - Medusa (second version)
  - Jupiter, Neptune and Pluto (Villa Ludovisi, Rome)
- Dong Qichang - Wanluan Thatched Hall
- Marcus Gheeraerts the Younger - Robert Devereux, 2nd Earl of Essex, in Garter robes (approximate date)
- El Greco - The Saint Joseph and the Christ Child (including a view of Toledo, Spain)
- Christ Pantocrator together with the twelve apostles, above the entrance gate of the Holy Virgin main church in the Rohzen Monastery, Bulgaria

== Births ==
- February 2 - Jacob van Campen, Dutch artist and architect of the Golden Age (died 1657)
- March 10 - Ercole Gennari, Italian Renaissance drawer and painter (died 1658)
- June 9 - Pieter Jansz Saenredam, Dutch painter of structures, architectural portraitist (died 1665)
- July 2 - Theodoor Rombouts, Flemish painter (died 1637)
- September 28 - Justus Sustermans, Flemish painter in the Baroque style (died 1681)
- date unknown
  - Claude Audran the Elder, French engraver (died 1677)
  - Orfeo Boselli, Italian sculptor working in Rome (died 1667)
  - Salomon de Bray (or Braij), Dutch painter (died 1664)
  - Pedro de Obregón, Spanish painter and printmaker (died 1659)
  - Henricus Hondius II, Dutch engraver, cartographer and publisher (died 1651)
  - Juan Ribalta, Spanish painter (died 1628)
  - Xiang Shengmo, Chinese painter in the Qing Dynasty (died 1658)
- probable
  - Jan van Bijlert, Dutch painter, co-founder of the Bentvueghels (died 1671)
  - Pieter Claesz, Dutch still life painter (died 1660)
  - Giacomo di Castro, Italian painter (died 1687)
  - Ludovico Lana, Italian painter, mainly active in Modena (died 1646)
  - Johann Liss, German-born painter (died c. 1631)

== Deaths ==
- February 2 - Lucas van Valckenborch, Flemish landscape painter (b. c.1535)
- September 28 - Hendrick van den Broeck, Flemish painter active mainly in Rome (born 1519)
- date unknown
  - Giovanni Battista de'Cavalieri, Italian engraver (born 1526)
  - Prospero Fontana, Italian painter of the late Renaissance (born 1512)
  - Francesco Morandini, Italian painter active in Florence (born 1544)
  - Willem Thibaut, Dutch Golden Age painter (born 1524)
