= Girolamo Alibrandi =

Italian painter

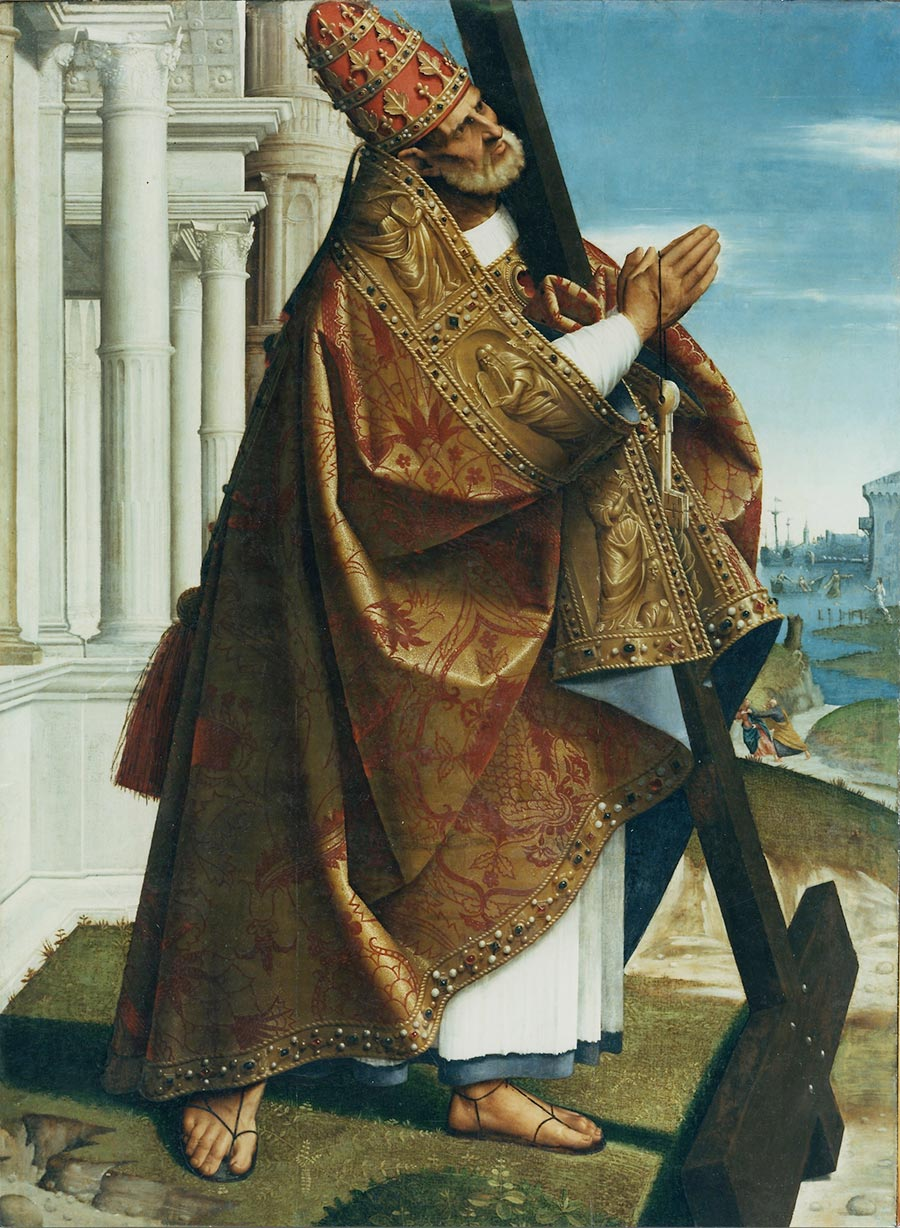
Saint Peter, Regional Museum of Messina

Girolamo Alibrandi (1470-1524), was an Italian painter, born and active in Sicily, called the Raphael of Messina (il Raffaello di Messina).

== Biography ==
Alibrandi received his first instruction in the school of the Antonj. The fame which Antonello da Messina, his countryman, had acquired in Venice, induced him to visit that city. While there he received for a short time instruction from Antonello. He also enjoyed the friendship of Giorgione. Alibrandi afterwards went to Milan, where he became a disciple of Leonardo da Vinci. Alibrandi then went to Rome and studied the antique artifacts and the works of Raphael. From Rome he went to Parma, and thence back to Messina, where the town possesses his best works.

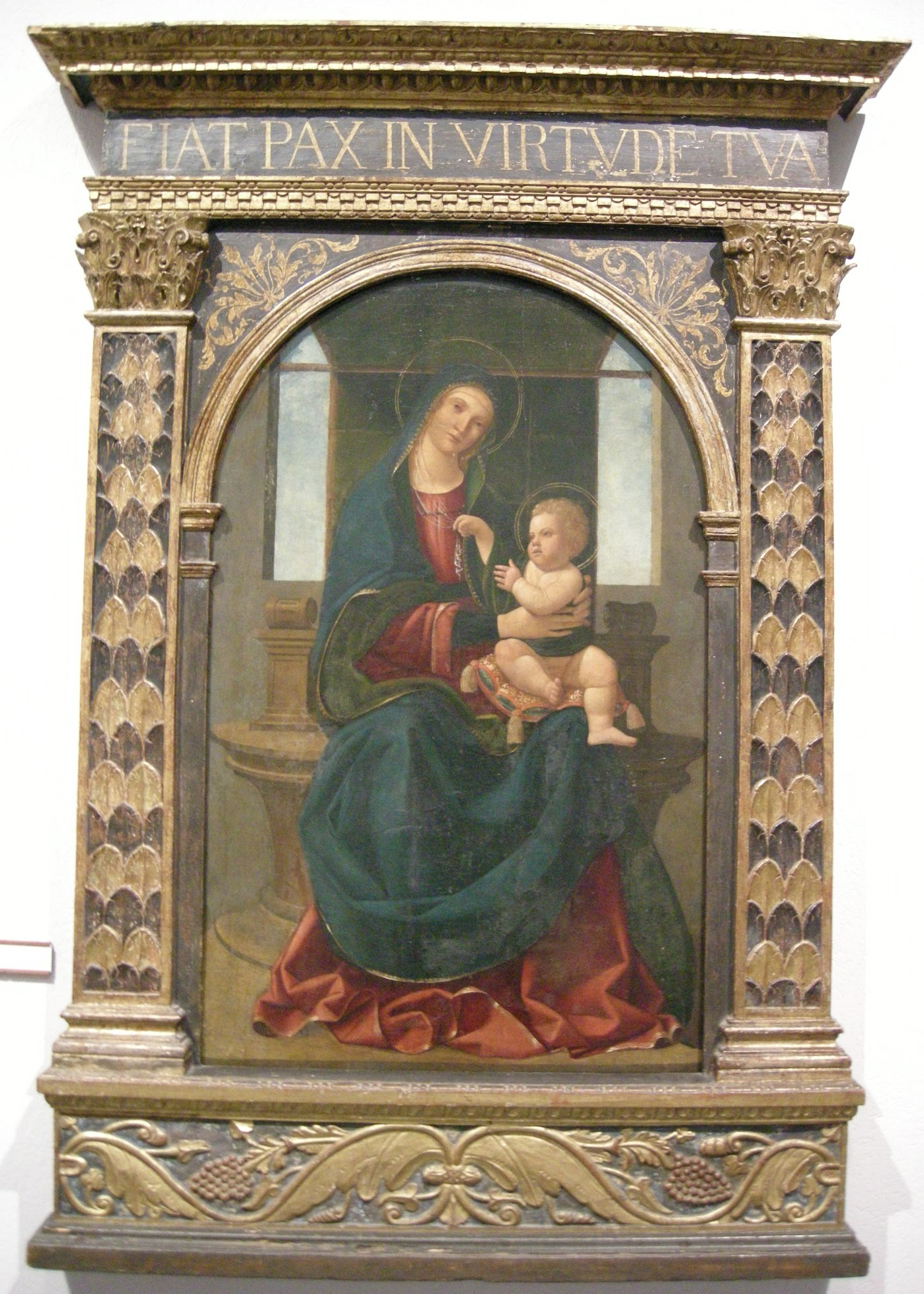
Enthroned Madonna with Child, now in the Museo Regionale di Messina

His most important of work was a large picture of the Presentation in the Temple, painted in 1519 for the Chiesa della Candelora. It was later transferred into the church of San Nicolò dei Gentiluomini, and then, following severe damage in the earthquake of 1908, to the collection of the Museo Civico in Messina, where it remains. He also painted a Purification of the Virgin now in the Cathedral of Messina. Alibrando died of the plague in 1524 at Messina.
