= Jacob van Laethem =

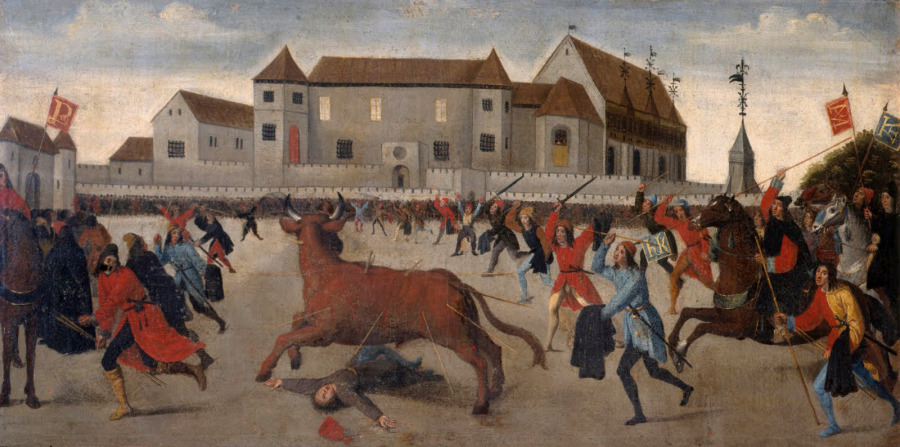
Bullfight in Benavente in honor of Philip the Fair by Jacob van Laethem, private collection, 1506

Jacob van Laethem, also Jacques van Lathem or Laethem, (1470–1528) was a Flemish painter of the Early Netherlandish painting era.

== Early life ==
Jacob Van Lathem was the second son of the miniaturist Lieven van Lathem. He probably received his training from his father and from 1490 to 1493 he was employed by John II of Portugal. In 1493 he joined the Guild of Saint Luke in Antwerp and in 1494 he was appointed by Philip the Fair as "valet de chambre et peintre Monsignor". He was often involved in the decoration of churches and palaces, and thus worked equally well in Ghent, Brussels and Antwerp, but also in Spain, where he accompanied his clients on several trips.

== Travel ==
He accompanied Philip the Fair on his trip to Spain from 1502 to 1503, also, from the documentation it appears that his brother Lieven van Lathem the Younger, the goldsmith, was part of the company. In 1506, he accompanied Philip again when traveling to Spain to be recognized as king consort of Castile. After the death of Philip on September 25, 1506 in Burgos, Jacob returned to the Netherlands. There he was in the service of Maximilian I, Holy Roman Emperor, and he worked for the court of Margaret of Austria, Duchess of Savoy. From 1517-1520 he accompanied Charles V, Holy Roman Emperor on his trip to Spain. From 1522 to 1528 he went again with Charles V for the last time to Spain.

== Works ==
Jacob van Laethem seems to have been involved in major projects of ceremonial decoration. In 1497 for instance, he was responsible for the decoration of the church Paleis op de Koudenberg on the occasion of the requiem masses sung in memory of John of Aragon, the Crown Prince of Aragon and Castile. Three years later in 1500, he worked as a decorator at the ceremonies at the death of Albert III, Duke of Saxony, was involved in the decoration of the Saint Bavo Cathedral in Ghent, then St. Janskerk, for the celebration of the baptism of Charles V on 7 March 1500, and executed a manuscript for Maximilian I. There have been preserved in the Écaussinnes-Lalaing Castle four works that would have been donated by the Spanish court. The subjects of the works are:

- Meeting of Philip the Fair and Ferdinand II of Aragon in Remesal
- A bullfight in Benavente
- A "juego de cañas" in Valladolid
- The funeral of Philip the Fair in Burgos

There are a number of his portraits also found in the Rijksmuseum in Amsterdam, Windsor Castle and the Royal Museums of Fine Arts of Belgium.
