= Giovanni Battista Fontana (painter) =

Italian painter

Giovanni Battista Fontana (1524 – 25 September 1587) was an Italian painter and engraver.

Fontana's training made use of the paintings of masters such as Titian and Veronese. His artistic output in Austria, which is recorded from 1562, included major work on altarpieces, with countless sketches and engravings. With the assistance of his brother, Giulio Fontana, he painted frescoes in the chapel of Schloß Kaiser-Ebersdorf in Vienna in 1562.

Fontana was born at Ala near Verona, then part of the Republic of Venice, but settled in Innsbruck, County of Tyrol in 1573. In 1575, he was appointed court painter to Ferdinand II, Archduke of Austria. He worked on frescoes for the oratory of the Hofkirche, the Spheristerion in 1573, the Silberne Kapelle, which had been built by Giulio Fontana and where he painted 14 scenes of the Passion in 1576 and lastly decorated a castle chamber in 1578.

Between 1583 and 1584, he set to work on the ceiling of the dining hall of Schloss Ambras, depicting Allegories of the Zodiac, the Elements and the Planets.

He died in Innsbruck.

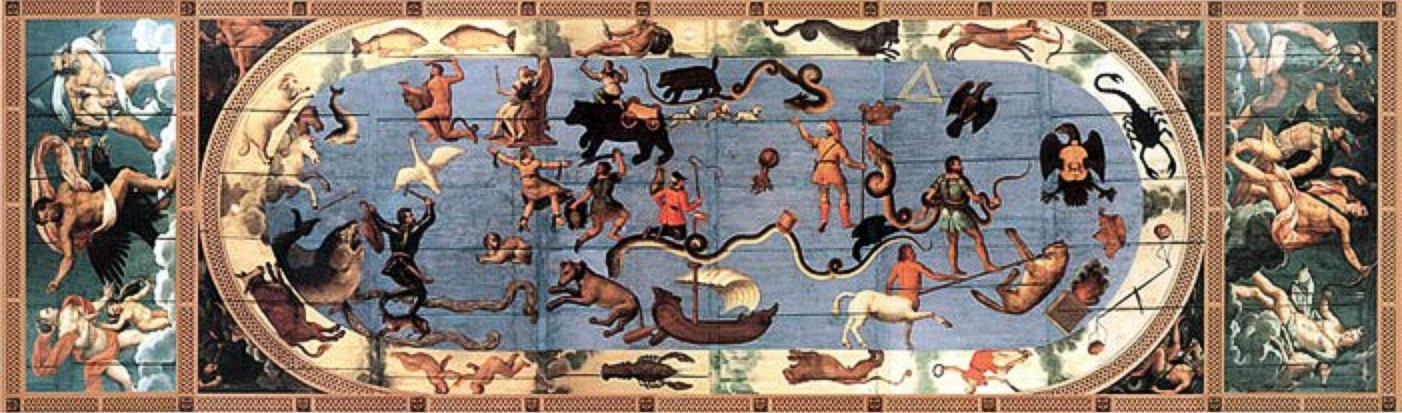
Ceiling frescoes from Schloss Ambras.
