= Giovanni Anastasi (painter) =

Italian painter

- Born: 20 March 1653; Senigallia, Italy
- Died: 13 March 1704 (aged 50); Macerata, Italy
- Known for: Painting
- Notable work: Painting of Saint James, Miracles of St Phillip, Glory of Saint Ursula, frescoes in the Cloister of San Nicola in Tolentino
- Movement: Religious and history painting

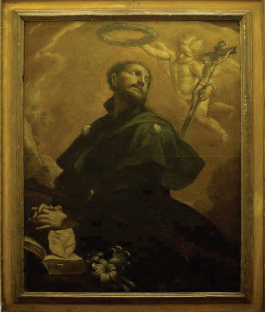
Painting of Saint James by Anastasi

Giovani Anastasi (Senigallia, 20 March 1653 – Macerata, 13 March 1704) was an Italian painter, mainly of religious and history paintings.
