= Conservation-restoration of Leonardo da Vinci's The Last Supper =

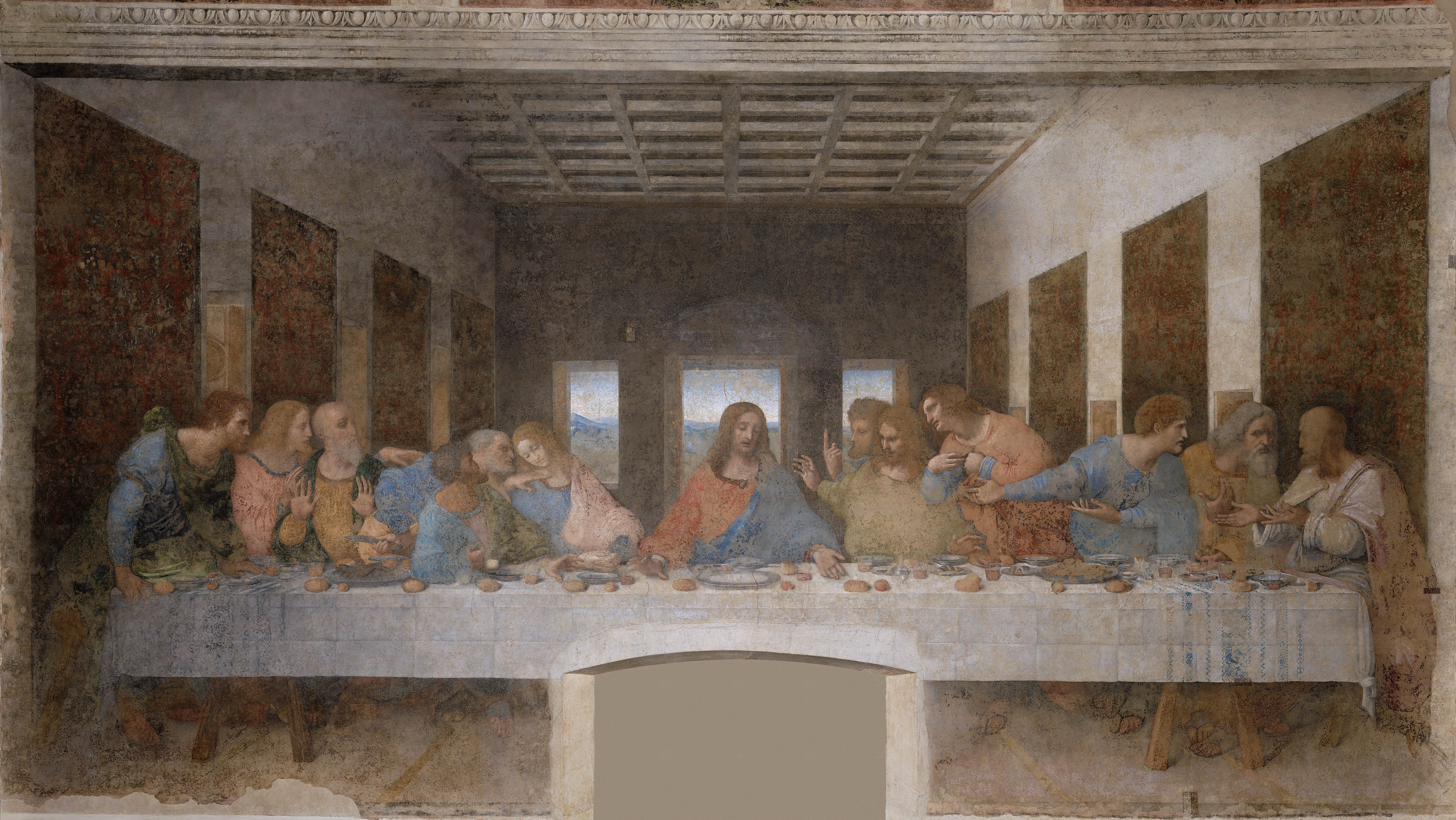
Depictions of the Last Supper in Christian art have been undertaken by artistic masters for centuries, Leonardo da Vinci's late 1490s mural painting in Milan, Italy, being the best-known example.

Work on the conservation and restoration of Leonardo da Vinci's The Last Supper mural, much of it more harmful than helpful, has been carried out over many centuries, and continues. Completed in the late 15th century by the Renaissance artist Leonardo da Vinci, the mural is located in the refectory of the Convent of Santa Maria delle Grazie, Milan, Italy. The Last Supper was commissioned by Ludovico Sforza, Duke of Milan in 1495, as part of a series of renovations to the convent with the intention that the location would become the Sforza family mausoleum. Painting began in 1495 and continued until 1498.

The scene is understood to depict the Bible verse John 13:22, showing the reactions of the Twelve Disciples at the Last Supper to Jesus's announcement that one among them will betray him.

== Techniques and materials used ==
When he received the commission for The Last Supper, Leonardo da Vinci had never worked on a piece of this great a size, fifteen feet high by almost twenty-nine feet wide. He also had very limited experience working in the technique known as fresco, mixing pigment into wet plaster to create a permanent bond. Traditionally, fresco painters applied many successive layers of plaster before and during the painting process. This method requires fresco painters to work quickly and with a pre-set plan. However, this is not how Leonardo worked, and for this reason, he chose a new technique of putting a mixture of oil and tempera paints onto a dry wall. According to Ross King, "In essence, [Leonardo] took tempera paints and mixed emulsifying oils into them." This allowed Leonardo to include richer colors and finer details, without the need to work very fast.

Leonardo da Vinci first covered the wall with plaster. He then added a thin layer of calcium carbonate, magnesium, and animal glue to aid in binding. After this, Leonardo added a primer coat of lead white, commonly used in Renaissance-era paintings, but rarely used in frescoes. Large quantities of lead white in frescoes can be highly toxic, and as it oxidizes to lead dioxide it turns brownish. Leonardo used red chalk and black paint on top of the lead white to sketch out his image, before adding countless layers of mixed pigments. Leonardo used a series of translucent glazes to finish the frescoes.

== Deterioration ==
By 1517, Leonardo da Vinci's The Last Supper had already started to deteriorate, as was noted in many diaries and letters of the time. The corrosion of the work can be accredited to Leonardo's unconventional painting technique for a work on a wall, as well as the surface itself. The refectory of Santa Maria delle Grazie sits in a low-lying part of the city, prone to flooding and damp. The surface on which Leonardo painted is an exterior wall and would have absorbed moisture. The painting was also exposed to the steam and smoke from the convent's kitchen and from candles used in the refectory itself. By 1582, it was recorded that The Last Supper was "in a state of total ruin."

Around 1652, a door was cut into the refectory wall, destroying the area in which Jesus's feet were depicted.

In 1796, French forces, under the orders of Napoleon, took control of Milan and used the refectory of Santa Maria delle Grazie as their stables. 1800 brought a flood that filled the refectory with two feet of water for 15 days. The walls absorbed moisture, leading to a thick green mold covering the entire painting.

An English writer wrote in 1847 that the work "will never more be seen by the eye of man...The greater part is perished for ever." Author Henry James later wrote, "[The Last Supper is] the saddest work of art in the world."

The Last Supper was almost completely lost on August 16, 1943, at the height of World War II in Italy, when a Royal Air Force bomb struck Santa Maria delle Grazie, destroying the roof of the refectory and demolishing other nearby spaces. The Last Supper had been protected by sandbags, mattresses, and pillows, saving it from destruction. However, the work was exposed to the elements while the roof and walls were being reconstructed.

== Restoration and conservation attempts ==
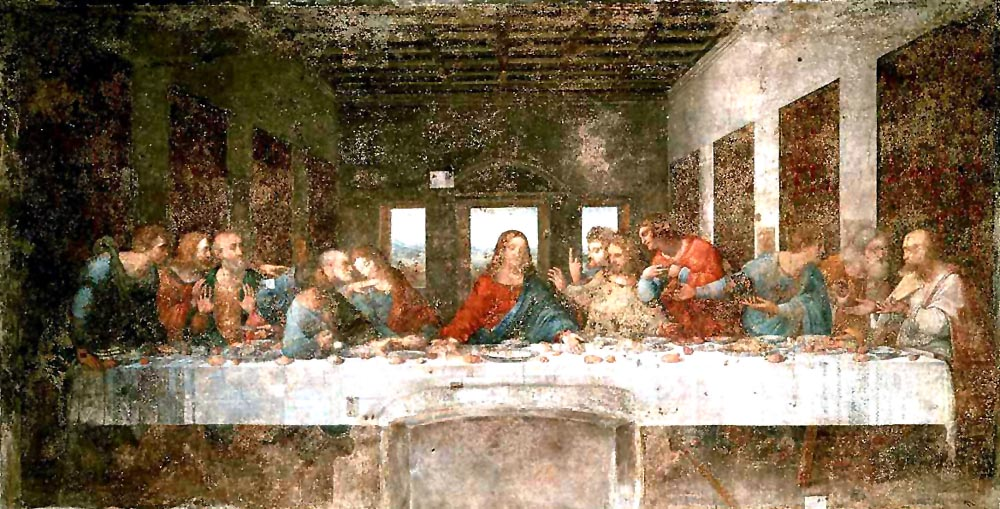
Leonardo da Vinci's The Last Supper, circa 1975.

=== 1700s ===
==== Michelangelo Bellotti ====
In 1726, the first recorded restoration attempt of The Last Supper began. The members of the convent hired Michelangelo Bellotti, a painter, to work on the piece. After filling in the cracked and peeling areas with new tempera paint, Bellotti covered the work with a layer of oil. Due to this, most of the original paint was hidden under his restoration and led to Bellotti being called a "man very deficient in skill and knowledge".

==== Giuseppe Mazza ====
Giuseppe Mazza was hired by the priests of Santa Maria delle Grazie in 1770, to work on restoring and conserving The Last Supper. Mazza attempted to remove Michelangelo Bellotti's additions by using an iron scraping tool, then filling in areas with an oil paint mixture and repainting the work as he chose. Thinking the work was a true fresco, he also washed the wall with a sodium hydroxide solution. This led to his being fired from the restoration job, and the removal to another convent of the priest who had hired him.

=== 1800s ===
==== Stefano Barezzi ====
In 1821, Stefano Barezzi, convinced that The Last Supper was a conventional fresco, attempted to remove the work from the refectory wall. After realizing his mistake, Barezzi attempted to glue the removed paint back onto the wall. Barezzi also added areas of colored stucco.

Between 1853 and 1855, Stefano Barezzi was again hired to work on The Last Supper. During this conservation attempt, Barezzi cleaned the entire surface of the work, as well as removing plaster above the piece, revealing lunettes painted by Leonardo da Vinci depicting the coats of arms of Leonardo's patron, Ludovico Sforza and his sons, Maximilian and Francesco.

=== 1900s ===
==== Luigi Cavenaghi ====
The 20th century brought advancements in scientific technologies that were used in the restoration and conservation of The Last Supper. The first person to conduct an analysis of the painting’s chemical components was Luigi Cavenaghi, in 1908. From this analysis, Cavenaghi concluded that the painting was completed in tempera paint, on two layers of plaster.

==== Oreste Silvestri ====
In 1924, the Italian painter Oreste Silvestri led the task of cleaning Leonardo's work, as well as applying new plaster to the edges of the painting.

==== Mauro Pelliccioli ====
Mauro Pelliccioli completed three separate sessions of restoration and conservation work on The Last Supper. In 1947, Pelliccioli was appointed to complete a cleaning "to be done more radically than the previous work by Cavenaghi and Silvestri." Pelliccioli attempted to rebind the paint to the wall's surface by brushing shellac over the paint and injecting casein behind. This attempt, according to Pietro Marani, "restored the paint its cohesion, consistency and bright colours."

Between 1951 and 1952 and again in 1954, Pelliccioli concentrated on reversing the work completed during the 18th century and restoring the piece to its earliest state. During these cleanings, Pelliccioli revealed many of Leonardo's original details, such as the Assisi embroidery design on the tablecloth and the gold lettering on Judas's robe.

==== Pinin Brambilla Barcilon ====
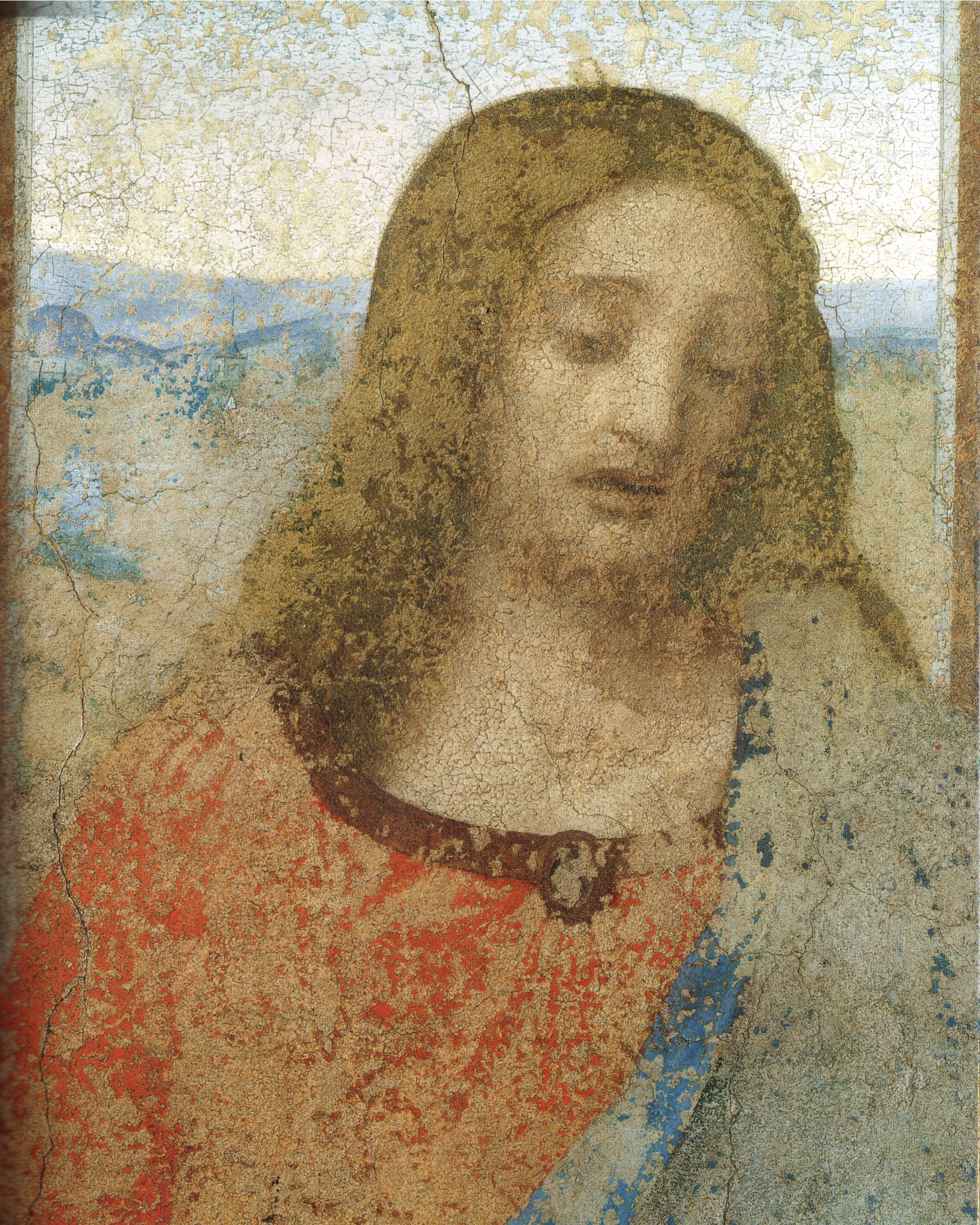
Detail of the head of Jesus, after the restoration completed in 1999.

The Superintendent for Artistic and Historical Heritage in Milan ordered a complete examination of Leonardo's work in 1976. This examination included sonar and radar tests, core samples of the wall, infrared cameras, and x-rays. The Superintendent appointed Pinin Brambilla Barcilon, a respected art restorer, to oversee a full restoration. During this restoration, steps were taken to carefully remove dirt and grime before starting to reverse past restoration attempts. The restoration team removed the numerous layers of shellac, paint, and oils using "solvent applied with tiny blotters of Japanese paper." Areas that were too damaged or unrecognizable were filled in with light watercolor paints, so as not to detract from the blank areas. One of the major discoveries during this renovation was a tiny pinhole that marked Leonardo’s vanishing point, or point of perspective. This renovation lasted for 21 years, until May 28, 1999.

The former refectory was converted into a climate-controlled, sealed room to help counteract the environmental hazards that could lead to further deterioration. Since then visitors are required to pass through several pollution and humidity filtration chambers before entering to see the painting, and are only allowed to remain for 15 to 20 minutes.

== See also ==
- List of works by Leonardo da Vinci
