= Giovanni Donato da Montorfano =

Italian painter

Giovanni Donato da Montorfano (c. 1460–1502/03) was an Italian painter of the Renaissance who was born, lived, and worked in Milan.

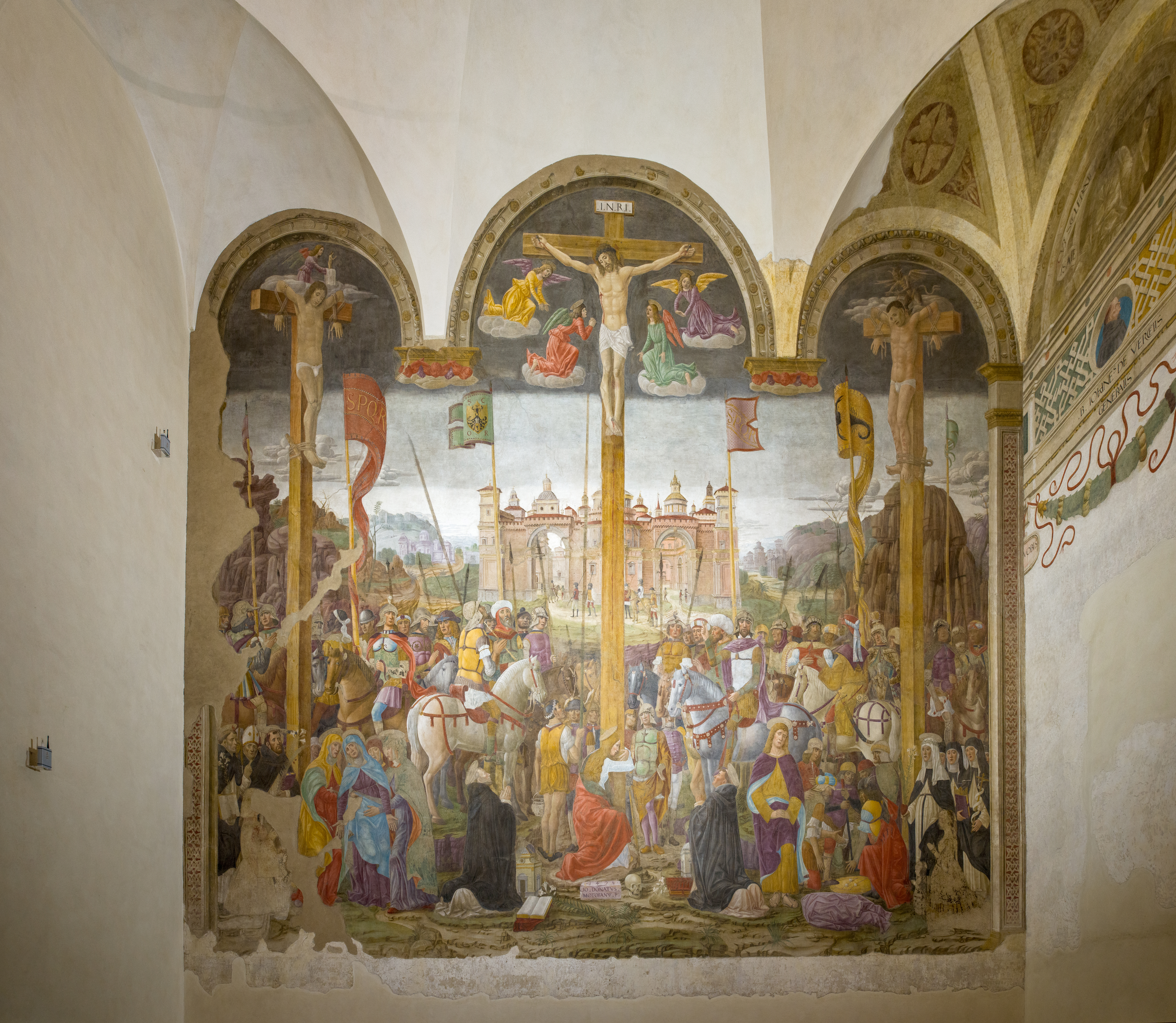
Crucifixion, opposite Leonardo's Last Supper

Giovanni Donato comes from a family of painters. His grandfather, Abramo, and father, Alberto da Montorfano worked in the Milan Cathedral as painters and were members of the Milan painter's guild. Both Giovanni Donato and his brother Vincenzo were pupils of their father.

Giovanni Donato is best known for his fresco depicting the Crucifixion (1495) in the refectory of the convent of Santa Maria delle Grazie in Milan. It is painted on the wall facing Leonardo da Vinci's masterpiece of The Last Supper. This fresco is said to have some of the figures of the Duke and his family painted by Leonardo.

Giovanni Battista da Montorfano is documented as part of a team of artists, including Vincenzo Foppa and Cristoforo Moretti forming an estimate for the paintings of Stefano dei Fedeli in a chapel of the Castle of Milan.
