= The Crowning with Thorns (Titian, Paris) =

1542-43 painting by Titian

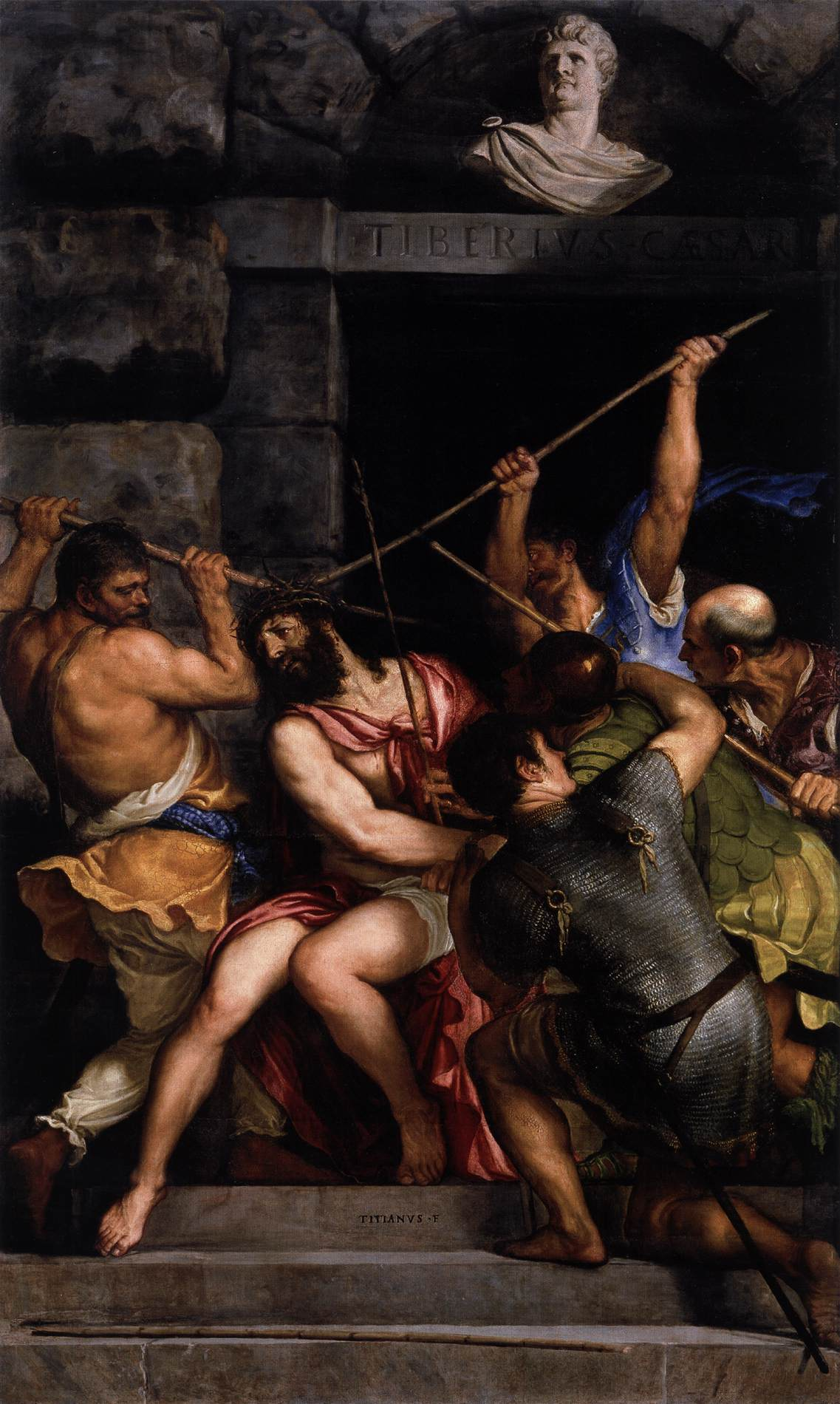
- Artist: Titian
- Year: 1542-1543
- Medium: oil on canvas
- Dimensions: 303 cm × 180 cm (119 in × 71 in)
- Location: Musée du Louvre, Paris

The Crowning with Thorns is a painting by the Italian Renaissance master Titian (Tiziano Vecellio) done during 1542 and 1543. It is housed in the Musée du Louvre, in Paris.

The painting was commissioned by the confraternity of Santa Maria delle Grazie in Milan. It was brought to France after the Napoleonic conquest of the city in 1797.

The space of the painting is compressed by the arrangement the figures on a shallow plane, delimited by the wall of a building. There are explicit references to antiquity: the figure of Christ derives from the celebrated Laocoön, an antique statue discovered in Rome in 1506, an archetypal exemplum doloris ("example of pain"). Another famous antique sculptural fragment, the Belvedere Torso, provides the model for the upper body of the torturer on the left. With the inclusion of the bust of Emperor Tiberius, a direct reference to the Roman authorities who condemned Christ, Titian also pays homage to the classical past.

This is a brutal scene, in which Christ's tormentors twist the crown onto his head with their canes, but the violence is relieved and Christ's suffering exalted by the beauty of the colours, which especially in the blue and green to the right are colder than usual in deference to Titian's Roman sources. In Christ's foot extended on the steps, however, Titian pulls out all the Venetian stops and one can sense the blood flowing through the veins under the flesh. The pattern of the canes slices through the massed figures like the strokes of a knife, forming a Trinitarian triangle to the right of Christ's head. An inimitable Titian touch is the cane lying unused on the foremost step, still, shadowless and deadly, like a snake.

According to Robert Haven Schauffler, the German painter Fritz von Uhde once considered it to be "the greatest picture ever painted."

== See also ==
- List of works by Titian
