= The Last Supper (Leonardo) =

Mural painting by Leonardo da Vinci

Coordinates: 45°28′00″N 9°10′15″E

- Il Cenacolo (Italian), L'Ultima Cena
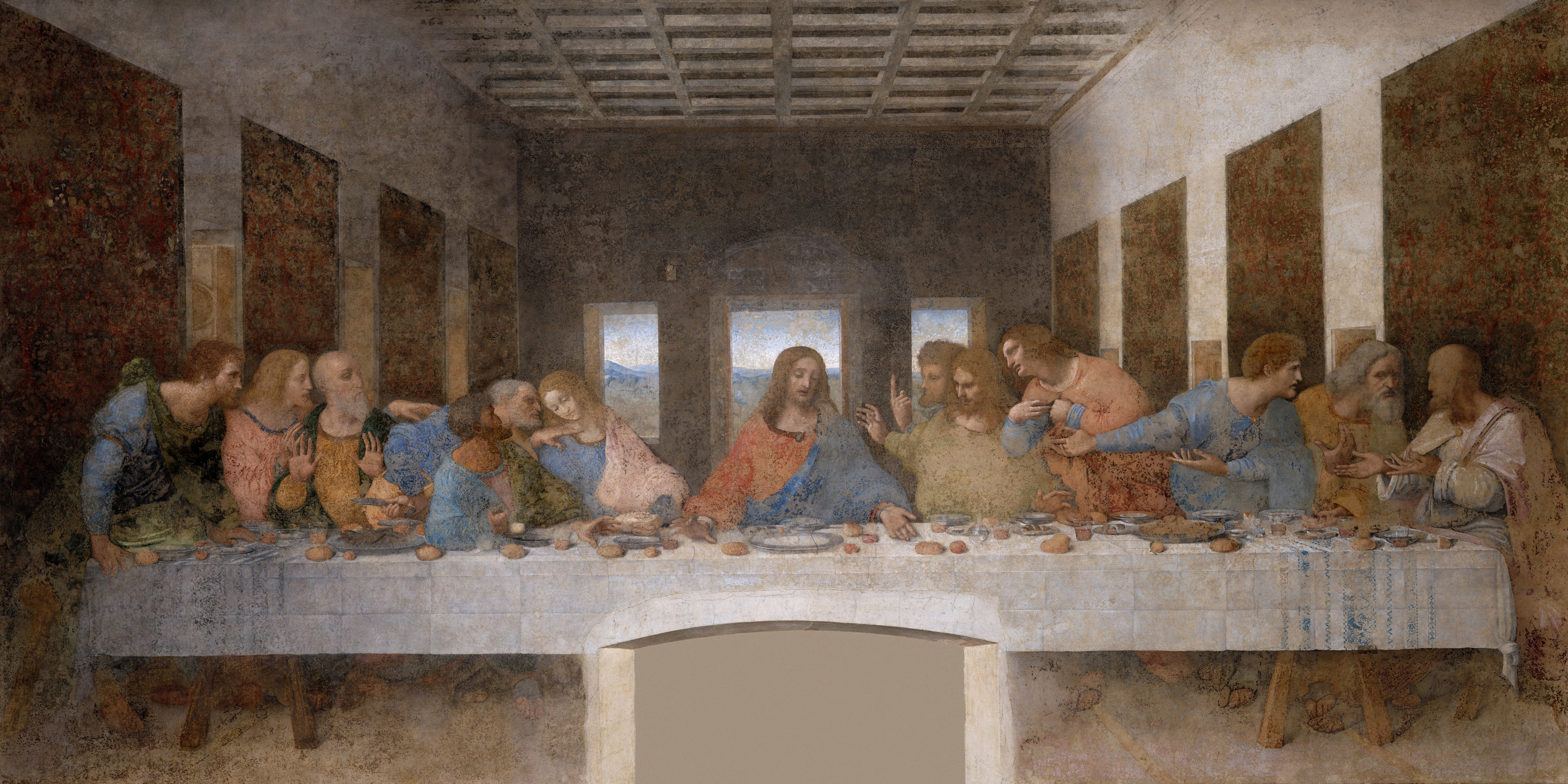
- From left to right: Bartholomew; James the Less; Andrew; Judas Iscariot, situated in front of Peter; Peter; and John. At center Jesus. Continuing: Thomas, situated behind James; James the Great; Philip; Matthew; Jude Thaddeus, or Jude; and Simon.
- Artist: Leonardo da Vinci
- Year: c. 1495–1498
- Medium: Tempera on gesso, pitch, and mastic, on wall plaster
- Movement: High Renaissance
- Subject: The Last Supper
- Dimensions: 460 cm × 880 cm (181 in × 346 in)
- Location: Santa Maria delle Grazie, Milan, Italy
- Website: cenacolovinciano.org/en/

The Last Supper (Italian: Il Cenacolo [il tʃeˈnaːkolo] or L'Ultima Cena [ˈlultima ˈtʃeːna]) is a mural painting by the Italian High Renaissance artist Leonardo da Vinci, dated to c. 1495–1498, housed in the refectory of the Convent of Santa Maria delle Grazie in Milan, Italy. The painting represents the scene of the Last Supper of Jesus with the Twelve Apostles, as it is told in the Gospel of John – specifically the moment after Jesus announces that one of his apostles will betray him. Its handling of space, mastery of perspective, treatment of motion and complex display of human emotion has made it one of the Western world's most recognizable paintings and among Leonardo's most celebrated works. Some commentators consider it pivotal in inaugurating the transition into what is now termed the High Renaissance.

The work was commissioned as part of a plan of renovations to the church and its convent buildings by Leonardo's patron Ludovico Sforza, Duke of Milan. In order to permit his inconsistent painting schedule and frequent revisions, it is painted with materials that allowed for regular alterations: tempera on gesso, pitch, and mastic. Due to the methods used, a variety of environmental factors, and intentional damage, little of the original painting remains today despite numerous restoration attempts, the last being completed in 1999. The Last Supper is Leonardo's largest work, aside from the Sala delle Asse.

== Painting ==
=== Commission and creation ===
The Last Supper measures 460 cm × 880 cm (15 ft 1 in × 28 ft 10 in) and covers an end wall of the dining hall at the monastery of Santa Maria delle Grazie in Milan, Italy. The theme was a traditional one for refectories, although the room was not a refectory at the time that Leonardo painted it. The main church building was still under construction while Leonardo was composing the painting. Leonardo's patron, Ludovico Sforza, planned that the church should be remodeled as a family mausoleum. To this end, changes were made, perhaps to plans by Donato Bramante. These plans were not fully carried out, and a smaller mortuary chapel was constructed, adjacent to the cloister. The painting was commissioned by Sforza to decorate the wall of the mausoleum. The lunettes above the main painting, formed by the triple arched ceiling of the refectory, are painted with Sforza coats-of-arms. The opposite wall of the refectory is covered by the Crucifixion fresco by Giovanni Donato da Montorfano, to which Leonardo added figures of the Sforza family in tempera; these figures have deteriorated in much the same way as has The Last Supper.

Leonardo worked on The Last Supper from about 1495 to 1498, but he did not work continuously. The beginning date is not certain, as the archives of the convent for the period have been destroyed. A document dated 1497 indicates that the painting was nearly completed at that date. A prior from the monastery reportedly complained to Leonardo about its delay. Leonardo wrote to the head of the monastery, explaining he had been struggling to find the perfect villainous face for Judas, and that if he could not find a face corresponding with what he had in mind, he would use the features of the prior who had complained.

In 1557, Gian Paolo Lomazzo wrote that Leonardo's friend Bernardo Zenale advised him to leave Christ's face unfinished, arguing that "it would be impossible to imagine faces lovelier or gentler than those of James the Greater or James the Less." Leonardo apparently took the advice.

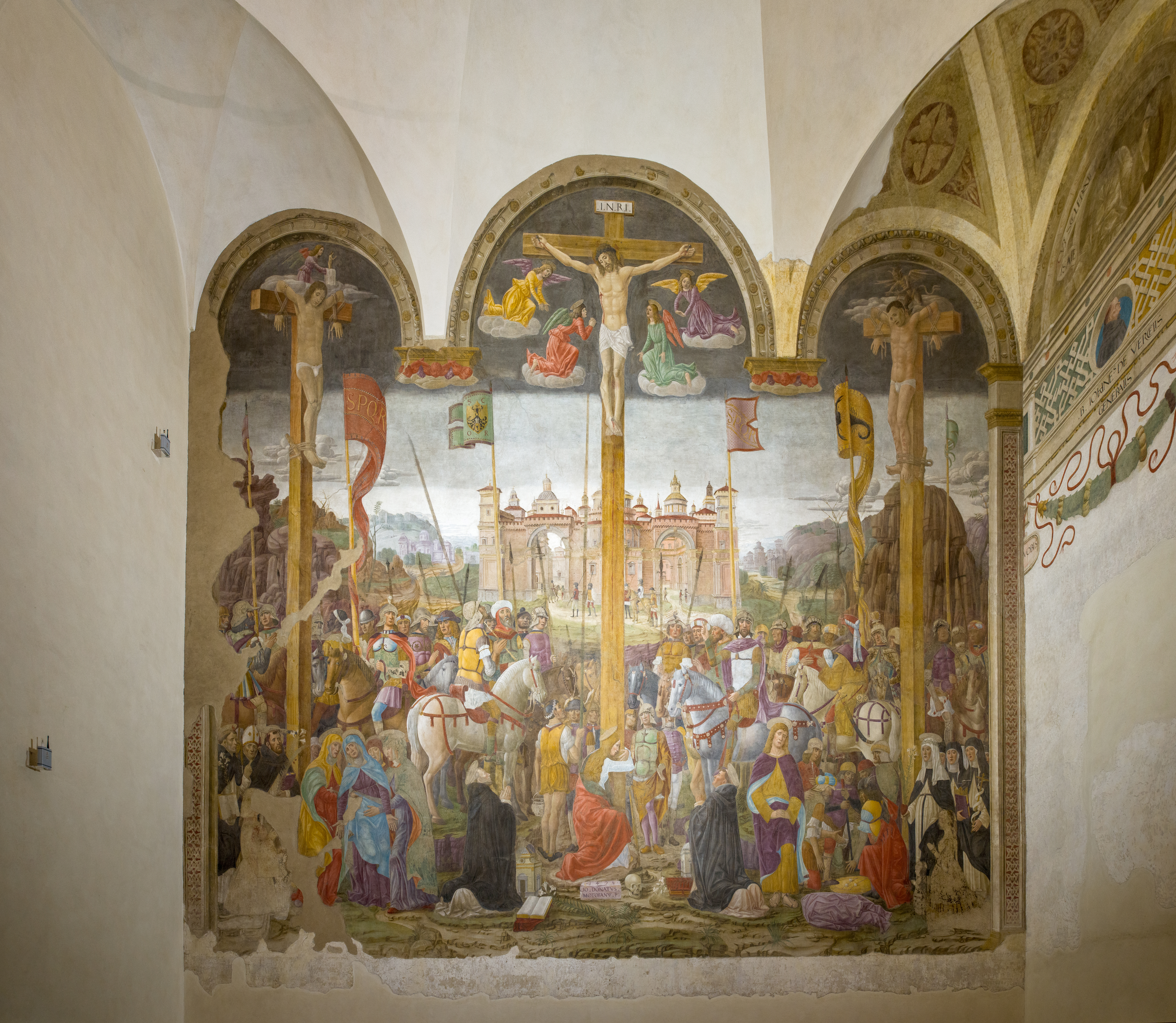
Crucifixion by Giovanni Donato da Montorfano, 1495, opposite Leonardo's Last Supper

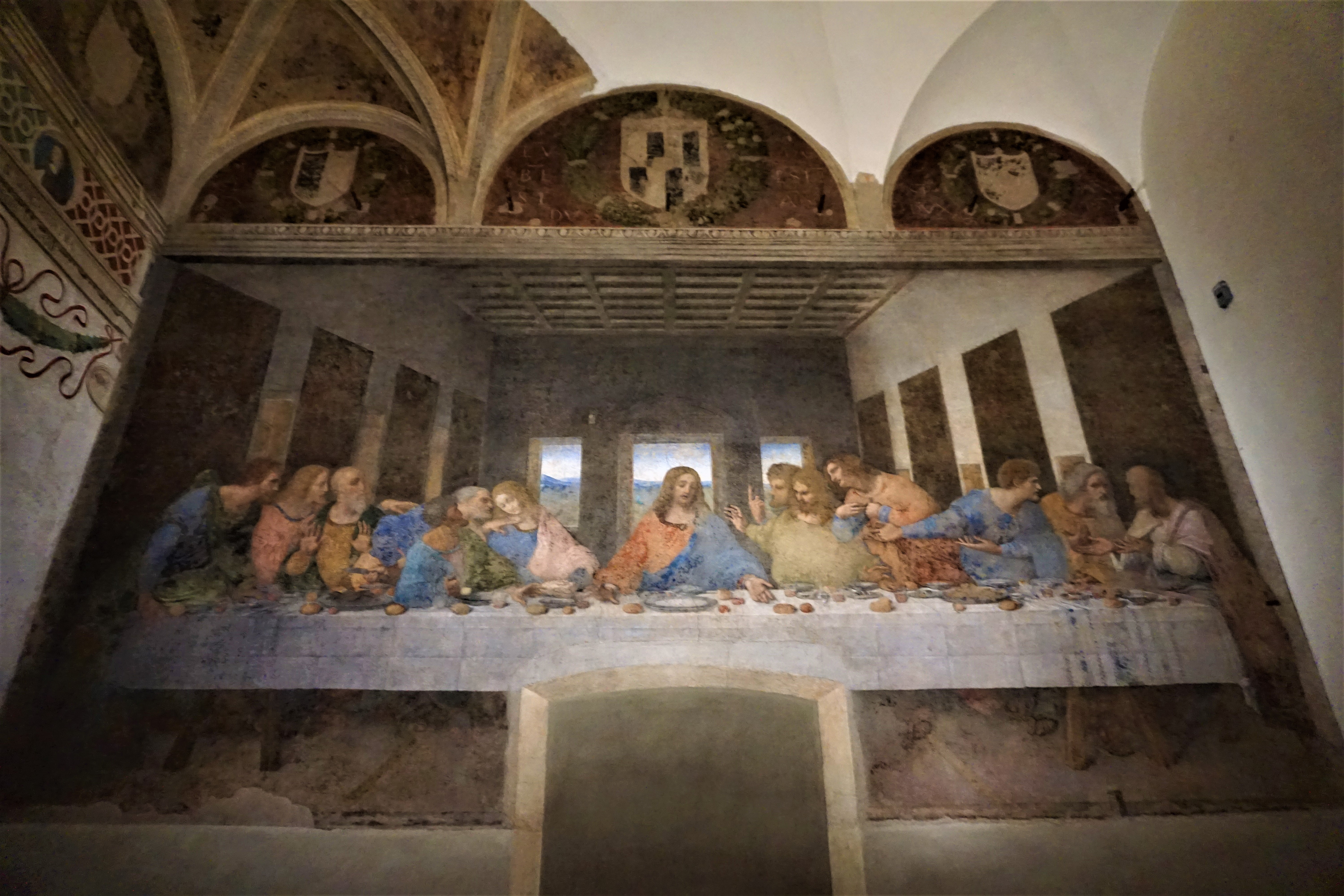
The painting as it appears on the refectory wall

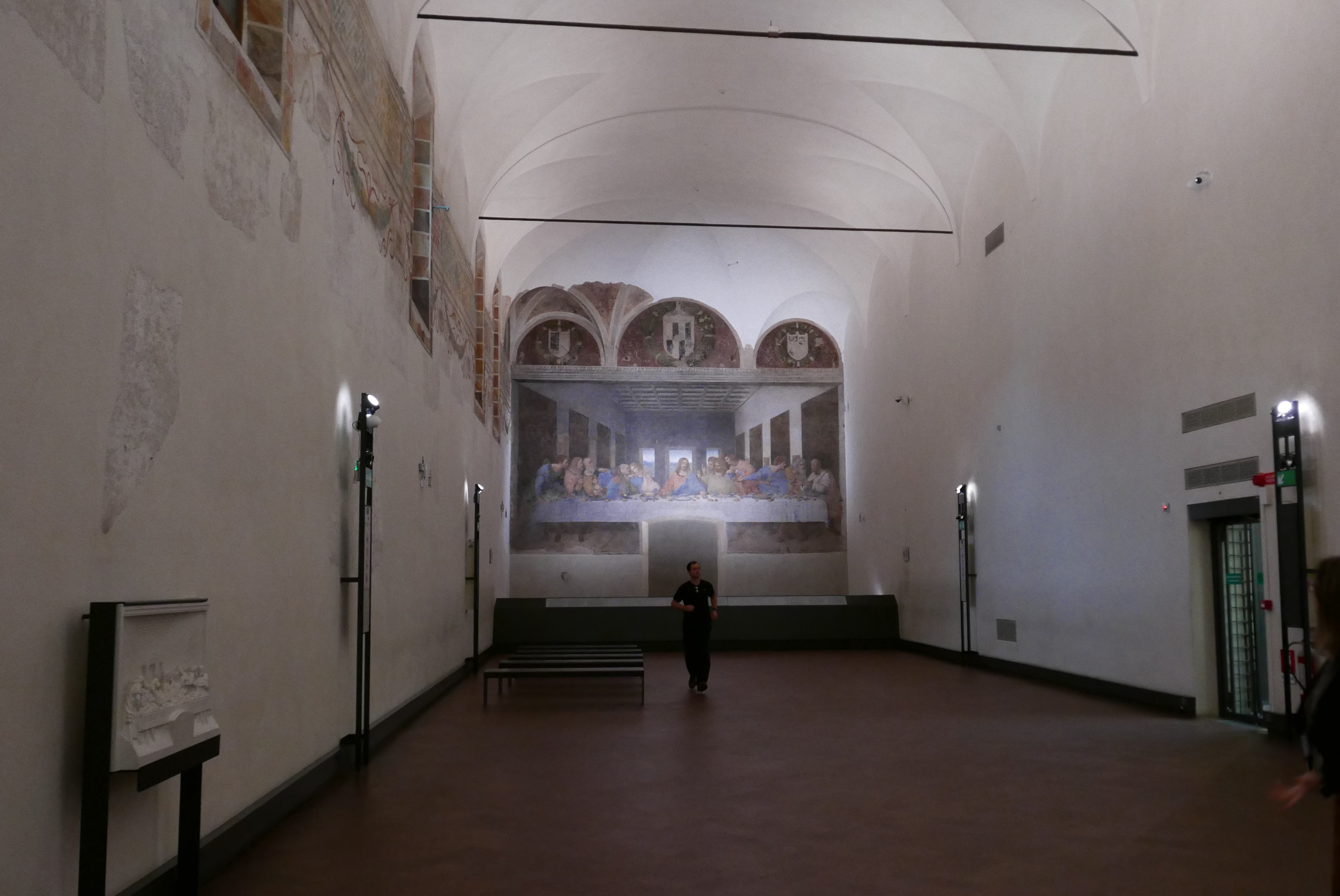
The refectory

=== Medium ===
Leonardo, as a painter, favoured oil painting, a medium which allows the artist to work slowly and make changes with ease. Fresco painting does not facilitate either of these objectives. Leonardo also sought a greater luminosity and intensity of light and shade (chiaroscuro) than could be achieved with fresco, in which the water-soluble colours are painted onto wet plaster, laid freshly each day in sections. Rather than using the proven method of painting on walls, Leonardo painted The Last Supper in tempera, the medium generally used for panel painting. The painting is on a stone wall sealed with a double layer of gesso, pitch, and mastic. Then he added an undercoat of white lead to enhance the brightness of the tempera that was applied on top. This was a method that had been described previously by Cennino Cennini in the 14th century. However, Cennini described the technique as being more risky than fresco painting, and recommended the use of painting in a more superficial medium for the final touches only.

=== Subject ===
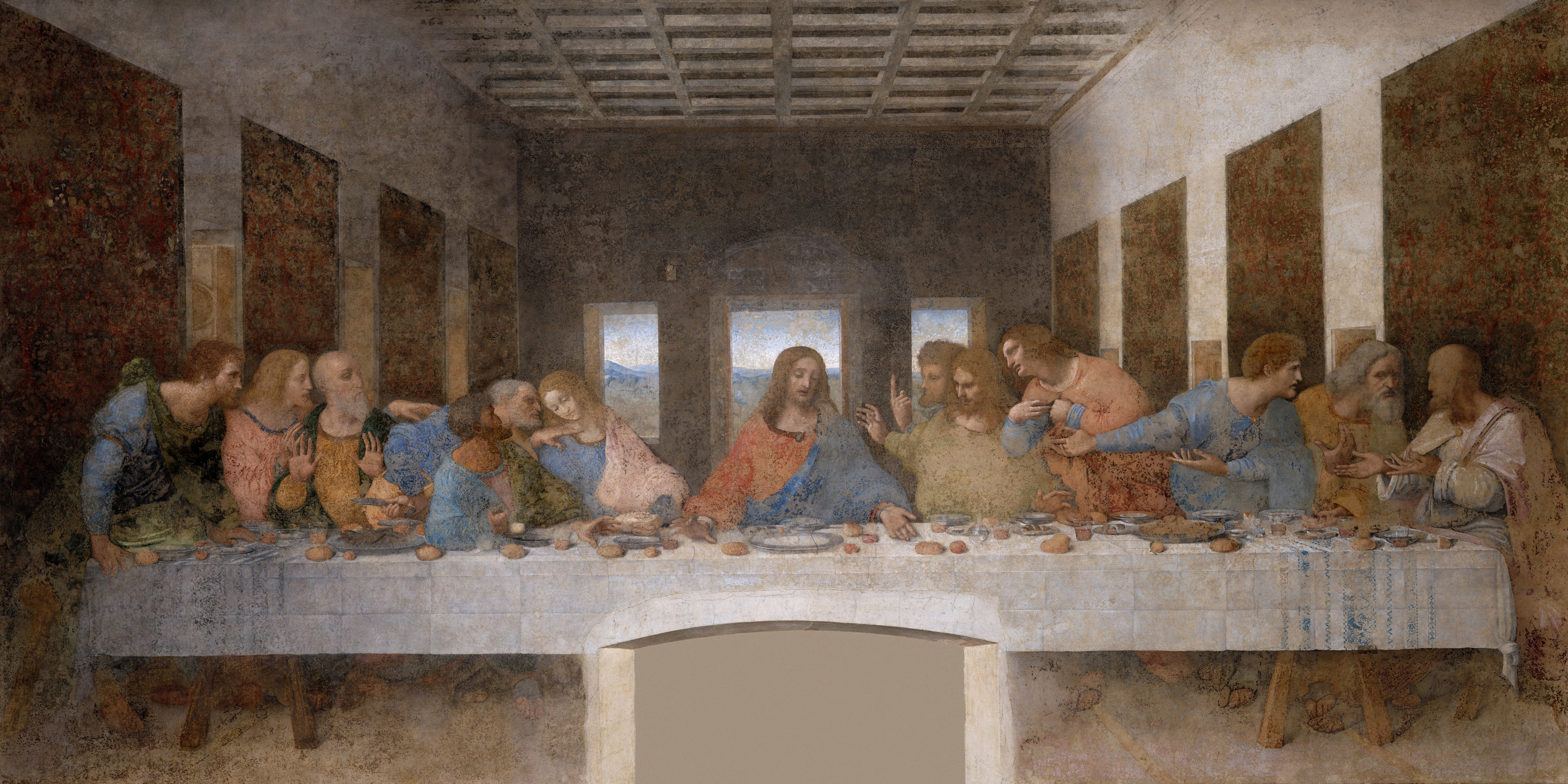
The Last Supper by Leonardo da Vinci (Clickable image – use cursor to identify.)

The Last Supper portrays the reaction given by each apostle when Jesus said one of them would betray him. All twelve apostles have different reactions to the news, with various degrees of anger and shock. The apostles were identified by their names, using an unsigned, mid-sixteenth-century fresco copy of Leonardo's Cenacolo. Before this, only Judas, Peter, John and Jesus had been positively identified. From left to right, according to the apostles' heads:

- Bartholomew, James, son of Alphaeus, and Andrew form a group of three; all are surprised.
- Judas Iscariot, Peter, and John form another group of three. Judas is wearing red, blue, and green and is in shadow, looking withdrawn and taken aback by the sudden revelation of his plan. He is clutching a small bag, perhaps signifying the silver given to him as payment to betray Jesus, or perhaps a reference to his role as a treasurer. He is also tipping over the salt cellar, which may be related to the near-Eastern expression to "betray the salt" meaning to betray one's master. He is the only person to have his elbow on the table and his head is also vertically the lowest of anyone in the painting. Peter wears an expression of anger and appears to be holding a knife, foreshadowing his violent reaction in Gethsemane during the arrest of Jesus. Peter is leaning towards John and touching him on the shoulder, in reference to John's Gospel where he signals the "beloved disciple" to ask Jesus who is to betray him. (Note: John 13:23–24) The youngest apostle, John, appears to swoon and lean towards Peter.
- Jesus
- Thomas, James the Greater, and Philip are the next group of three. Thomas is clearly upset; the raised index finger foreshadows his incredulity of the Resurrection. James the Greater looks stunned, with his arms in the air. Meanwhile, Philip appears to be requesting some explanation.
- Matthew, Jude Thaddeus, and Simon the Zealot are the final group of three. Both Thaddeus and Matthew are turned toward Simon, perhaps to find out if he has any answer to their initial questions.

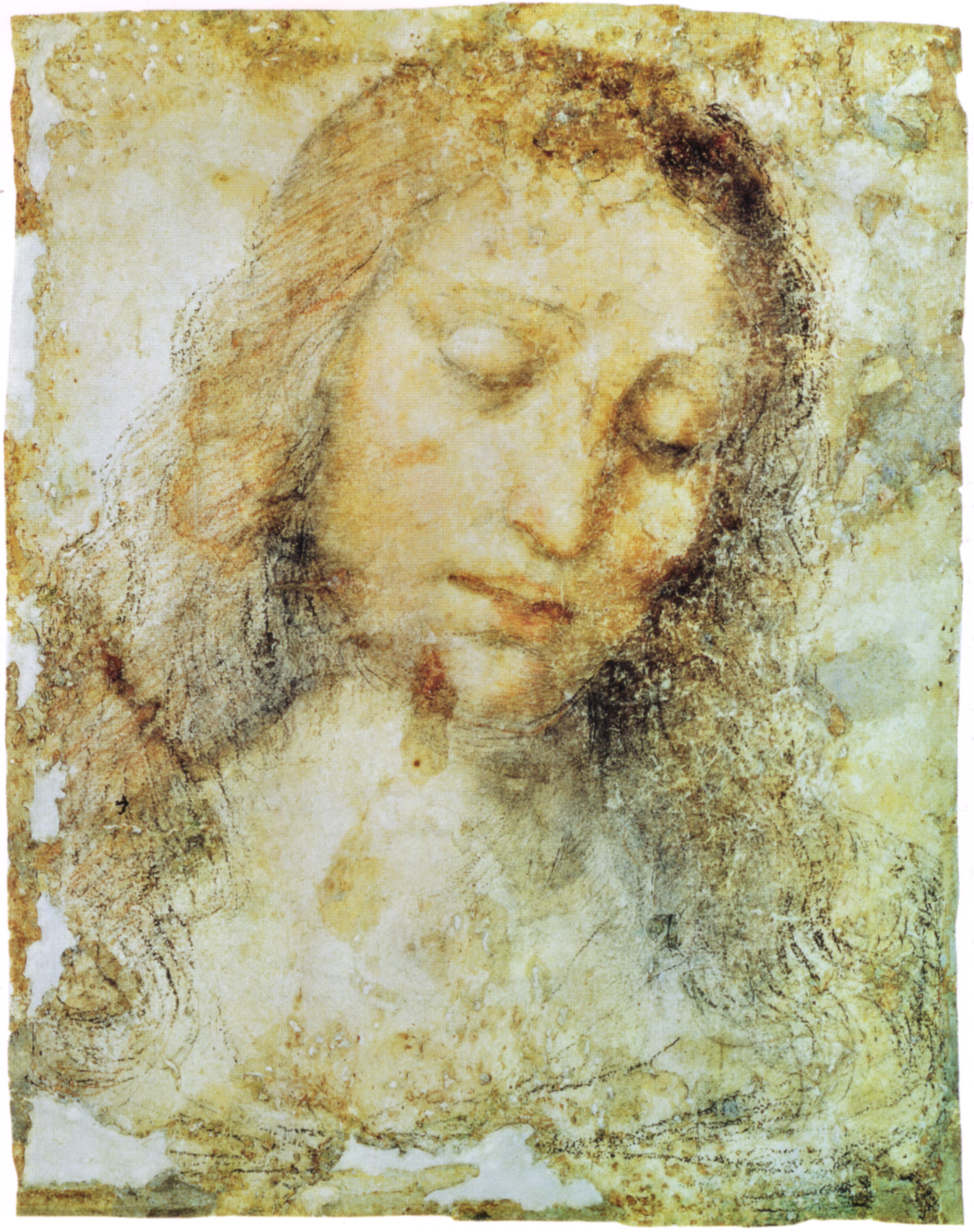
A study of the head of Christ by Leonardo

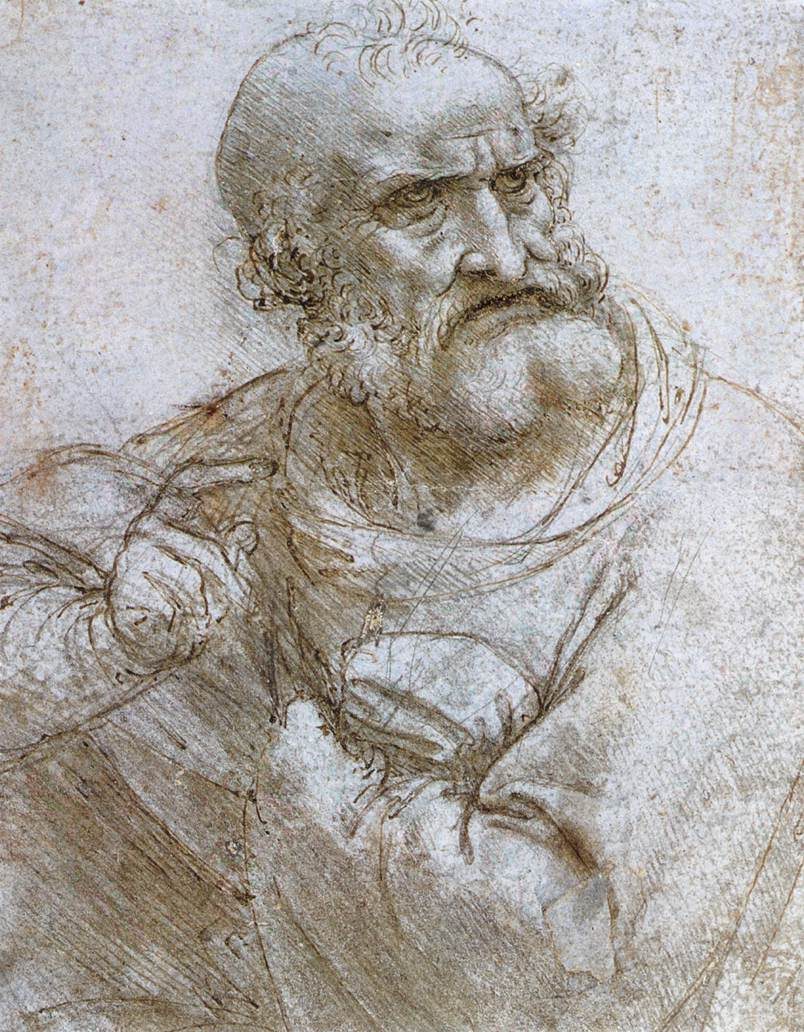
Silverpoint study of an apostle, most likely Saint Peter

In common with other depictions of the Last Supper from this period, Leonardo seats the diners on one side of the table, so that none of them has his back to the viewer. The tablecloth is white with blue stripes, which are colours commonly associated with the Jewish people. This is the painting's only overt reference to the ethnicity of Jesus and his disciples. Most previous depictions excluded Judas by placing him alone on the opposite side of the table from the other eleven disciples and Jesus, or placing halos around all the disciples except Judas. Leonardo instead has Judas lean back into shadow. Jesus is predicting that his betrayer will take the bread at the same time he does to Thomas and James the Greater to his left, who react in horror as Jesus points with his left hand to a piece of bread before them. Distracted by the conversation between John and Peter, Judas reaches for a different piece of bread not noticing Jesus too stretching out with his right hand towards it (Matthew 26: 23). The angles and lighting draw attention to Jesus, whose turned right cheek is located at the vanishing point for all perspective lines. In addition, the painting demonstrated Leonardo's masterful use of perspective as it "draws our attention to the face of Christ at the center of the composition, and Christ's face, through his down-turned gaze, directs our focus along the diagonal of his left arm to his hand and therefore, the bread."

Leonardo reportedly used the likenesses of people in and around Milan as inspiration for the painting's figures. The convent's prior complained to Sforza of Leonardo's "laziness" as he wandered the streets to find a criminal to base Judas on. Leonardo responded that if he could find no one else, the prior would make a suitable model. While the painting was being executed, Leonardo's friend, the mathematician Luca Pacioli, called it "a symbol of man's burning desire for salvation".

== History ==
=== Early copies ===
Two early copies of The Last Supper are known to exist, presumed to be work by Leonardo's assistants. The copies are almost the size of the original, and have survived with a wealth of original detail still intact. One, by Giampietrino, is in the collection of the Royal Academy of Arts, London, and the other, by Cesare da Sesto, is installed at the Church of St. Ambrogio in Ponte Capriasca, Switzerland. A third copy (oil on canvas) was painted by Andrea Solari (c. 1520) and is on display in the Leonardo da Vinci Museum of the Tongerlo Abbey, Belgium.

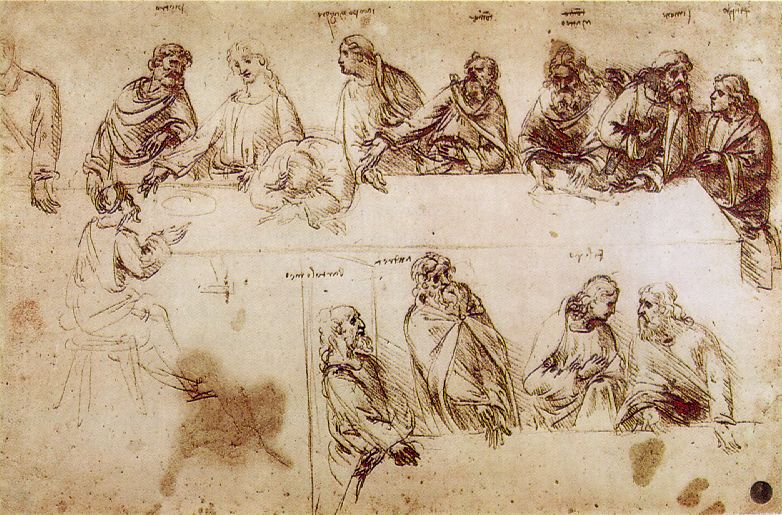
A study for The Last Supper (Note: The lower-right section continues the upper composition at left.) from Leonardo's notebooks shows twelve apostles, nine of which are identified by names written above their heads. Judas sits on the opposite side of the table, as in earlier depictions of the scene.

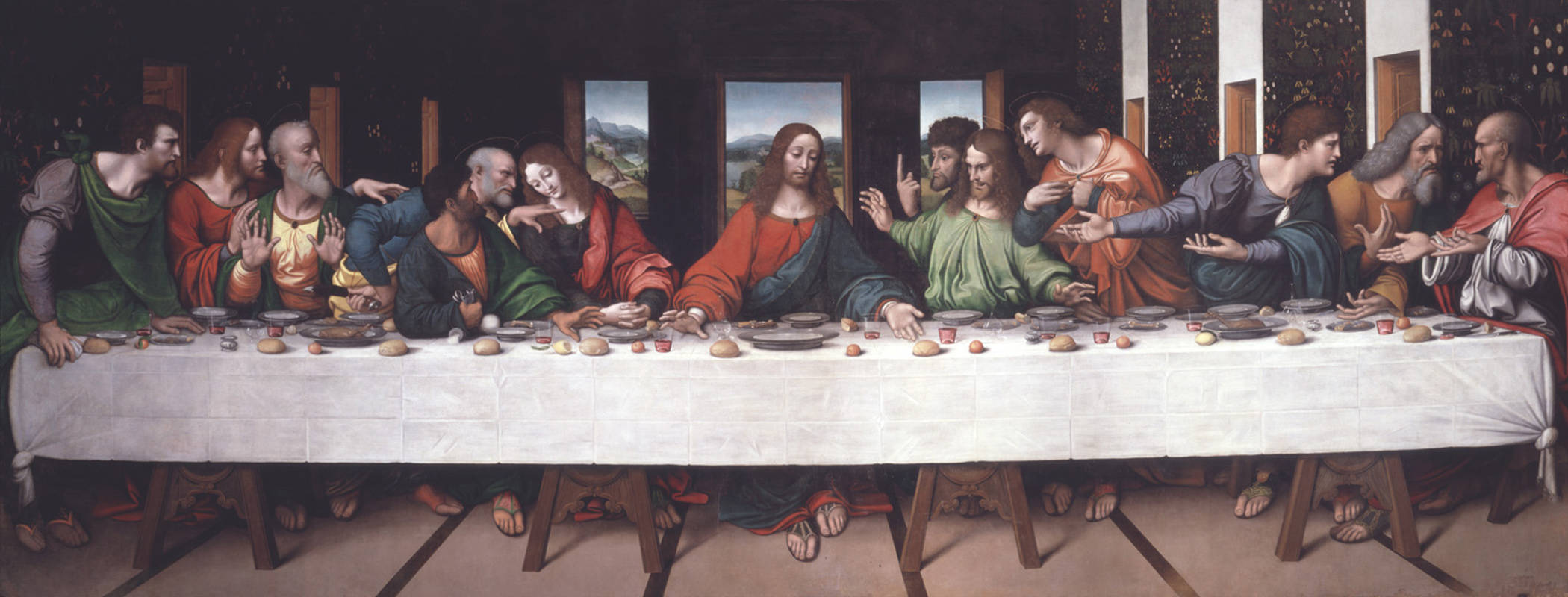
The Last Supper, c. 1520, by Giampietrino, oil on canvas, in the collection of the Royal Academy of Arts, London. (Note: The painting hung in the chapel of Magdalen College, Oxford, from 1992.) This full-scale copy was the main source for the 1978–1998 restoration of the original. It includes several lost details such as Christ's feet and the salt cellar spilled by Judas. Giampietrino is thought to have worked closely with Leonardo when he was in Milan.

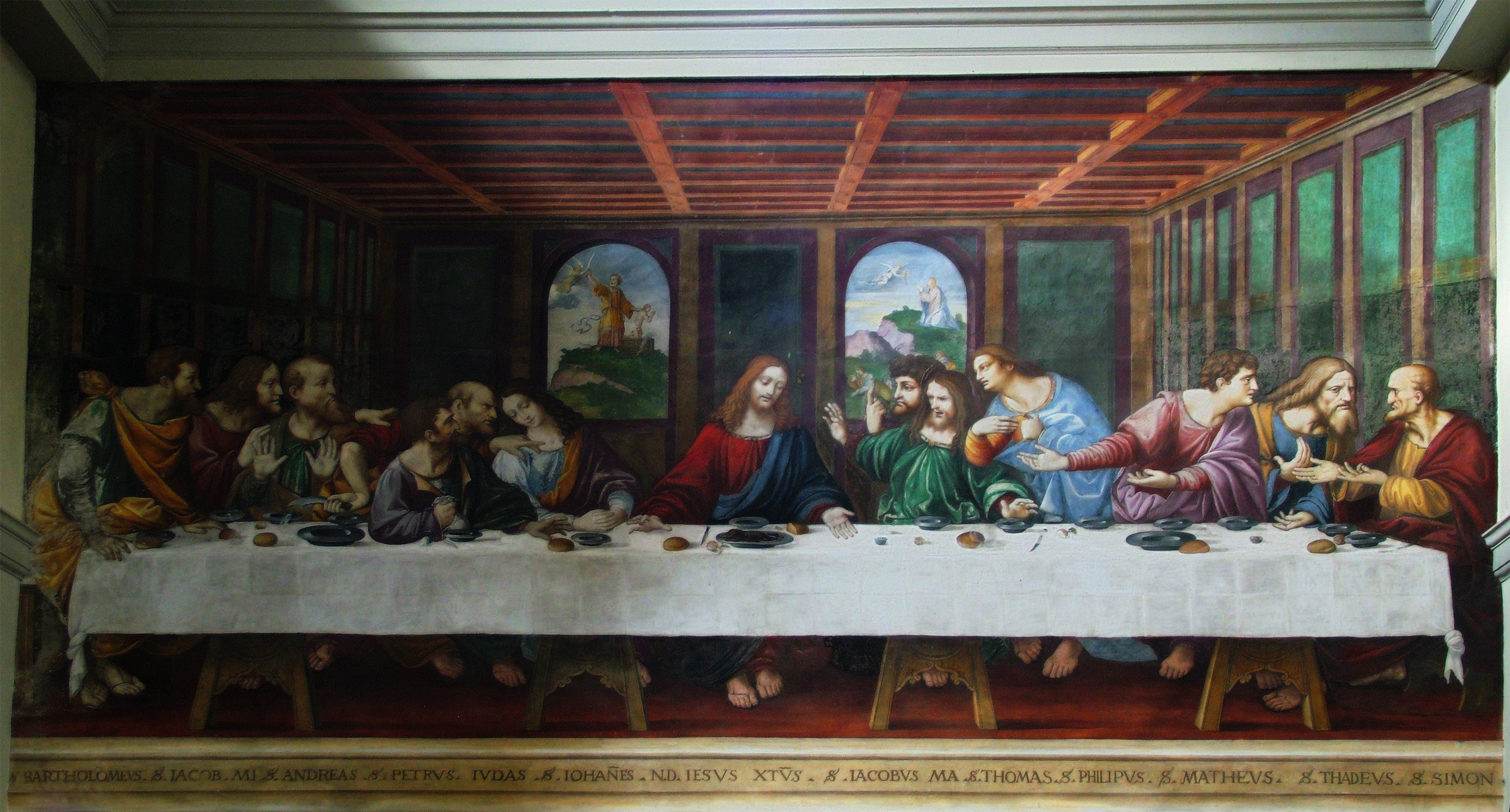
The Last Supper, by Cesare da Sesto (a pupil of Leonardo da Vinci), in the Church of S. Ambrogio

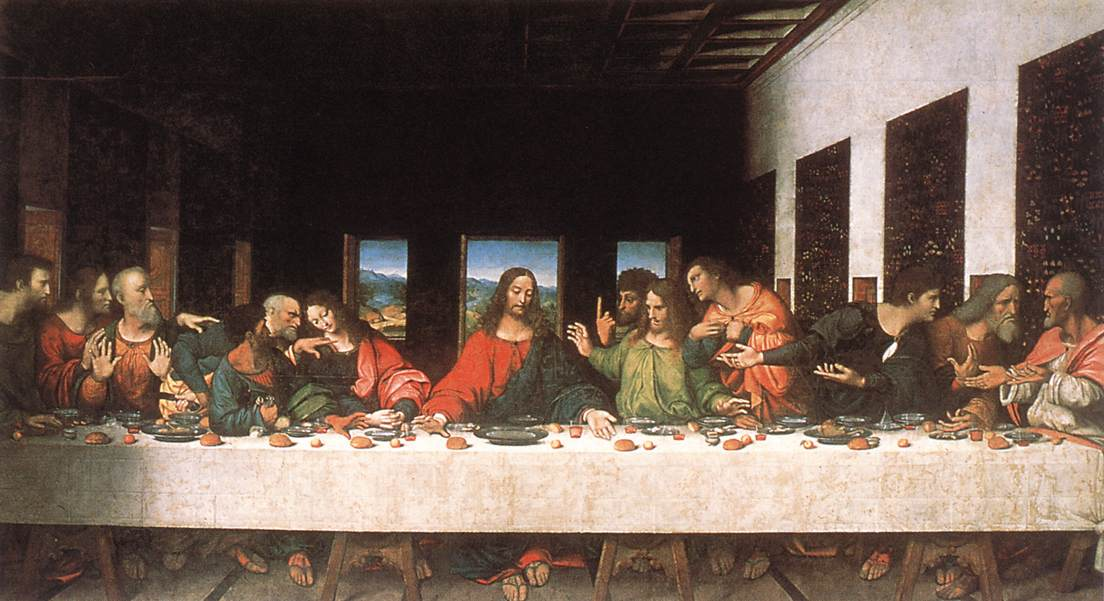
The Last Supper, c. 1520, Andrea Solari, oil on canvas, in the Leonardo da Vinci Museum, Tongerlo Abbey

=== Damage and restorations ===
Because Sforza had ordered the church to be rebuilt hastily, the masons filled the walls with moisture-retaining rubble. The painting was done on a thin exterior wall, so the effects of humidity were felt keenly, and the paint failed to properly adhere to it. Because of the method used, soon after the painting was completed on 9 February 1498 it began to deteriorate. In 1499, Louis XII contemplated removing the painting from the wall and taking it to France. As early as 1517, the painting was starting to flake, and in 1532 Gerolamo Cardano described it as "blurred and colorless compared with what I remember of it when I saw it as a boy". By 1556 – less than sixty years after it was finished – Giorgio Vasari described the painting as reduced to a "muddle of blots" so deteriorated that the figures were unrecognizable. By the second half of the 16th century, Gian Paolo Lomazzo stated that "the painting is all ruined". In 1652, a doorway was cut through the (then unrecognizable) painting, and later bricked up; this can still be seen as the irregular arch-shaped structure near the center base of the painting. It is believed, through early copies, that Jesus' feet were in a position symbolizing the forthcoming crucifixion. In 1768, a curtain was hung over the painting intended for its protection; the curtain instead trapped moisture on the surface, and whenever it was pulled back, it scratched the flaking paint.

A first restoration was attempted in 1726 by Michelangelo Bellotti, who filled in missing sections with oil paint then varnished the whole mural. This repair did not last well and another restoration was attempted in 1770 by an otherwise unknown artist named Giuseppe Mazza. Mazza stripped off Bellotti's work then largely repainted the painting; he had redone all but three faces when he was halted due to public outrage. In 1796, French revolutionary anti-clerical troops used the refectory as an armory and stable; they threw stones at the painting and climbed ladders to scratch out the Apostles' eyes. Goethe wrote that in 1800, the room was flooded with two feet of water after a heavy rainstorm. Later, the refectory was used as a prison; although it is not known if any of the prisoners may have damaged the painting. In 1821, Stefano Barezzi, an expert in removing whole frescoes from their walls intact, was called in to remove the painting to a safer location; he badly damaged the center section before realizing that Leonardo's work was not a fresco. Barezzi then attempted to reattach damaged sections with glue. From 1901 to 1908, Luigi Cavenaghi first completed a careful study of the structure of the painting, then began cleaning it. In 1924, Oreste Silvestri did further cleaning, and stabilised some parts with stucco.

A protective structure (right) was built in front of Leonardo's fresco. This photo shows the bombing damage in 1943.

During World War II, on 15 August 1943, the refectory was struck by Allied bombing; protective sandbagging prevented the painting from being struck by bomb splinters, but it may have been damaged by the vibration. Between 1946 and 1954, Mauro Pellicioli undertook a clean-and-stabilise restoration, which Brera director Fernanda Wittgens was involved in. Pellicioli reattached paint to the wall using a clear shellac, making it relatively darker and more colorful, and removed some of the overpainting. However, as of 1972, the repainting done in various restorations had made the heads of saints Peter, Andrew, and James differ significantly from the original design.

==== Major restoration ====
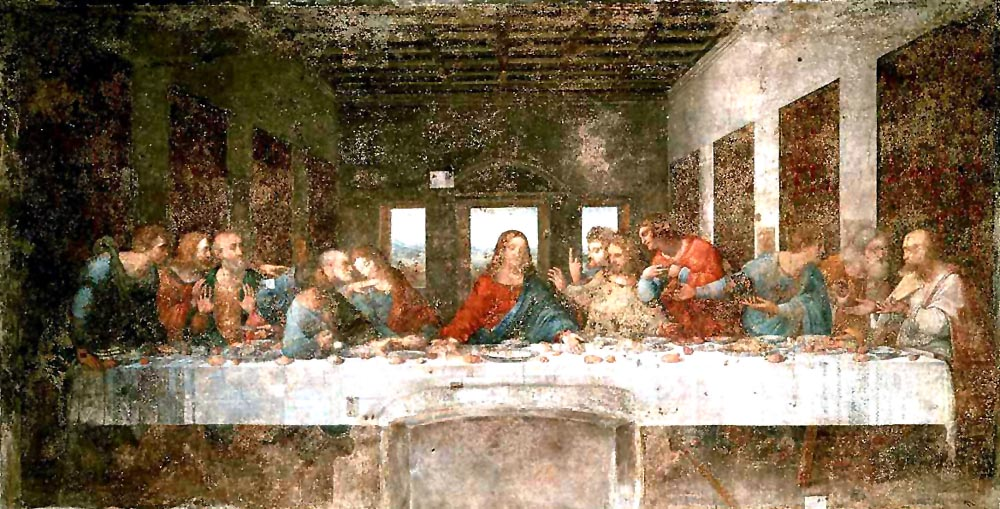
The painting as it looked in the 1970s

The painting's appearance by the late 1970s had badly deteriorated. From 1978 to 1999, Pinin Brambilla Barcilon guided a major restoration project to stabilize the painting and reverse the damage caused by dirt and pollution. The eighteenth- and nineteenth-century restoration attempts were also reversed. Since it had proved impractical to move the painting to a more controlled environment, the refectory was instead converted to a sealed, climate-controlled environment, which meant bricking up the windows. Then, detailed study was undertaken to determine the painting's original form, using scientific tests (especially infrared reflectoscopy and microscopic core-samples), and original cartoons preserved in the Royal Library at Windsor Castle. Some areas were deemed unrestorable. These were re-painted using watercolor in subdued colors intended to indicate they were not original work, while not being too distracting.

This restoration took 21 years and, on 28 May 1999, the painting was returned to display. Visitors were required to book ahead and could only stay for 15 minutes. When it was unveiled, considerable controversy was aroused by the dramatic changes in colors, tones, and even some facial shapes. James Beck, professor of art history at Columbia University and founder of ArtWatch International, has been a particularly strong critic. Michael Daley, director of ArtWatch UK, has also complained about the restored version of the painting. He has been critical of Christ's right arm in the image which has been altered from a draped sleeve to what Daley calls "muff-like drapery".

== In culture ==
The Last Supper has frequently been referenced, reproduced, or parodied in Western culture. Some of the more notable examples are:

=== Non-modern painting, mosaic, and photography ===
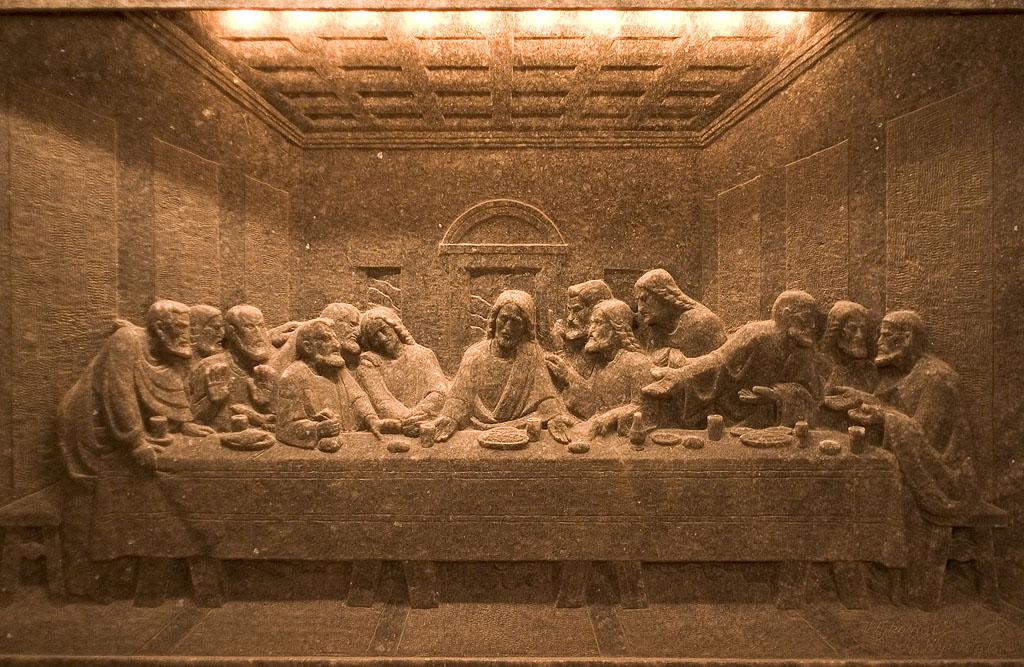
The Last Supper made in salt in Wieliczka Salt Mine (Poland)

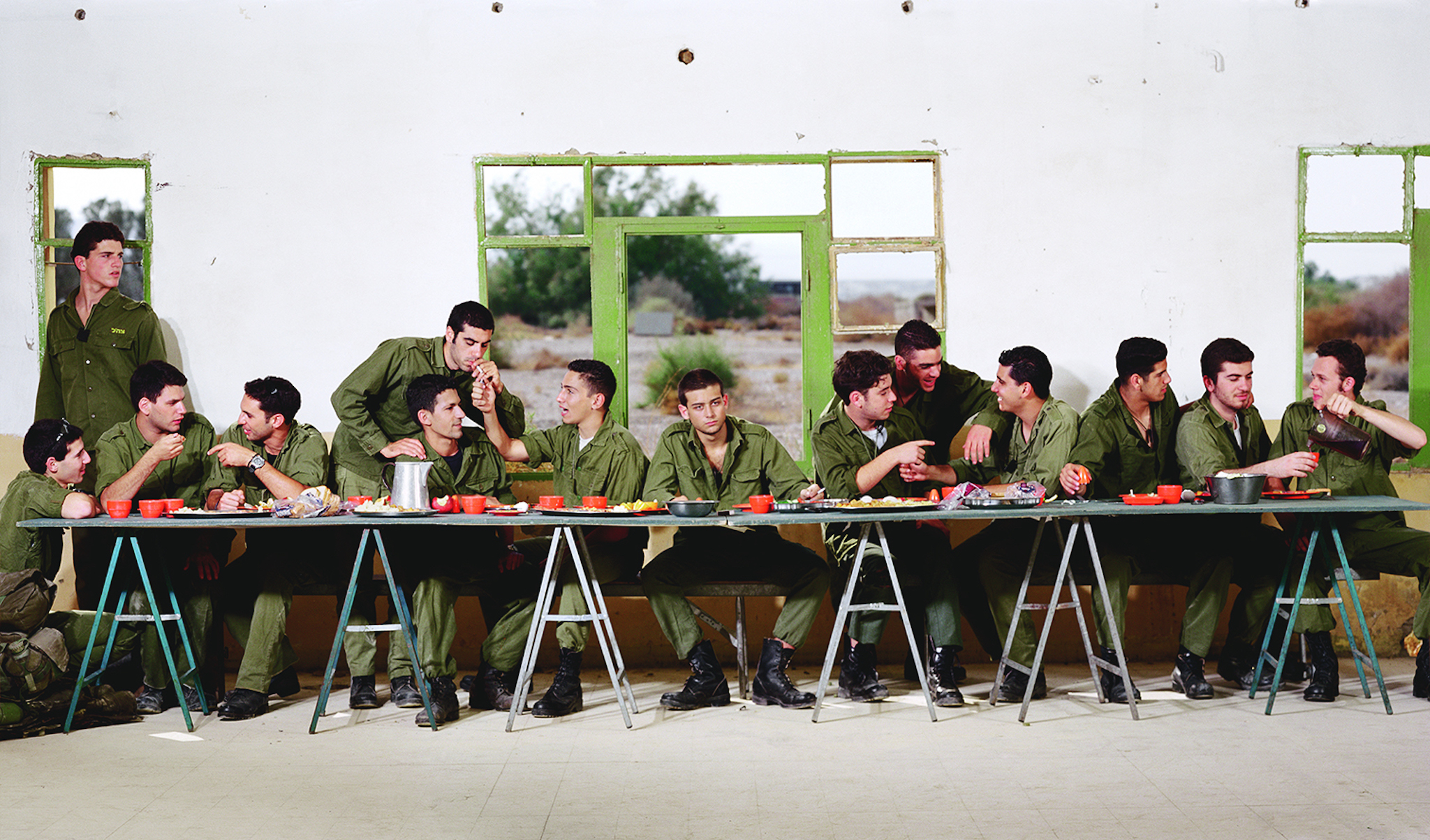
The Last Supper by Adi Nes (Israel) was sold for $264,000 in 2007.

A 16th-century oil on canvas copy is conserved in the abbey of Tongerlo, Antwerp, Belgium. It reveals many details that are no longer visible on the original. The Roman mosaic artist Giacomo Raffaelli made another life-sized copy (1809–1814), commissioned by Napoleon Bonaparte, that resides in the Minoritenkirche in Vienna.

=== Modern art ===
In 1955, Salvador Dalí painted The Sacrament of the Last Supper, with Jesus portrayed as blond and clean shaven, pointing upward to a spectral torso while the apostles are gathered around the table heads bowed so that none may be identified. It is reputed to be one of the most viewed paintings in the collection of the National Gallery of Art in Washington, D.C.

Mary Beth Edelson's Some Living American Women Artists / Last Supper (1972) appropriated The Last Supper, with the heads of notable women artists collaged over the heads of Christ and his apostles. The artists collaged over the heads of Christ and his apostles in Some Living American Women Artists / Last Supper include Lynda Benglis, Louise Bourgeois, Elaine de Kooning, Helen Frankenthaler, Nancy Graves, Lila Katzen, Lee Krasner, Georgia O'Keeffe, Louise Nevelson, Yoko Ono, M. C. Richards, Alma Thomas, and June Wayne. As well, other women artists have their image shown in the border of the piece; in all eighty-two women artists are part of the whole image. This image, addressing the role of religious and art historical iconography in the subordination of women, became "one of the most iconic images of the feminist art movement".

Sculptor Marisol Escobar rendered The Last Supper as a life-sized, three-dimensional, sculptural assemblage using painted and drawn wood, plywood, brownstone, plaster, and aluminum. This work, Self-Portrait Looking at The Last Supper (1982–1984), is in New York's Metropolitan Museum of Art.

Art dealer Alexander Iolas commissioned Andy Warhol to produce a series of paintings based on The Last Supper, first exhibited in Milan in January 1987. The series would be the artist's last before his death.

=== Literature ===
In her 1834 ekphrasic poem, "The Last Supper", Lydia Sigourney focuses on Christ's betrayer, repeatedly asks "Is it I?" and closes with the prayer that our feet be so guided:

That our Last Supper in this world may lead to
That immortal banquet by thy side,
Where there is no betrayer.

Author Mary Shelley describes her impression of the painting in her travel narrative, Rambles in Germany and Italy, published 1844:

First we visited the fading inimitable fresco of Leonardo da Vinci. How vain are copies! not in one, nor in any print, did i ever see the slightest approach to the expression in our Savior's face, such as it is in the original. Majesty and love – these are the words that would describe it – joined to an absence of all guile that expresses the divine nature more visibly than I ever saw it in any other picture.

— Mary Shelley, Rambles in Germany and Italy (1844), pp. 109–110

=== Film ===
For a scene set in the refectory in the 2026 film The Devil Wears Prada 2, the producers commissioned the construction of a detailed three-quarter-scale replica of the room on a soundstage elsewhere in Milan. It included a hand-painted reproduction of The Last Supper. In the scene, where the fictional fashion magazine Runway hosts an exclusive dinner in the refectory, Andrea Sachs (Anne Hathaway) is contemplating the painting when her boss, Miranda Priestly, comes up alongside her and discusses how unusual the work is because unlike many of the other representations of the Last Supper in European buildings from the era, Jesus is not depicted with a halo. Miranda sees that as Leonardo wishing to emphasize his humanity and fallibility, showing how we will all eventually betray each other, "because it's what we do". This leads Sachs to fear that Miranda has learned of a secret plan she and a former coworker are developing to save Runway from a cost-cutting new owner.

== Other speculation ==
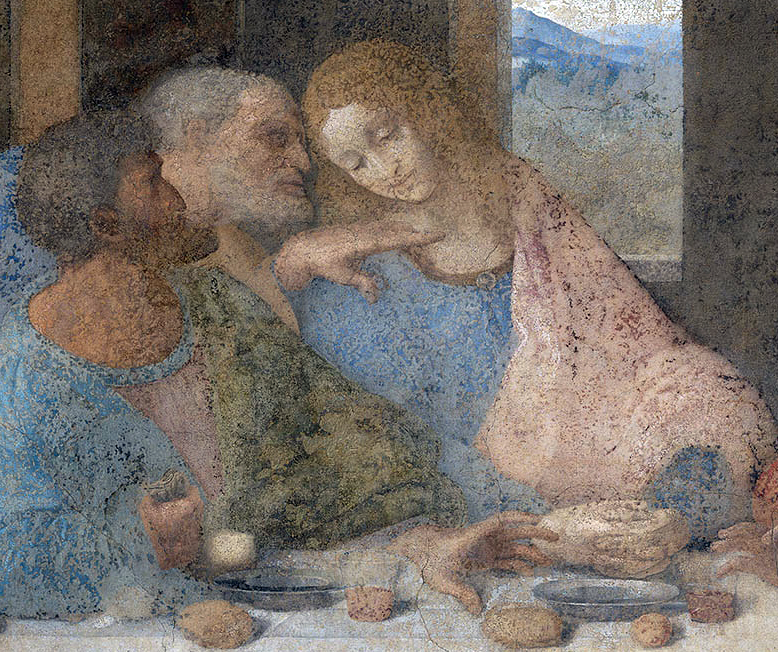
Detail of the "beloved disciple" to Jesus's right, identified by art historians as the apostle John, but speculated in the 2003 book The Da Vinci Code and similar works to be Mary Magdalene

The Last Supper has been the target of much speculation by writers and historical revisionists alike, usually centered on purported hidden messages or hints found within the painting, especially since the publication of Dan Brown's novel The Da Vinci Code (2003), in which one of the characters suggests that the person to Jesus' right (left of Jesus from the viewer's perspective) is actually Mary Magdalene. It also states that there was a letter 'glaring in the center of the painting' (M) standing for Matrimonio or Mary Magdalene. This speculation originated in earlier books The Templar Revelation (1997) by Lynn Picknett and The Holy Blood and the Holy Grail by Michael Baigent, Henry Lincoln and Richard Leigh (1982). Art historians hold that the figure is the Apostle John, who appears androgynous in line with Leonardo's characteristic fascination with blurring the lines between the sexes, a quality which is found in his other paintings, such as St. John the Baptist (painted c. 1513–1516). Christopher L. Hodapp and Alice Von Kannon comment, "If he [John] looks effeminate and needs a haircut, so does James, the second figure on the left." According to Ross King, an expert on Italian art, Mary Magdalene's appearance at the last supper would not have been controversial and Leonardo would have had no motive to disguise her as one of the other disciples, since she was widely venerated in her role as the "Apostle to the Apostles" and was the patron of the Dominican Order, for whom The Last Supper was painted. There would have even been precedent for it, since the earlier Italian Renaissance painter Fra Angelico had included her in his painting of the Last Supper.

Two details in Leonardo's depiction have become associated with superstitions and omens of bad luck. The 13 figures at the table represent Jesus and his twelve apostles, a gathering traditionally associated with the superstition that having thirteen people dine together brings misfortune. An overturned spilt salt shaker beside Judas Iscariot has been interpreted as an omen of bad luck and a possible symbol of his impending betrayal of Jesus.

The painting contains several possible numerical references, including to the number three. The Apostles are seated in groups of three, there are three windows behind Jesus, and the shape of Jesus' figure resembles a triangle. His hands are located at the golden ratio of half the height of the composition. The painting can also be interpreted using the Fibonacci series: one table, one central figure, two side walls, three windows and figures grouped in threes, five groups of figures, eight panels on the walls and eight table legs, and thirteen individual figures. Debates among art historians still surround the use of the Fibonacci series as some argue that its purposeful use did not fully begin to be applied to architecture until the early 19th century.

== See also ==
- List of works by Leonardo da Vinci
- Twelve Apostles in art

== Bibliography ==
- Wallace, Robert (1972) [1966]. The World of Leonardo: 1452–1519. New York: Time-Life Books. ISBN 978-0316509206.
