= Head of Christ (Leonardo) =

Chalk and pastel study, c. 1494

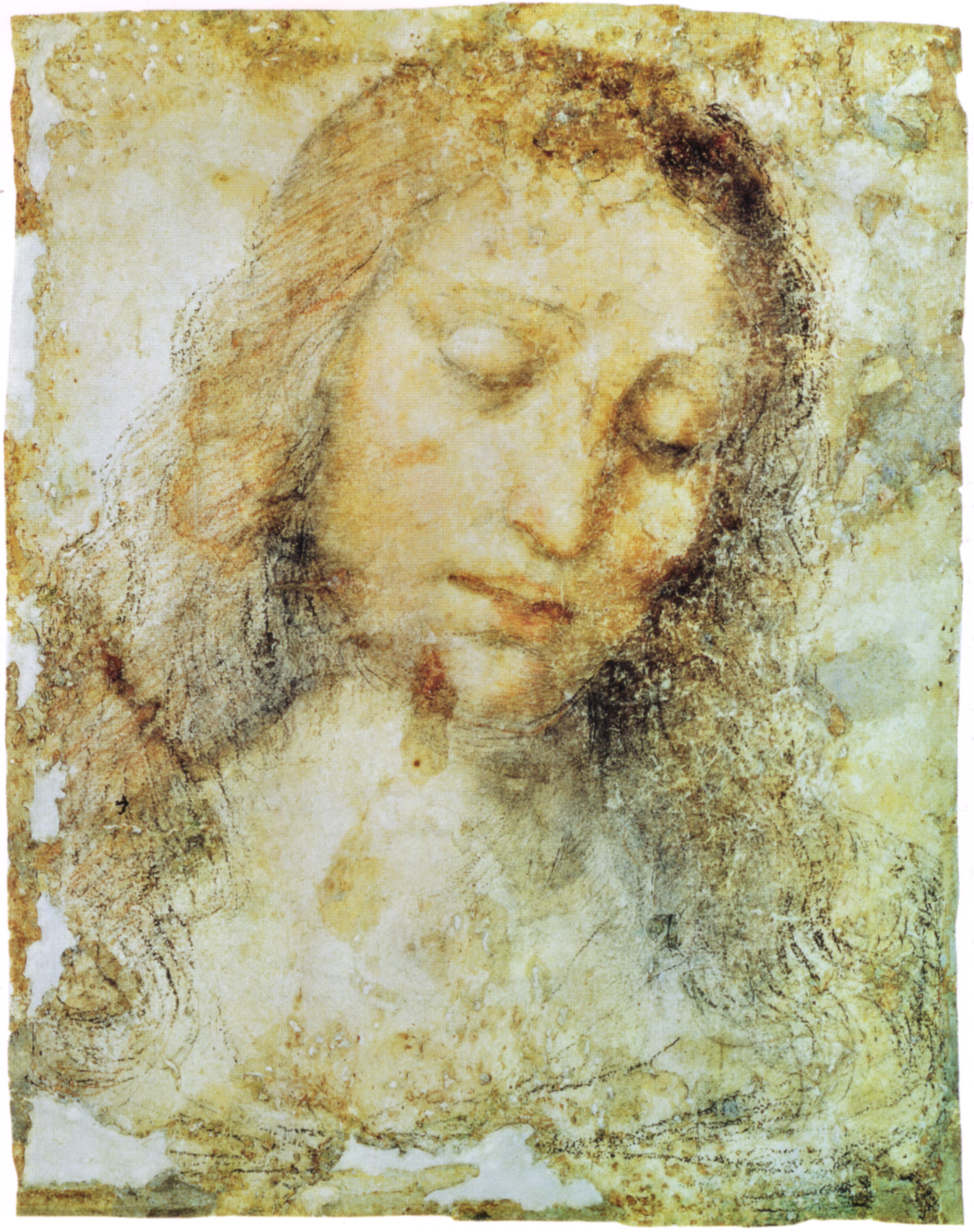
Head of Christ

Head of Christ is a c.1494 chalk and pastel study by Leonardo da Vinci for his The Last Supper. It measures 40 by 32 cm (16 by 13 in) and is now in the Pinacoteca di Brera.

== See also ==
- List of works by Leonardo da Vinci
