= Oreste Silvestri =

Italian painter (1858–1936)

Oreste Silvestri (5 September 1858 – 24 November 24, 1936) was an Italian painter.

== Biography ==
He was born in Pollone in Biella to a Piedmontese mother and Lombard father. He became known as one of the premier acquafortisti of his age. In the Promotrice of Turin, he exhibited acquaforte reproductions of Aracne by Carlo Stratta, the Vaccheria Svizzera by Giacomo Grosso, and Alaggio sul Tanaro by Lorenzo Delleani. After he moved to Milan, he established, along with Giuseppe Mentessi, an art school of the Società Umanitaria.

He presented his works at many National Expositions. In 1889 at Turin, he displayed: Una giornata di Sole. In 1883 at the Fine Arts Exposition in Rome, he displayed Alla fontana. In 1884 at the Mostra of Fine Arts at Turin: Impressione d'Estate. He also participated in many prominent restorations including that of Da Vinci's The Last Supper in 1924. He was also an erudite and cultured art collector and merchant. He died in Milan.

He was likely related to the portrait artist Carlo Silvestri (1821-1883), whose self-portrait he donated (1937) to the Galleria d'Arte Moderna in Milan.
