= Santa Maria delle Grazie, Milan =

Church and Dominican convent in Milan in Milan, Italy

Church of Holy Mary of Grace Chiesa di Santa Maria delle Grazie
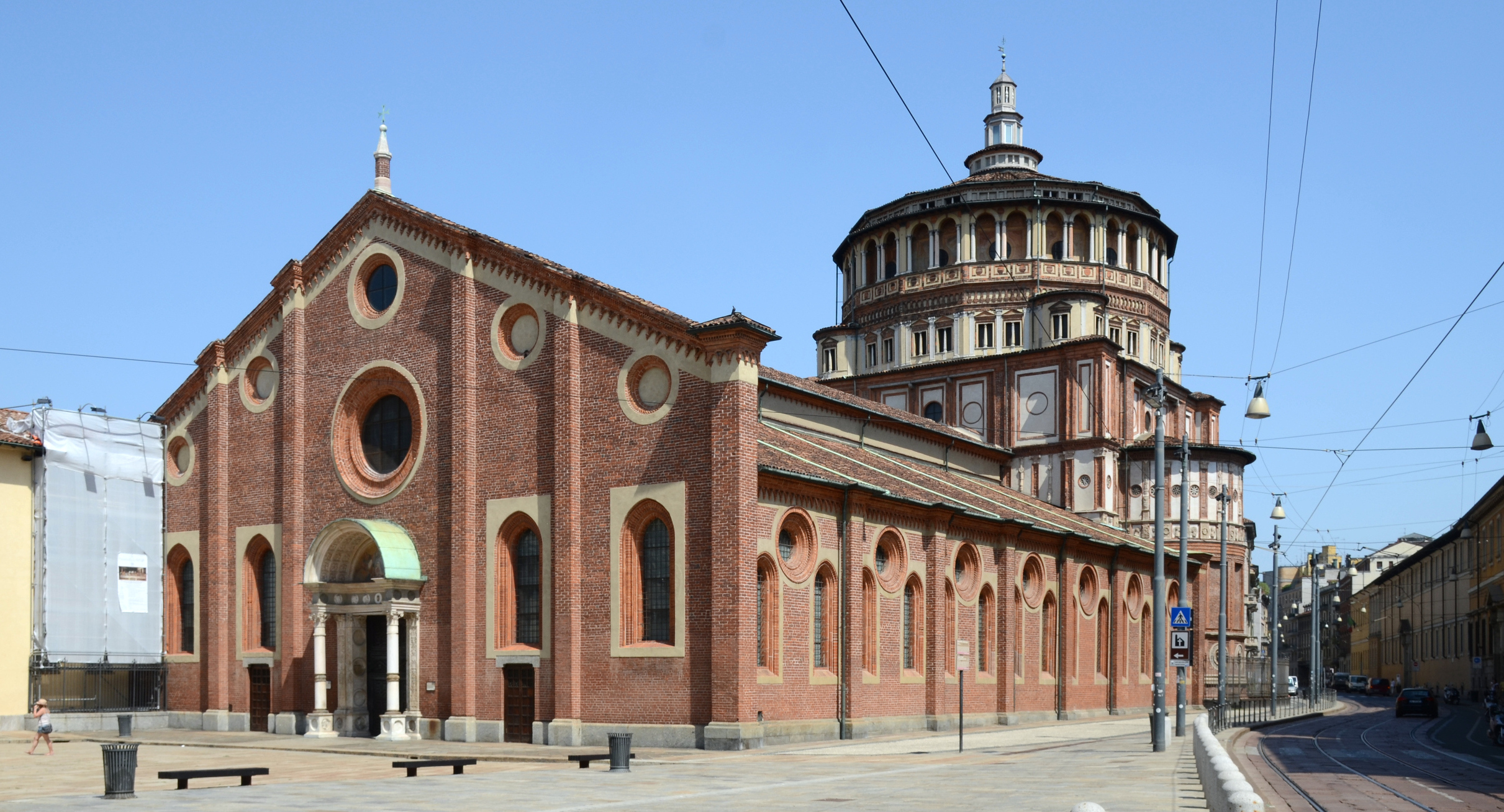
- Holy Mary's façade, in the background its dome, made by Bramante

Religion
- Affiliation: Roman Catholic
- Province: Archdiocese of Milan
- Rite: Roman Rite

Location
- Location: Milan, Italy
- Interactive map of Church of Holy Mary of Grace Chiesa di Santa Maria delle Grazie
- Coordinates: 45°27′57″N 9°10′16″E

Architecture
- Architects: Guiniforte Solari; Donato Bramante
- Type: Church
- Style: Gothic (Nave); Renaissance (Apse and Dome)
- Groundbreaking: 1463
- Completed: 1497
- UNESCO World Heritage Site
- Official name: Church and Dominican Convent of Santa Maria delle Grazie with "The Last Supper" by Leonardo da Vinci
- Type: Cultural
- Criteria: i, ii,
- Designated: 1980 (4th session)
- Reference no.: 93
- State Party: Italy
- Region: Europe and North America

Santa Maria delle Grazie (English: "Holy Mary of Grace") is a church and Dominican convent in Milan, northern Italy, and a UNESCO World Heritage Site. The convent contains the mural of The Last Supper by Leonardo da Vinci, which is in the refectory.

== History ==
Duke of Milan Francesco I Sforza ordered the construction of a Dominican convent and church at the site of a prior chapel dedicated to the Marian devotion of St Mary of the Graces. The main architect, Guiniforte Solari, designed the convent (the Gothic nave), which was completed by 1469. Construction of the church took decades. Duke Ludovico Sforza decided to have the church serve as the Sforza family burial site, and rebuilt the cloister and the apse, both completed after 1490. Ludovico's wife Beatrice was buried in the church in 1497.

The design of the apse of the church has been attributed to Donato Bramante, (Note: Bramante was in the service of the Duchy at the time.) as his name is inscribed in a piece of marble in the church vaults delivered in 1494. However, some dispute that he worked on the church at all. According to one source, in 1492–1497 Bramante worked on the crossing and the dome as well the transept apses and the coir with apse; this source also attributes a plan and section of the building to Bramante. Some documents mention the name Amadeo, likely Giovanni Antonio Amadeo. There are similarities between this church and Amadeo's design for Santa Maria alla Fontana.

In 1543, the Titian altarpiece depicting Christ receiving the crown of thorns was installed in the Chapel of the Holy Crown, located on the right of the nave. The painting, looted by French troops in 1797, is now in the Louvre. This chapel is frescoed with Stories of the Passion by Gaudenzio Ferrari. In the small cloister adjacent to the tribune near the door that leads to the sacristy is a fresco by Bramantino. The church also contained frescoes depicting the Resurrection and Passion by Bernardo Zenale.

Composer and cellist Giovanni Perroni served as maestro di cappella at the cathedral from 1718–1720.

== World War II ==
During World War II, on the night of 15 August 1943, an allied aerial bombardment hit the church and the convent. Much of the refectory was destroyed, but some walls survived, including the one that holds The Last Supper, which had been sand-bagged in order to protect it. Some preservation works are done to maintain it for the future. Previously distorted by attempts at restoration carried out over the centuries, Leonardo's original painting has now emerged as a result of the work begun in 1978 and completed in 1999. This involved addressing complex problems as regards not only the painting itself but also the environment of the refectory in order to protect the work from the dust, fumes and humidity identified as the primary causes of its constant deterioration. It is believed that the current and future preservation works will keep the painting safe for many centuries to come.

== Contemporary ==
Nowadays the Sacrestia vecchia, or the Old Sacristy, designed and constructed by Donato Bramante, is the seat of a Dominican Cultural Centre (Centro Culturale alle Grazie), in which the brethren organize and host conferences on various themes pertaining to spirituality, philosophy, art, literature and sociology, in addition to musical concerts and artistic exhibitions.

== Gallery ==
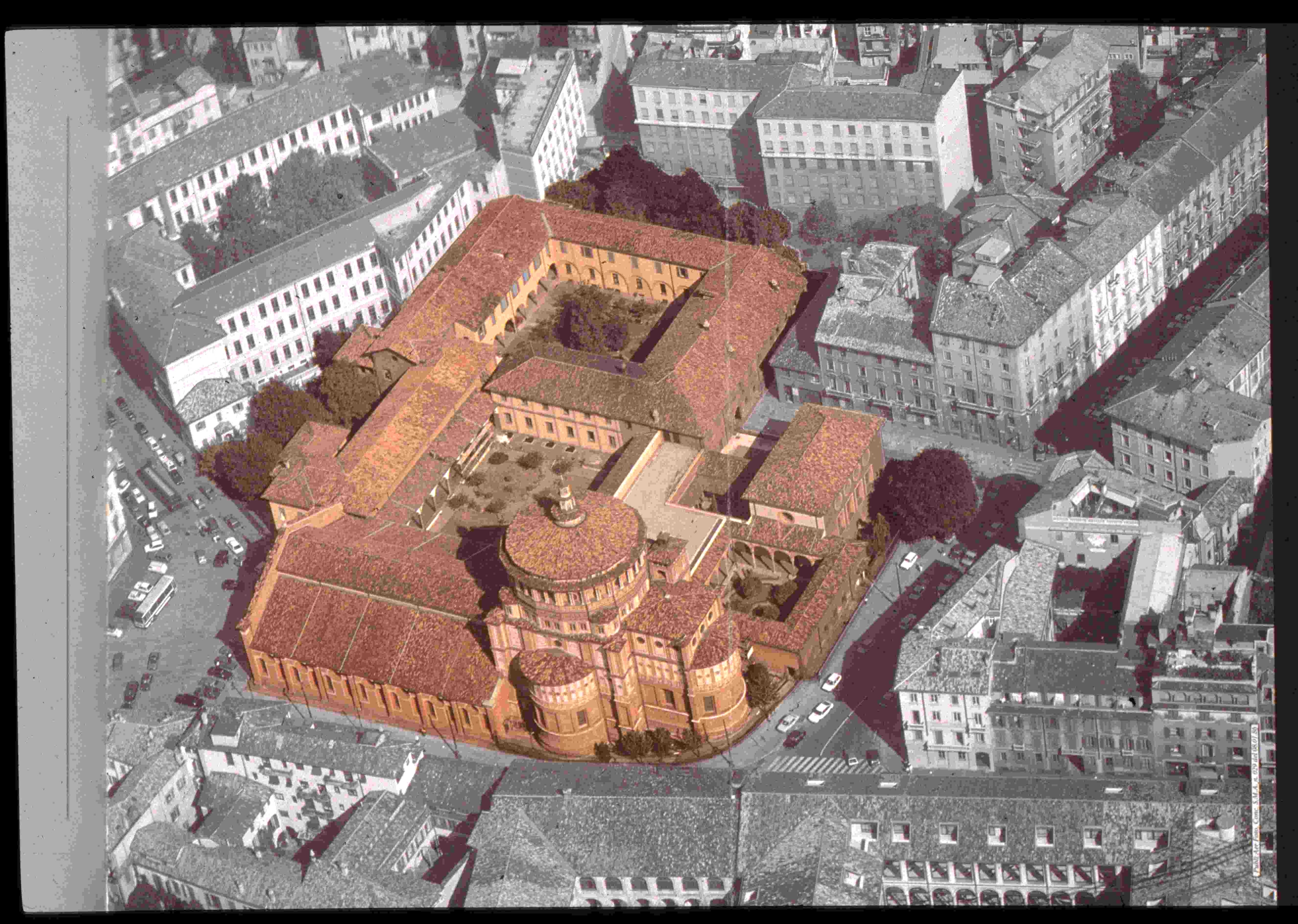
The Church of Santa Maria delle Grazie prior to 1976

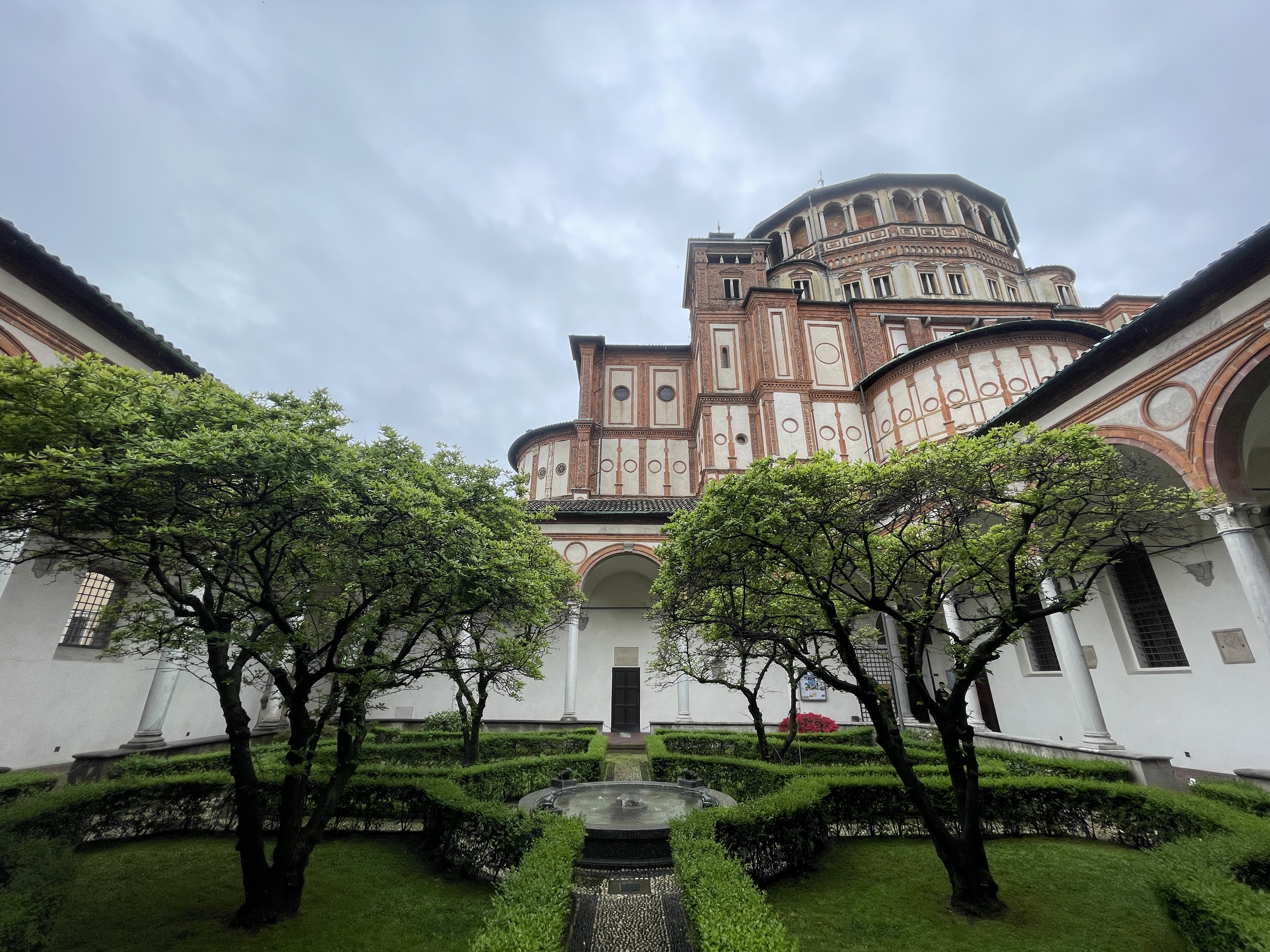
Cloister of Santa Maria delle Grazie

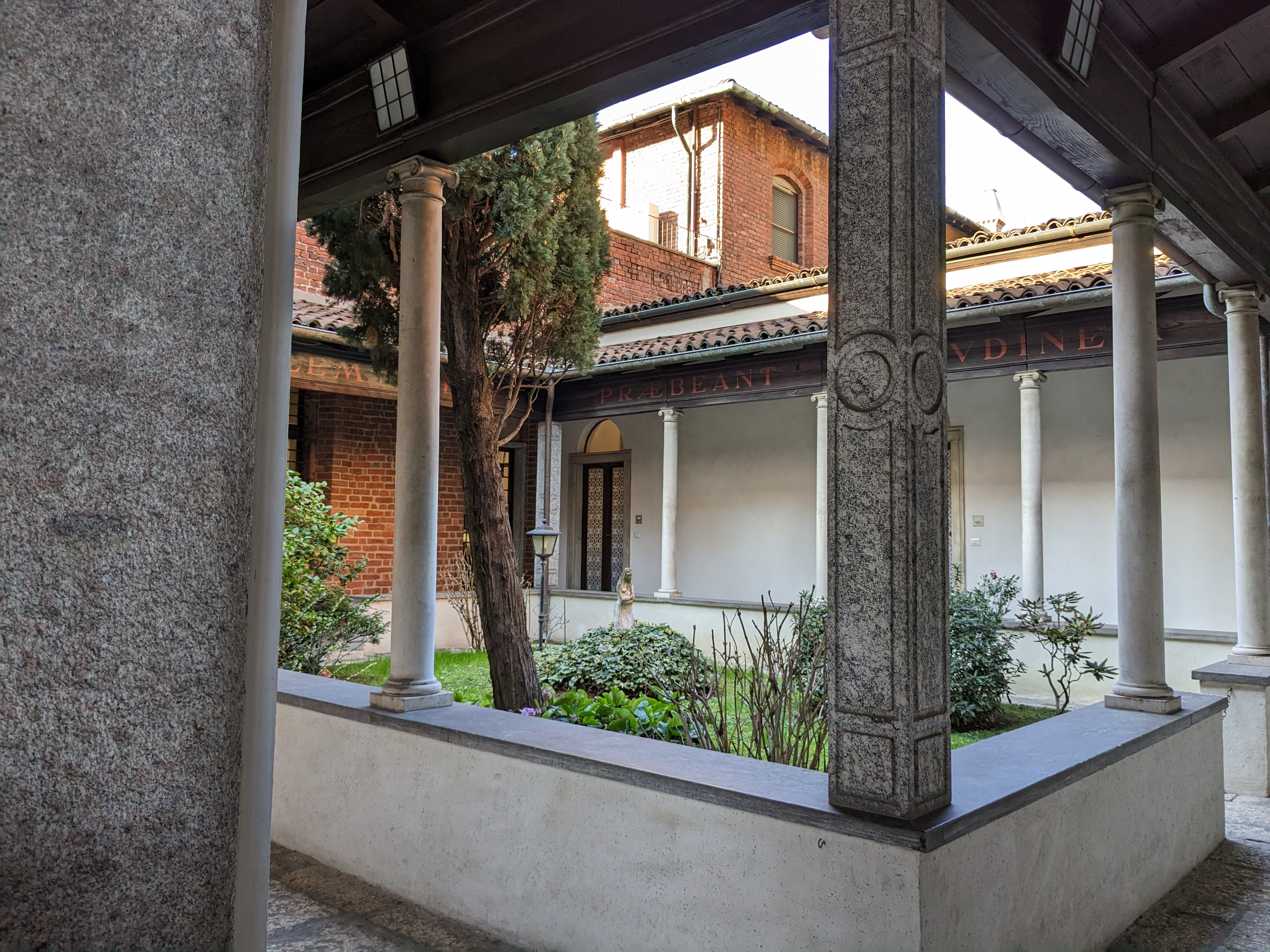
Passage leading to the monks' private cloister

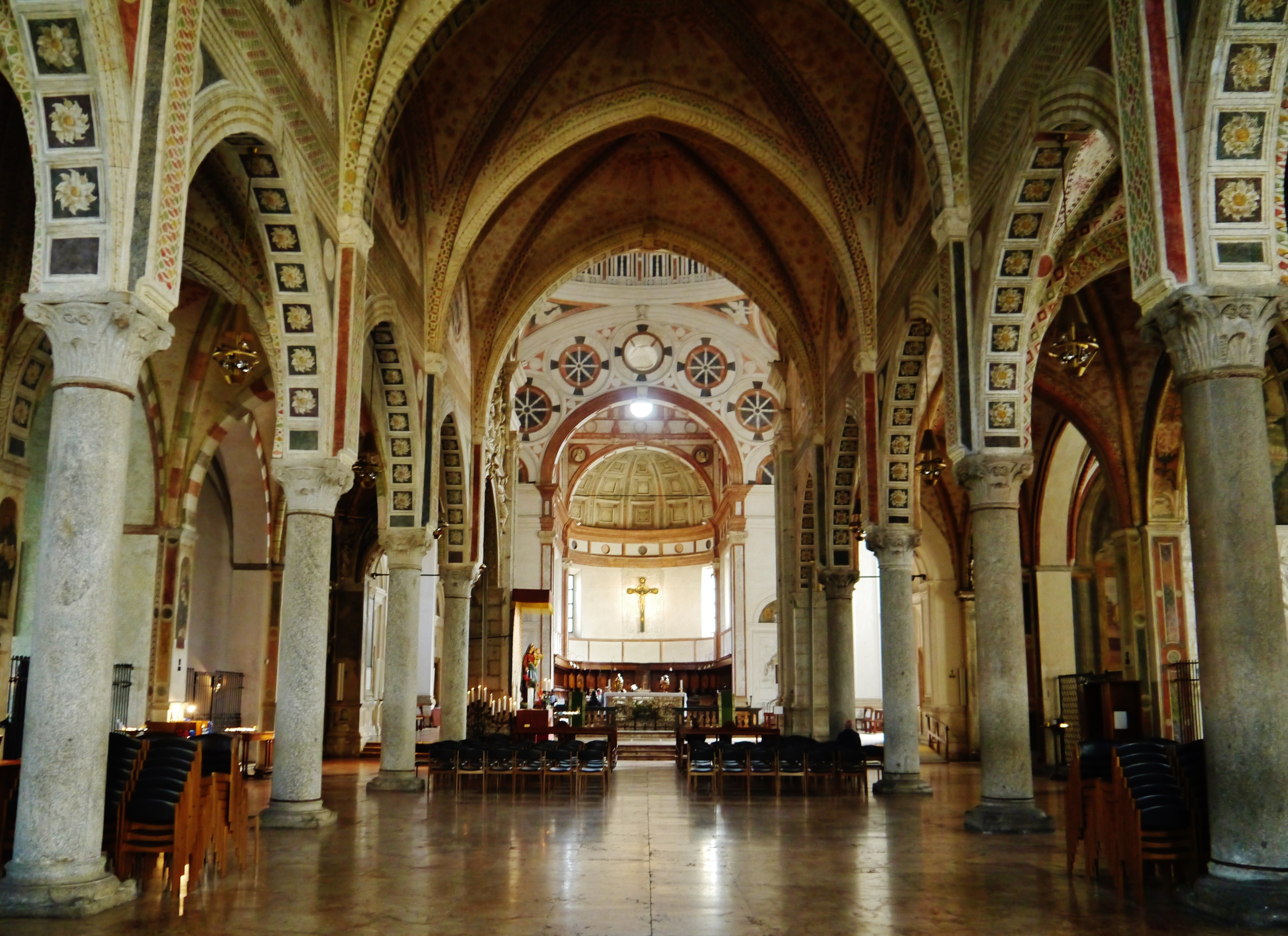
Interior view

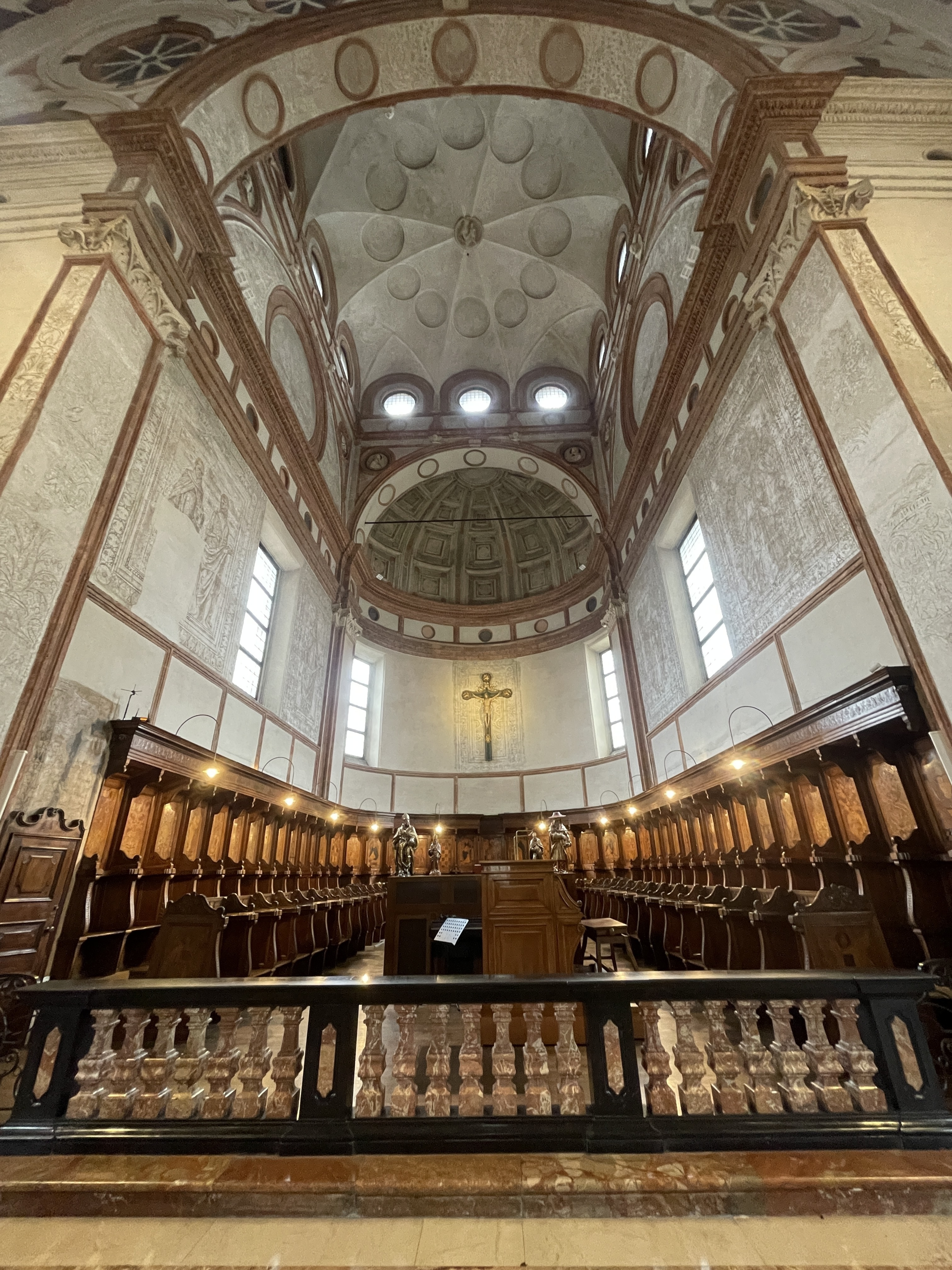
View of the choir and tribune

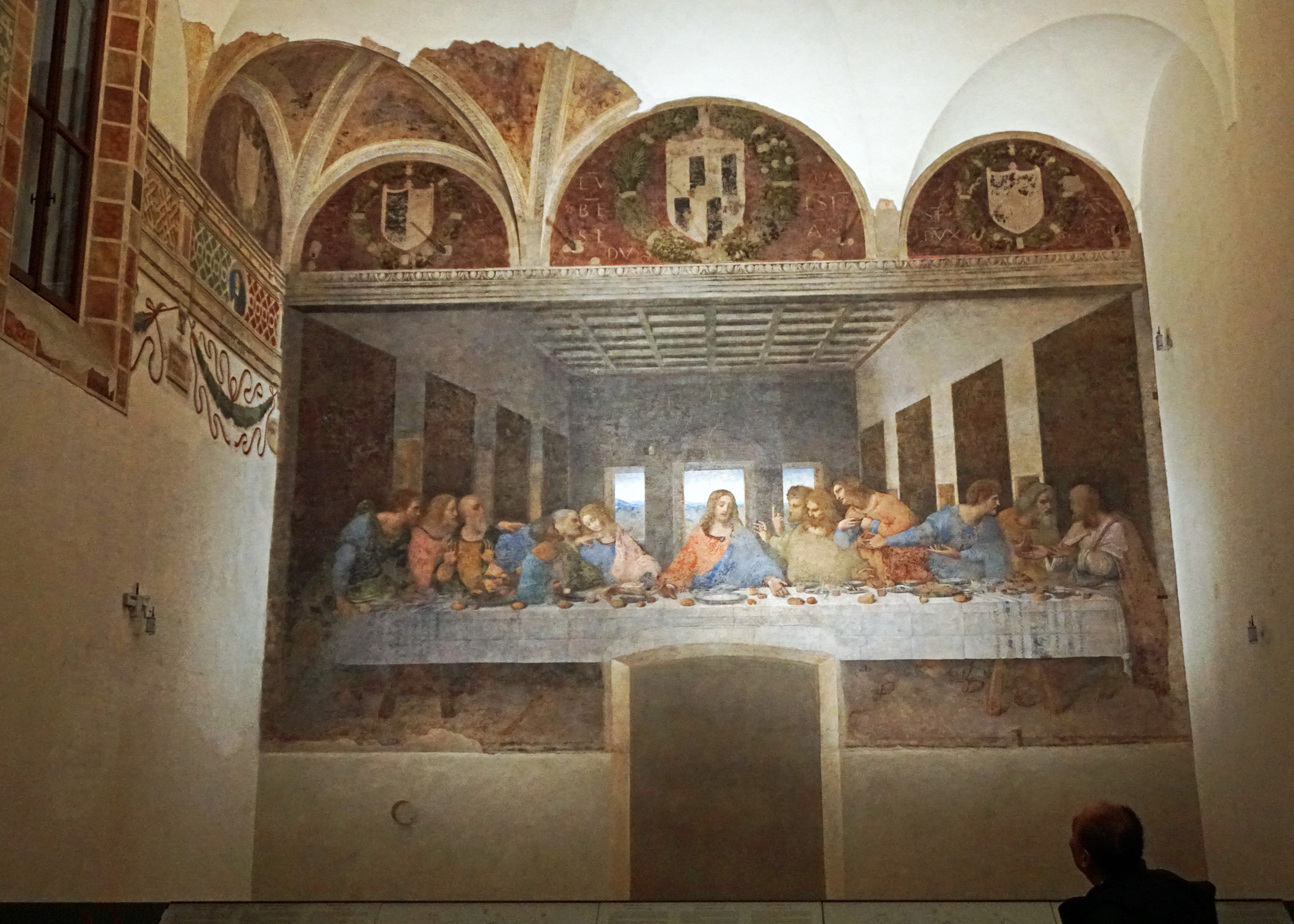
Leonardo da Vinci's Last Supper, as it appears on the refectory wall

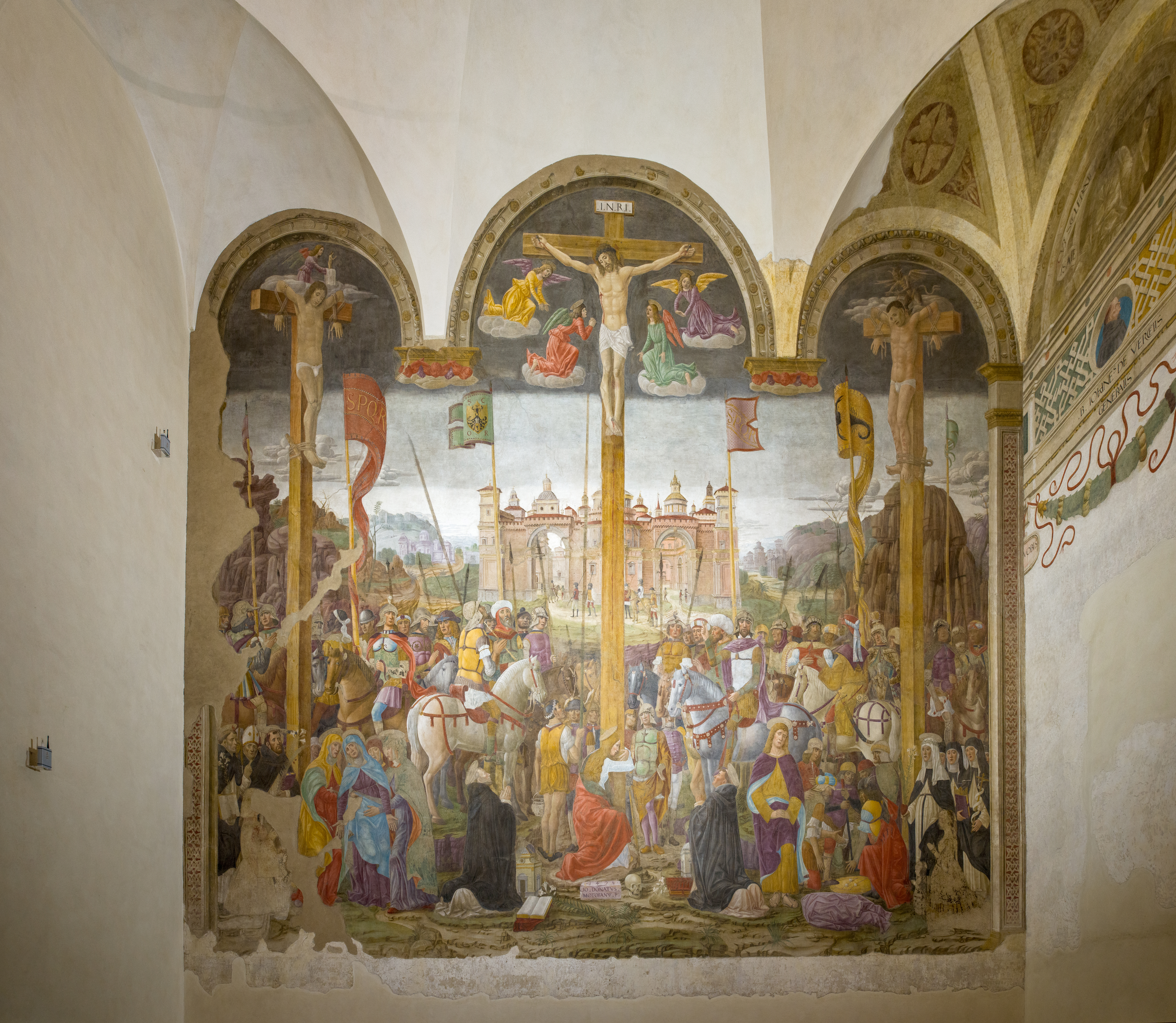
Crucifixion by Giovanni Donato da Montorfano, 1495, opposite Leonardo's Last Supper

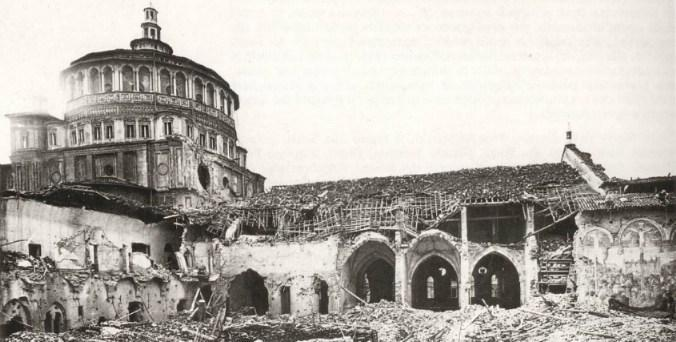
Results of the Allied raid in 1943

== See also ==
- Roman Catholic Marian churches
- Late medieval domes
- Italian Renaissance domes
