= 1618 in art =

The Waterseller of Seville
- Artist: Diego Velázquez
- Year: 1618
- Medium: Oil on canvas
- Dimensions: 104 cm × 75 cm (41 in × 30 in)
- Location: Uffizi, Florence

Events from the year 1618 in art.

== Works ==
- Anthony van Dyck
  - Saint Martin Dividing his Cloak
- Jacob Jordaens
  - The Adoration of the Shepherds
  - Meleager and Atalanta
- Peter Paul Rubens
  - Charles the Bold
  - The Rape of the Daughters of Leucippus
  - The Union of Earth and Water (approximate year)
- Diego Velázquez
  - Christ in the House of Martha and Mary
  - The Farmers' Lunch
  - Old Woman Cooking Eggs
  - Three Musicians
  - The Waterseller of Seville (original version)

== Births ==
- January 1 (baptized) – Bartolomé Esteban Murillo, Spanish painter (died 1682)
- June 28 – Jean Le Pautre, French designer and engraver (died 1682)
- September 11 – Francesco Grue, Italian potter and painter (died 1673)
- September 14 – Peter Lely, Dutch portrait painter (died 1680)
- date unknown
  - Carlo Cane, Italian painter of the Baroque period (died 1688)
  - Gioseffo Danedi, Italian painter (died 1689)
  - Giovanni Battista Galestruzzi, Italian painter and etcher (died 1677)
  - Cornelis Holsteyn, Dutch painter of historical allegories, portraits, and interior decorations (died 1658)
  - Hishikawa Moronobu, Japanese painter (died 1694)
  - Gong Xian, Chinese painter (died 1689)
  - Giovanni Pietro Possenti, Italian painter of battle scenes (died 1659)
  - Pieter Hermansz Verelst, Dutch Golden Age genre art painter (died 1678)
- probable
  - (born 1608/1618) Ginevra Cantofoli, Italian painter (died 1672)
  - (born 1618/1621) – Jacopo Chiavistelli, Italian painter of quadratura (died 1698)

== Deaths ==
- February 21 – Vittorio Baldini, Italian engraver
- April 8 – Antonio Marziale Carracci, Italian painter (born 1583)
- May 24 – Cornelis IJsbrantsz Cussens, Dutch draughtsman and glass painter (born 1580)
- June 29 – Adriaen Collaert, Flemish engraver (born 1560)
- date unknown
  - Luis de Carvajal, Spanish painter of the Renaissance period (born 1531)
  - Ambrosius Francken I, Flemish painter (born 1544)
  - Giovanni Guerra, Italian draughtsman and painter (born 1544)
  - Paolo Camillo Landriani, Italian painter (born c. 1560)
  - Pietro Malombra, Italian painter (born 1556)
  - Giulio Mazzoni, Italian painter and stuccoist (born 1525)
  - Fillide Melandroni, Italian courtesan, model for Caravaggio (born 1581)
  - Camillo Rizzi (or Ricci), Italian painter (born 1580)
  - Ercole Setti, Italian engraver (born 1530)
  - Unkoku Togan, Japanese painter (born 1547)
  - Maffeo Verona, Italian painter (born 1576)
