= 1664 in art =

Events from the year 1664 in art.

== Events ==
- Approximate date - Isaac Fuller executes ceiling paintings in the chapels of All Souls and Magdalen College, Oxford, England.

== Paintings ==
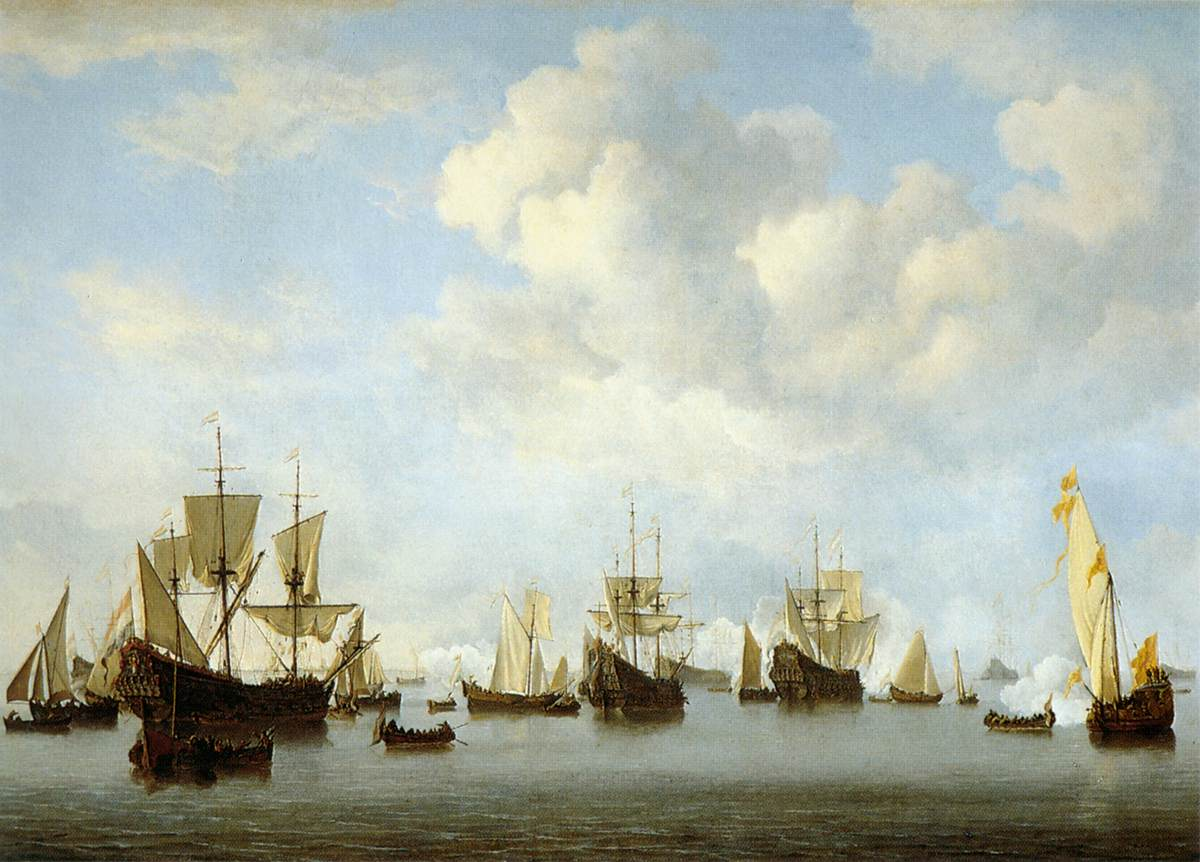
van de Velde – The Dutch Fleet in the Goeree Straits (Guinea), Thyssen-Bornemisza Museum

- Frans Hals - Regents of the Old Men's Almshouse
- Claude Lorrain - Landscape with Psyche outside the Palace of Cupid (The Enchanted Castle)
- Daniel Schultz - Crimean Falconer of King John II Casimir with his Family
- Willem van de Velde the Younger - The Dutch Fleet in the Goeree Straits (Guinea)
- Samuel Dirksz van Hoogstraten - Trompe-l'œil Still Life

== Births ==
- May 20 - Andreas Schlüter, German baroque sculptor and architect in the Petrine Baroque style (died 1714)
- June 3 - Rachel Ruysch, Dutch artist who specialized in still-life paintings of flowers (died 1750)
- December 26 - Johann Melchior Dinglinger, one of Europe's greatest goldsmiths, German artist in a Mannerist tradition into the "Age of Rococo" (died 1731)
- date unknown
  - Giuseppe Alberti, Italian painter (died 1716)
  - Ferrante Amendola, Italian historical painter (died 1724)
  - Juan Bautista Bayuco, Spanish religious-themed painter (died unknown)
  - Philipp Ferdinand de Hamilton, painter from the Southern Netherlands active in Austria (died 1750)
  - Guglielmo da Leoni, Italian painter and engraver (died 1740)
  - Rolando Marchelli, Italian painter from Genoa (died unknown)
  - Alessandro Marchesini, Italian painter of allegories with small figures (died 1738)
  - Mehmet Emin Tokadi, Ottoman Sufi saint, writer, calligrapher, and scholar (died 1745)
  - Pablo González Velázquez, Spanish Baroque painter (died 1727)
- probable - Torii Kiyonobu I, Japanese painter and printmaker in the ukiyo-e style, especially on Kabuki signboards (died 1729)

== Deaths ==
- February John Hoskins, English miniature painter (date of birth unknown)
- April 4 - Adam Willaerts, Dutch painter (born 1577)
- May 5 - Giovanni Benedetto Castiglione, Italian painter (born 1609)
- May 11 - Salomon de Bray (or Braij), Dutch painter (born 1597)
- July 12 - Stefano della Bella, Italian printmaker known for etchings of many subjects, including military ones (born 1610)
- August 3 - Jacopo Vignali, Florentine painter (born 1592)
- August 27
  - Cornelis Pietersz Bega (the "Little Master"), Dutch painter, etcher and draughtsman (born 1631)
  - Francisco de Zurbarán, Spanish painter (born 1598)
- date unknown
  - Michel Corneille the Elder, French painter, etcher, and engraver (born 1601)
  - Jacob Heinrich Elbfas, Livonia-born portraitist (born 1600)
- probable
  - Lan Ying, Chinese painter of landscapes, human figures, flowers and birds during the Ming Dynasty (born 1585)
  - (died 1664/1673) Antonio Maria Vassallo, Italian painter of mythological scenes and still lifes (born 1620)
  - Reinier Nooms, Dutch maritime painter and etcher (born c. 1623)
- possible – Jan Pieter Brueghel, Flemish Baroque painter (born 1628)
