= 1581 in art =

| List of years in art | (table) |
- … 1571; 1572; 1573; 1574; 1575; 1576; 1577; 1578; 1579; 1580; 1581; 1582; 1583; 1584; 1585; 1586; 1587; 1588; 1589; 1590; 1591 …
- Art; Archaeology; Architecture; Literature; Music; Philosophy; Science; +...

Events from the year 1581 in art.

== Events ==
- September 19 – Arnold Bronckhorst is appointed first court painter to James VI of Scotland.
- Construction of the Uffizi in Florence as magistrates' offices, designed by Giorgio Vasari and continued by Alfonso Parigi the Elder and Bernardo Buontalenti, is completed.

== Works ==
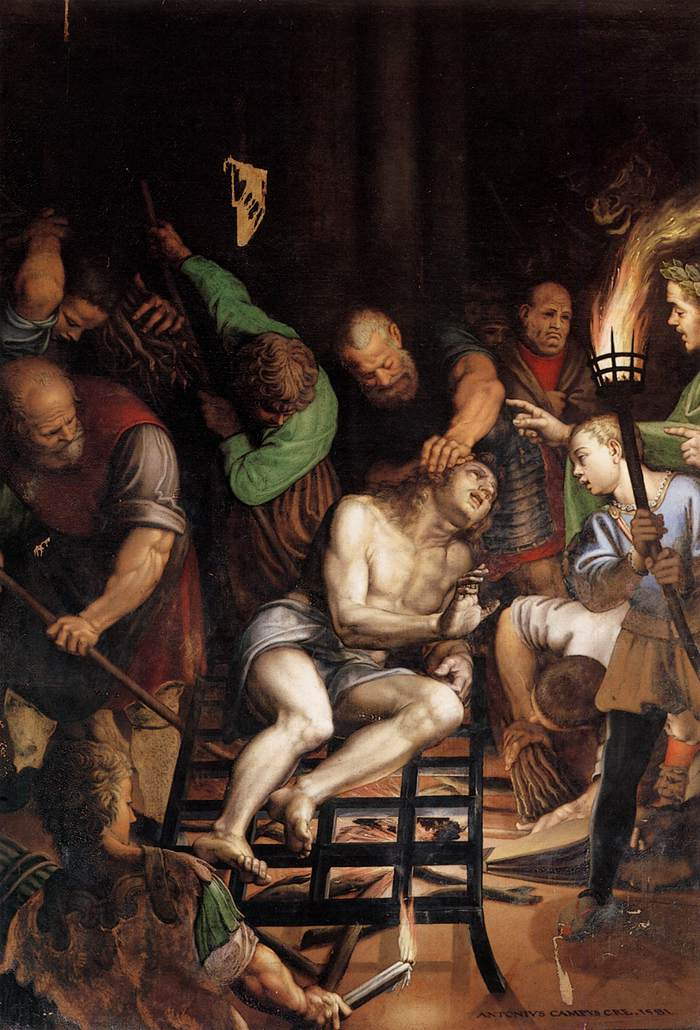
Campi – The Martyrdom of St. Lawrence

- Anonymous – Portrait of Dorothy and Penelope Devereux (approximate date)
- Antonio Campi – The Martyrdom of St. Lawrence (San Paolo Converso, Milan)
- Lavinia Fontana
  - Deposition
  - Noli me tangere
- Nicholas Hilliard – Portrait miniature of Sir Francis Drake

== Births ==
- October 21 – Domenico Zampieri, Baroque Italian painter (died 1641)
- December 27 - Jean Chalette, French miniature and portrait painter (died 1643)
- date unknown
  - Johan Bara, Dutch painter, designer and engraver (died 1634)
  - Frans Francken the Younger, Flemish painter (died 1642)
  - Cornelis Liefrinck, Dutch painter (died 1652)
  - Abraham Matthijs, Flemish Baroque painter (died 1649)
  - Fillide Melandroni, Italian courtesan, model for Caravaggio (died 1618)
  - Panfilo Nuvolone, Italian Mannerist painter (died 1651)
  - Carlo Sellitto, Italian Caravaggisti painter (died 1614)
  - Artus Wolffort, Flemish painter (died 1641)
- probable
  - Bernardo Strozzi, Italian painter (died 1644)

== Deaths ==
- September 19 - Frans Pourbus the Elder, Flemish Renaissance painter primarily of religious and portraits (born 1545)
- date unknown
  - Girolamo Comi, Italian Renaissance painter (born 1507)
