= 1698 in art =

Events from the year 1698 in art.

== Events ==
- September – Maximilian II Emanuel, Prince-Elector of Bavaria, purchases Rubens' Adoration of the Magi from Gijsbert van Ceulen.

== Works ==
- Nicolò Fumo – Fallen Christ (wooden sculpture)
- Hyacinthe Rigaud – Self-portrait in a turban

== Births ==
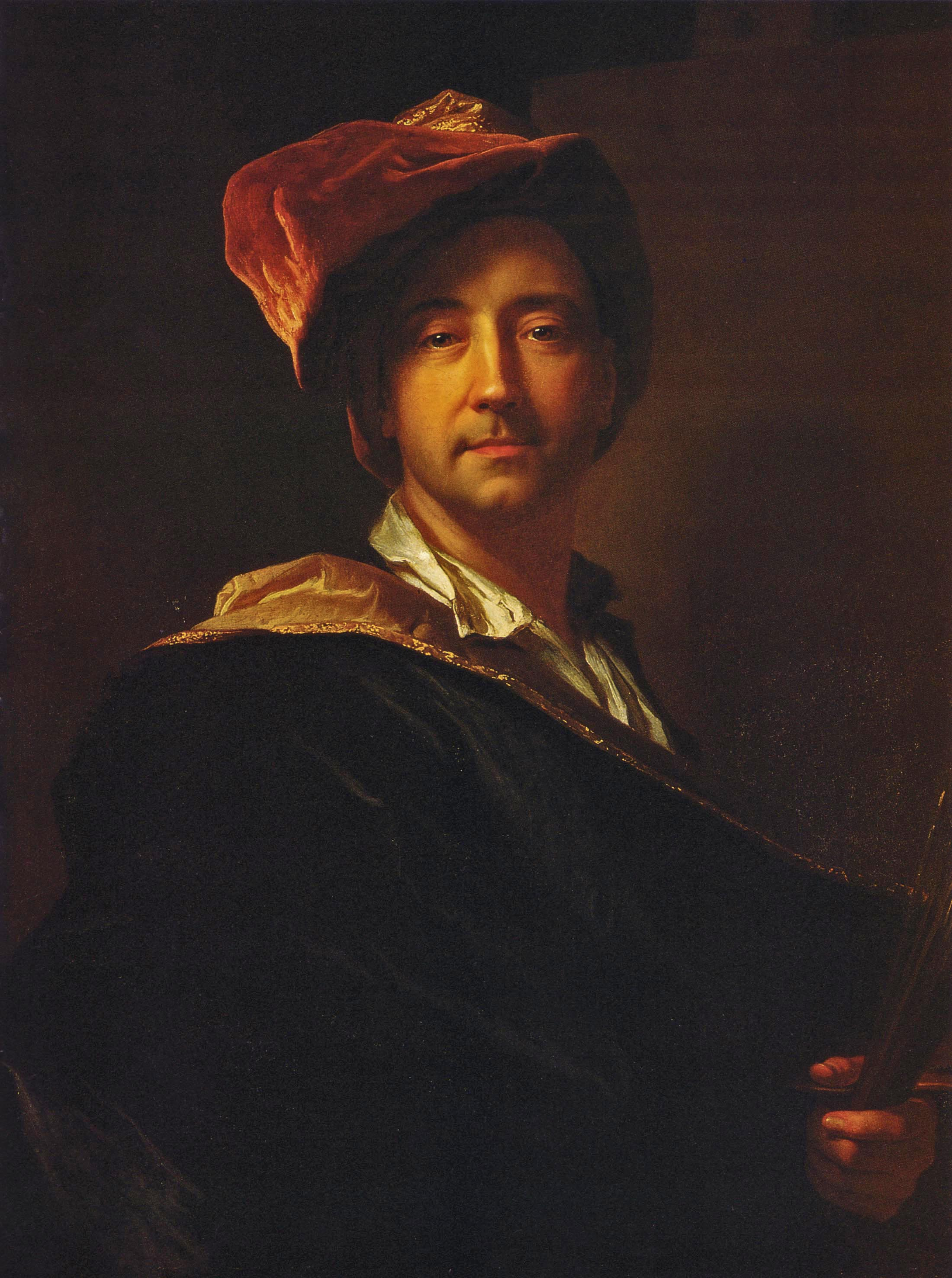
Rigaud – Self-portrait in a turban

- May 17 – Gio Nicola Buhagiar, Maltese painter (died 1752)
- May 29 – Edmé Bouchardon, French sculptor (died 1762)
- September 15 – Pier Francesco Guala, Italian painter active for the most part in the region of his place of birth, Casale Monferrato (died 1757)
- October 13 – Giacomo Ceruti, Italian painter of peasants (died 1767)
- October 30 – Paul Troger, Austrian painter, draughtsman and printmaker (died 1762)
- date unknown
  - Benoît Audran the Younger, French engraver (died 1772)
  - Gaudenzio Botti, Italian painter, mainly active in Brescia (died 1778)
  - Felice Cappelletti, Italian painter active in Verona (died 1738)
  - Antonio David, Italian portrait painter, especially of the House of Stuart (died 1750)
  - Filippo della Valle, Italian sculptor (died 1768)
  - Louis de Moni, Dutch genre painter (died 1771)
  - Franz Xaver Feuchtmayer, German Baroque stucco plasterer of the Wessobrunner School (died 1763)
  - Johann Preissler, engraver (died 1771)
- probable
  - Giovanni Francesco Braccioli, Italian painter, mainly active in Ferrara (died 1762)
  - Susanna Drury, Irish painter chiefly noted for her watercolours (died 1770)

== Deaths ==
- April 27 – Jacopo Chiavistelli, Italian painter of quadratura (born 1618/1621)
- June 1 – Maurelio Scanavini, Italian painter, mainly active in Ferrara (born 1665)
- June 10 – Gerrit Adriaenszoon Berckheyde, Dutch artist (born 1638)
- September 21 – Catherine Duchemin, French flower and fruit painter (born 1630)
- October 6 – Johann Carl Loth, German painter active in Venice (born 1632)
- November – Rombout Verhulst, sculptor from Brabant (born 1624)
- December 16 – Simone Pignoni, Italian painter of both licentious then later pious works (born 1611)
- date unknown
  - Francesco Barbieri, Italian painter (born 1623)
  - Johann Anton Eismann, Austrian painter (born 1604)
  - Teresa Maria Languasco, Italian painter and a monk (born 1651)
  - Hâfiz Osman, Ottoman calligrapher (born 1642)
  - Pieter Peutemans, Dutch Golden Age painter (born 1641)
  - Zha Shibiao, landscape painter and calligrapher from Anhui (born 1615)
