= 1651 in art =

Events from the year 1651 in art.

== Events ==
- Fontana dei Quattro Fiumi or "Fountain of the Four Rivers" completed by Gian Lorenzo Bernini

== Paintings ==
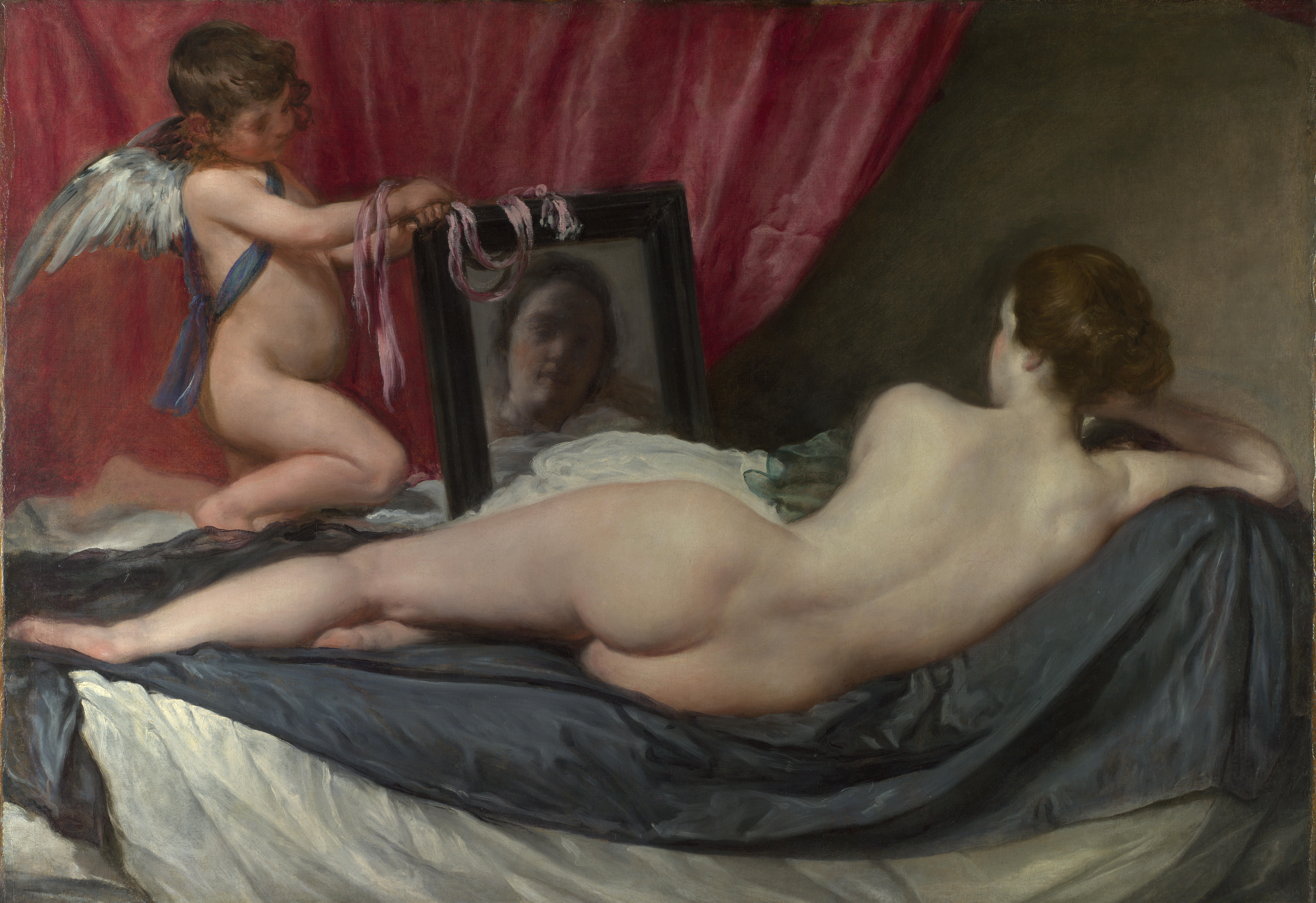
Velázquez, The Rokeby Venus

- David Bailly – Self-portrait with Vanitas symbols
- Guercino - The Libyan Sibyl
- Jacob Jordaens – The Triumph of Frederik Hendrik
- Nicolas Poussin
  - The Finding of Moses
  - The Holy Family
- Salvator Rosa – Democritus amid the Tombs
- David Teniers the Younger – Erzherzog Leopold Wilhelm in seiner Galerie in Brüssel ("Archduke Leopold William in his Gallery at Brussels")
- Diego Velázquez – The Rokeby Venus (c.1647-1651)

== Births ==
- August 13 - Balthasar Permoser, Austrian sculptor (died 1732)
- date unknown
  - Niccolò Bambini, Italian painter of the late-Renaissance and early-Baroque periods (died 1736)
  - Teresa Maria Languasco, Italian painter and monk (died 1698)
  - Willem van Ingen, Dutch Golden Age painter active in Italy (died 1708)
  - François-Alexandre Verdier, French painter, draftsman and engraver (died 1730)

== Deaths ==
- January - Jacob Franquart, Flemish painter, court architect and copper plate engraver (born 1582)
- January 27 - Abraham Bloemaert, painter (born 1566)
- May 9 - Cornelis de Vos, Flemish painter (born 1584)
- August 16 - Henricus Hondius II, Dutch engraver, cartographer and publisher (born 1597)
- August 27 – Jacob Adriaensz Backer, Dutch painter (born 1609)
- September 12 - Felix Castello, Spanish painter (born 1595)
- November 22 - Giovanni Battista Soria, Italian architect (born 1581)
- December 6 - Anna Visscher, Dutch artist, poet, and translator (born 1584)
- date unknown
  - Friedrich Brentel, German printmaker in engraving and etching, and miniature painter (born 1580)
  - Giovanni Domenico Cappellino Italian painter, active mainly in his native Genoa (born 1580)
  - Dirck Cornelis de Hooch, Dutch portrait painter (born 1613)
  - Panfilo Nuvolone, Italian Mannerist painter (born 1581)
  - Kanō Sansetsu, Japanese painter (born 1589)
  - John Taylor, portrait painter (born 1585)
  - Jan van den Hoecke, Antwerp painter and draftsman (born 1611)
  - Floris van Dyck, Dutch still life painter (born 1575)
  - Joris van Schooten, Dutch Golden Age painter (born 1587)
- probable - Francesco Guarino, Italian painter active mainly in Irpinia (born 1611)
