= 1507 in art =

Events from the year 1507 in art.

== Works ==
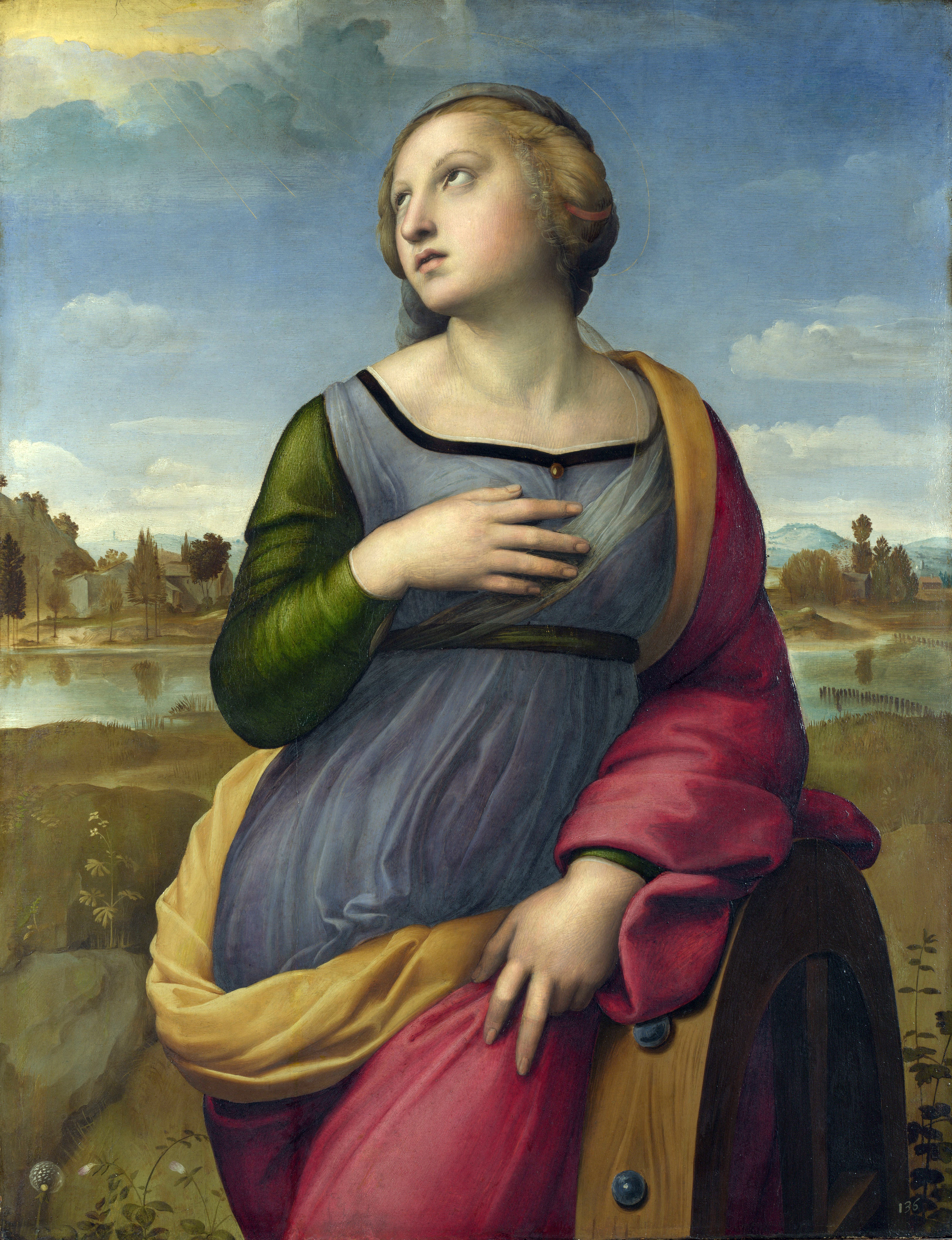
Raphael, St. Catherine of Alexandria

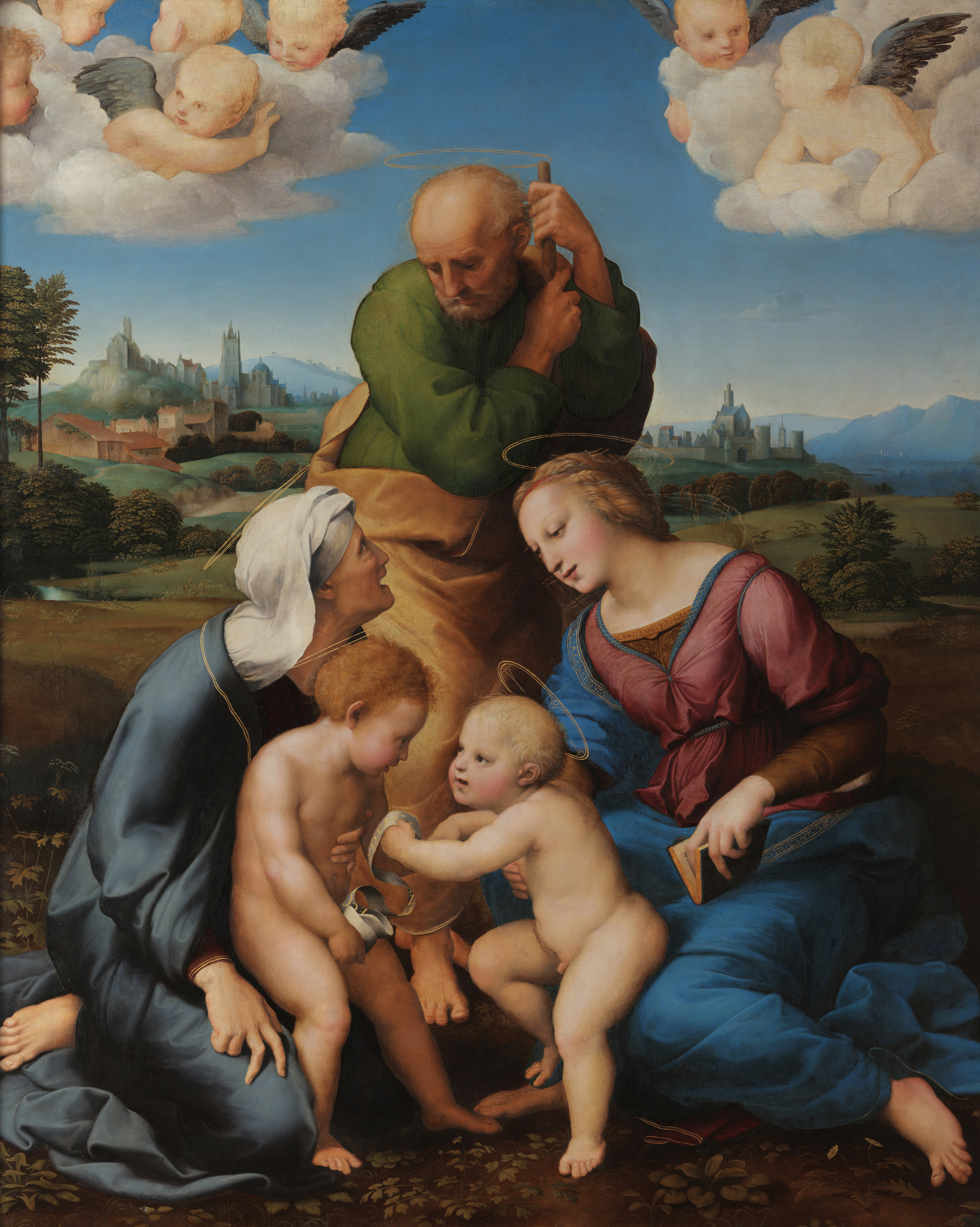
Raphael, Canigiani Holy Family

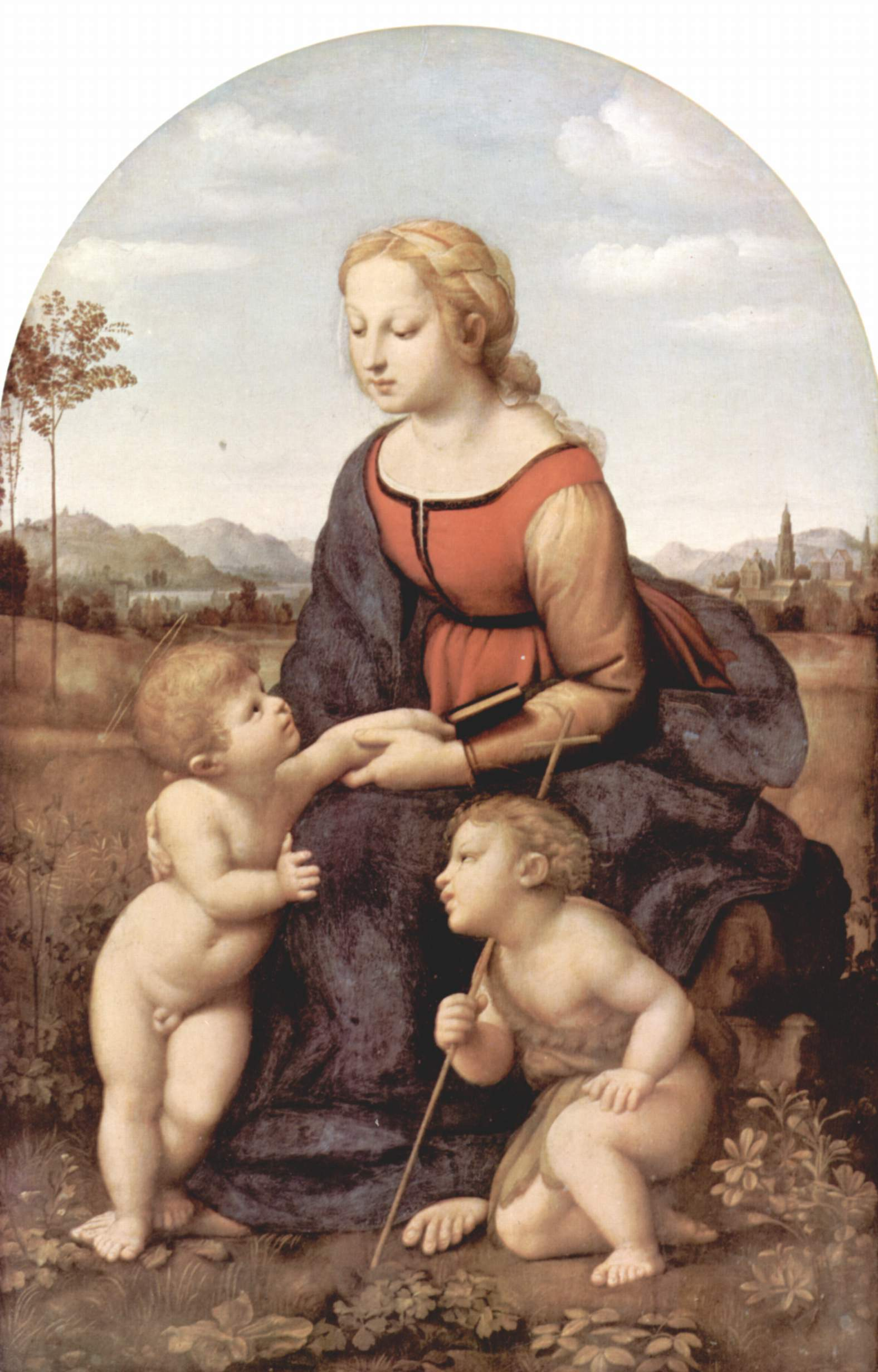
Raphael, La belle jardinière

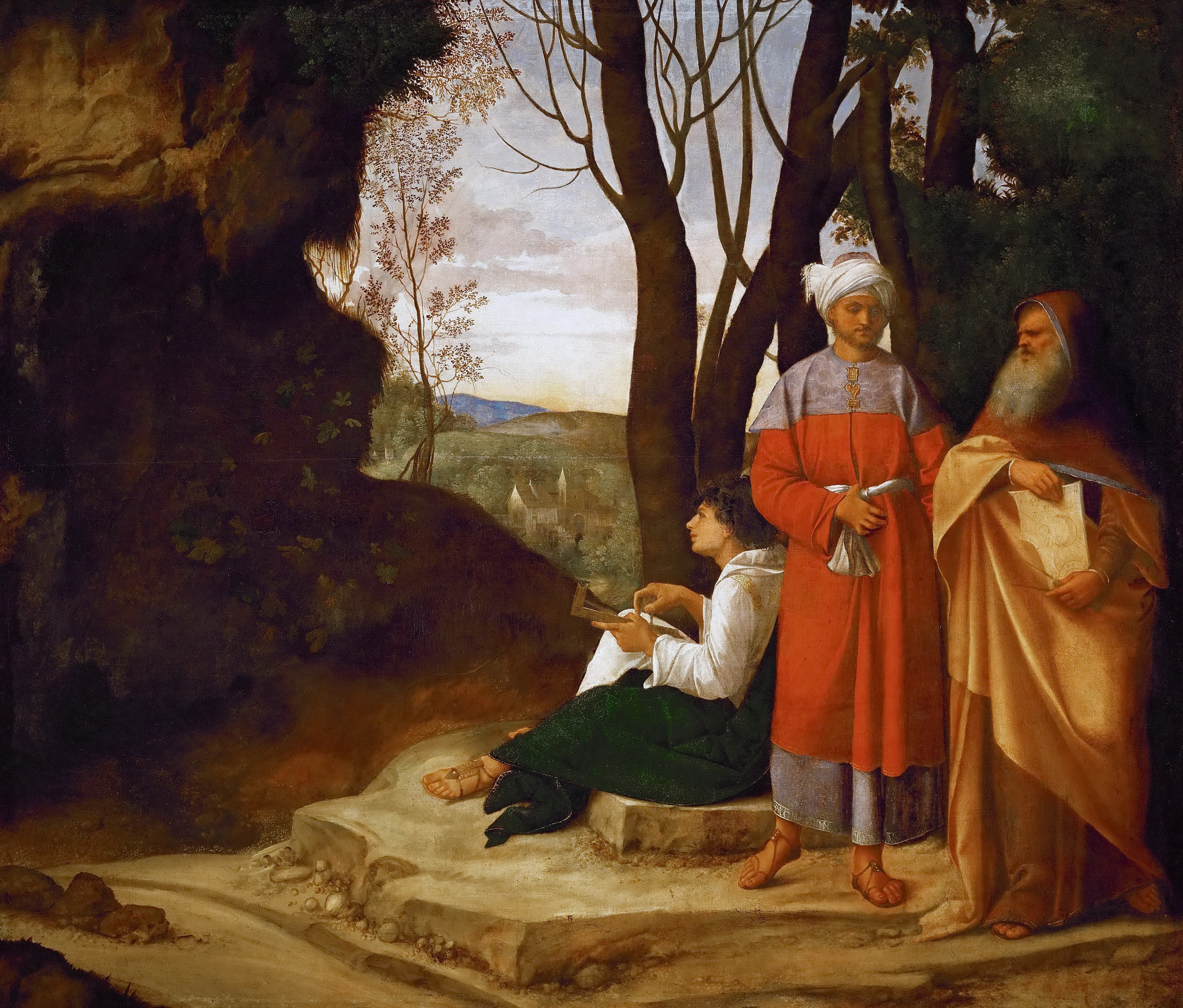
Giorgione, The Three Philosophers

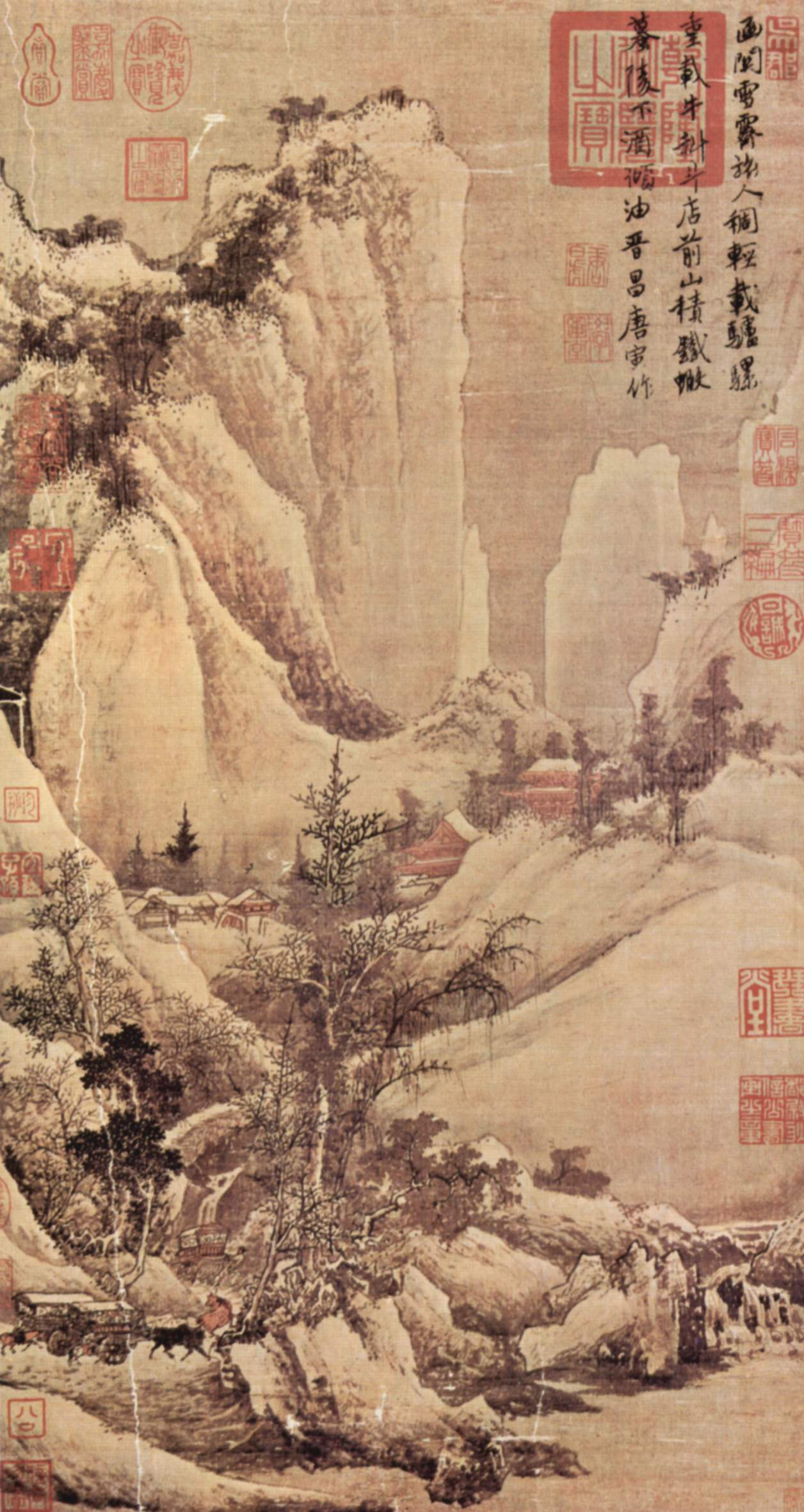
Tang Yin, Clearing after Snow on a Mountain Pass

=== Painting ===
- Vittore Carpaccio
  - St. Augustine in His Study (Scuola di San Giorgio degli Schiavoni, Venice)
  - St. George Baptizing the Selenites
  - St. Thomas in Glory between St Mark and St Louis of Toulouse
- Albrecht Dürer
  - Adam and Eve
  - Avarice
- Giorgione – The Three Philosophers
- Leonardo da Vinci – Salvator Mundi (approximate date)
- Filippino Lippi, finished by Pietro Perugino – Annunziata Polyptych
- Michelangelo – Doni Tondo (approximate date of completion)
- Pietro Perugino – Baptism of Jesus (Oratory of Nunziatella, Foligno)
- Raphael
  - Ansidei Madonna
  - La belle jardinière
  - Canigiani Holy Family
  - The Deposition
  - Madonna of the Pinks
  - Saint Catherine of Alexandria
- Tang Yin – Clearing after Snow on a Mountain Pass

== Births ==
- Pierre Bontemps, French sculptor known for his funeral monuments during the French Renaissance (died 1562)
- Girolamo Comi, Italian Renaissance painter (died 1581)
- Juan de Juni, French–Spanish sculptor (died 1577)
- Luca Longhi, Italian painter (died 1580)
- Juan Vicente Macip (or Vicente Joanes Masip or Macip), Spanish painter, head of the Valencian school of painters (died 1579)
- Luca Martini, Italian arts patron (died 1561)
- Jacopo Strada, Italian painter, architect, goldsmith, inventor of machines, numismatist, linguist, collector and merchant of works of art (died 1588)
- 1507/1508: Wenzel Jamnitzer, Northern Mannerist goldsmith, artist, and printmaker in etching (died 1585)

== Deaths ==
- February 23 – Gentile Bellini, Italian painter (born 1429)
- date unknown
  - Rueland Frueauf the Elder, Austrian late-Gothic painter (born 1440)
  - Fernando Gallego, Spanish painter brought up in an age of gothic style (born 1440)
  - Albertus Pictor, Swedish mural painter (born c. 1440)
  - Cosimo Rosselli, Italian painter of the Quattrocento, active mainly in Florence (born 1439)
