= 1564 in art =

Events from the year 1564 in art.

== Events ==
- February 18 – Michelangelo dies aged 88 in Rome leaving the Rondanini Pietà unfinished.

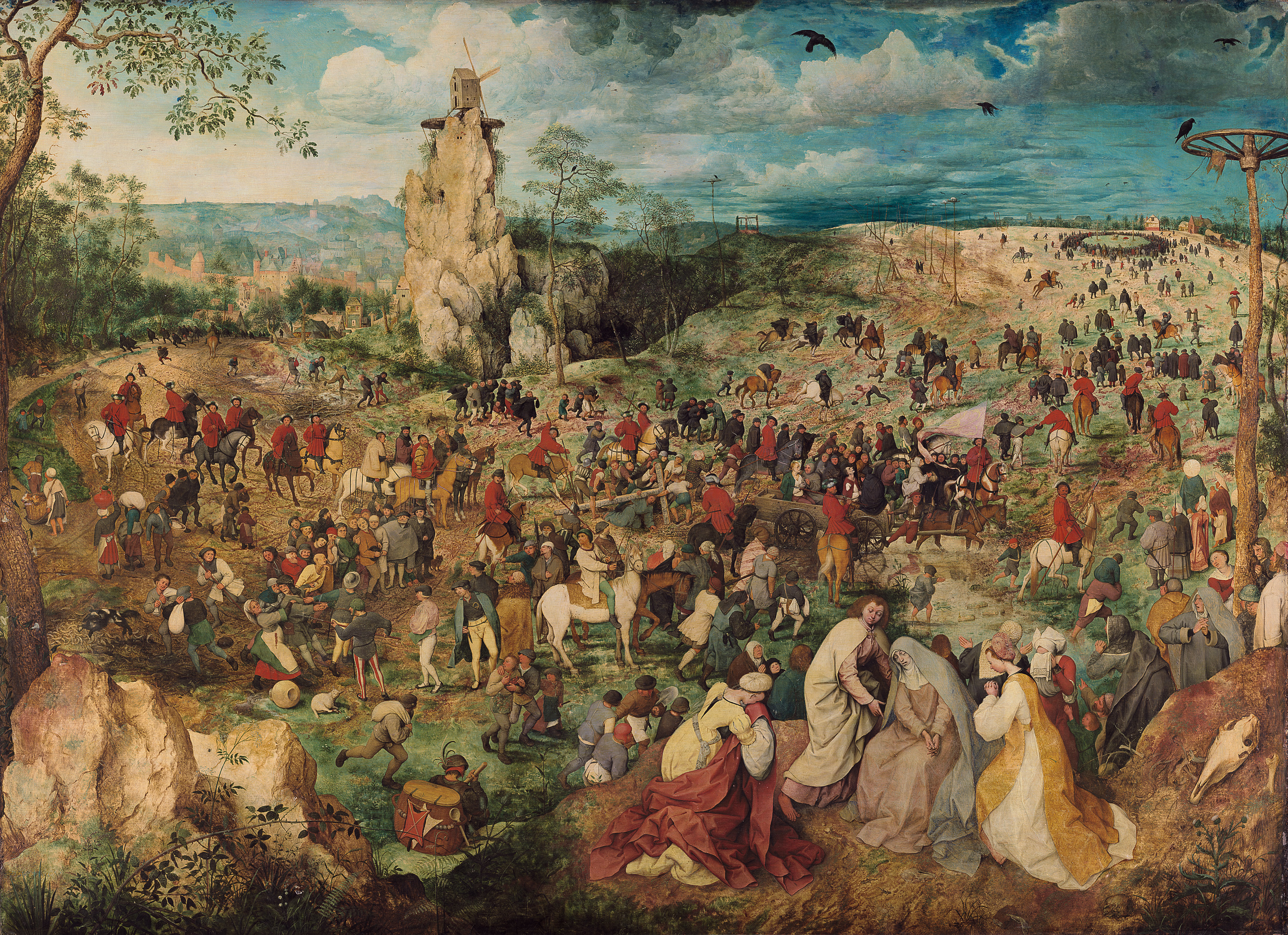
Bruegel - The Procession to Calvary

== Paintings ==
- Pieter Bruegel the Elder
  - The Adoration of the Kings
  - The Procession to Calvary

== Births ==
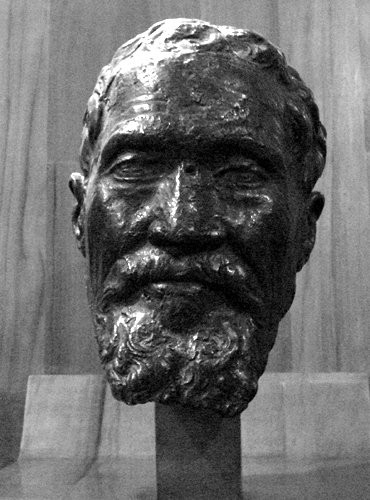
Bust of Michelangelo from a death mask by Daniele da Volterra (1564)

- June 11 - Joseph Heintz the Elder, Swiss painter, draftsman and architect (died 1609)
- September 13 - Vincenzo Giustiniani, art collector, patron of Caravaggio (died 1637)
- November - Francisco Pacheco, Spanish painter and writer on painting (died 1644)
- date unknown
  - Zeng Jing, Chinese painter during the Ming Dynasty (died 1647)
  - Bartolomé González y Serrano, Spanish Baroque portrait painter (died 1627)
  - Hans Rottenhammer, German painter (died 1625)
- probable
  - Pieter Brueghel the Younger, Flemish Renaissance painter (died 1636)
  - Crispijn van de Passe the Elder, Dutch publisher and engraver (died 1637)

== Deaths ==
- February 18 – Michelangelo, Italian Renaissance sculptor, painter, architect and poet (born 1475)
- date unknown
  - Domenico Campagnola, Italian painter and engraver of the Renaissance period (born c.1500); he was a pupil of his father, the painter Giulio Campagnola.
  - Cesare da Bagno, Italian sculptor and medallist (born 1530)
  - Jakob Woller, German sculptor (born 1510)
