= Marchelli =

Marchelli is an Italian surname. Notable people with the surname include:

- Carla Marchelli (born 1935), Italian alpine skier
- Maria Grazia Marchelli (1932–2006), Italian alpine skier
- Rolando Marchelli (1664–?), Italian Baroque painter
