= Peach production in China =

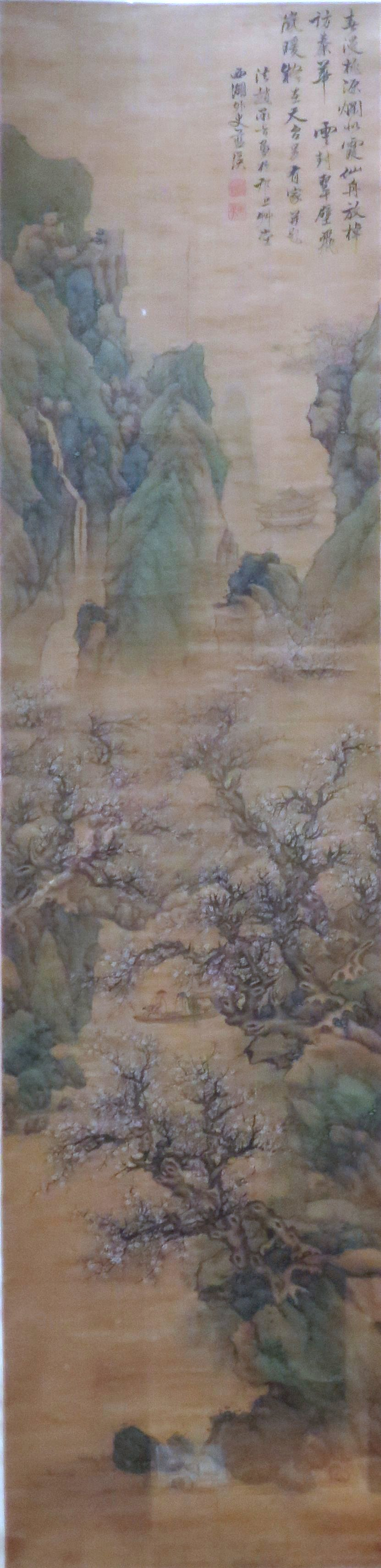
Peach Forest by Lan Ying (1585-1664), late Ming Dynasty

China, the world's leading producer of fruit, is also by far the leading producer of peaches.

According to the Food and Agriculture Organization, as of 2010, peach production in China was 10 million tonnes (11 million short tons), accounting for 50% of world production. Other leading peach producers are Italy (10%), Spain (7%) and the United States (6%). Since most of China's peaches are for domestic consumption, China is not the world's largest exporter of peaches, but instead ranks as the fifth-largest peach exporter, behind Spain, Italy, France and the United States (4th). China's export of peaches to the U.S. during 2010 was valued at about US$55 million.

The peach is indigenous to China, with its historical records traced from fossil stones in Wu County in Jiangsu province, during archaeological excavations. The two types of peaches (Prunus persica, a deciduous fruit) are clingstone and freestone; the history and cultivation of both types have been traced as far back as 1000 BCE in China. They are now grown worldwide.

== History ==
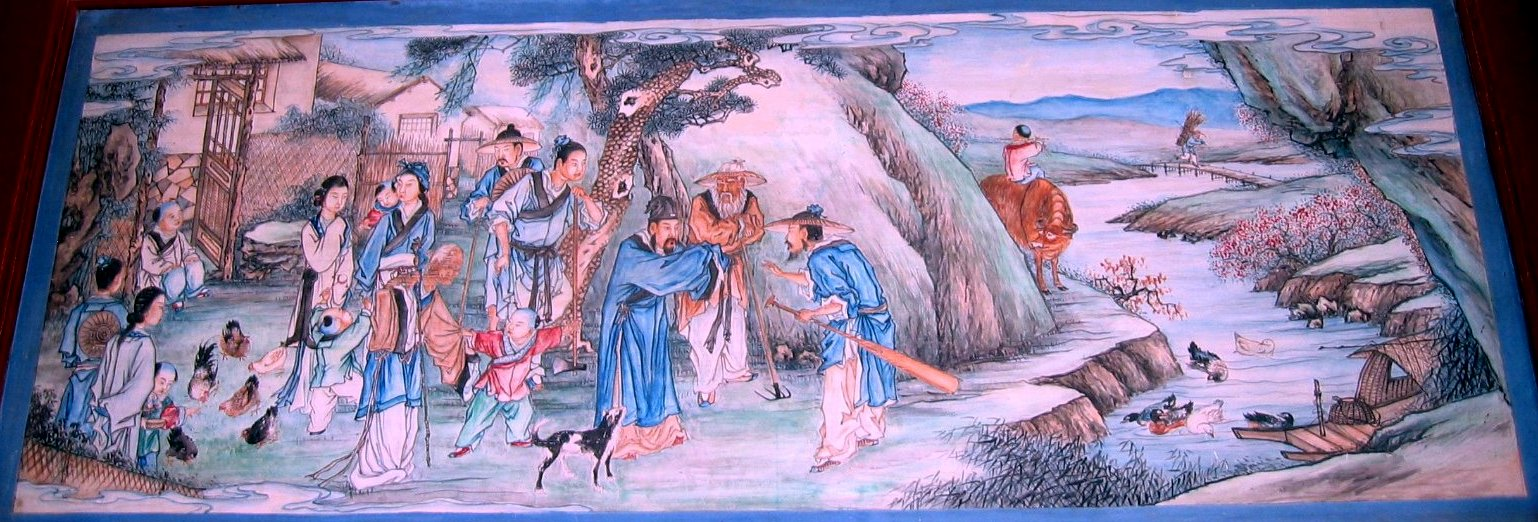
The painting "The Tale of the Peach-Blossom Land" inside of the Long Corridor on the grounds of the Old Summer Palace in Beijing, China.

Although its botanical name Prunus persica suggests that the peach is native to Persia, peaches actually originated in China, where they have been cultivated since the early days of Chinese culture.

Recent evidence indicates that peach domestication occurred as far back as 6000 BC in Zhejiang Province of China. The oldest archaeological peach stones are from the Kuahuqiao site near Hangzhou.

According to archaeologists,

Five populations of archaeological peach stones recovered from Zhejiang Province, China, document peach use and evolution beginning ca. 8000 BP. The majority of the archaeological sites from which the earliest peach stones have been recovered are from the Yangzi River valley, indicating that this is where early selection for favorable peach varieties likely took place.

Peaches were mentioned in Chinese writings and literature beginning from the early 1st millennium BC. Peaches play an important role in Chinese mythology and history and were said to have magical powers. Peaches are mentioned in many ancient pieces of Chinese literature and art, such as Tao Yuanming's The Tale of the Peach-Blossom Spring.

In addition, the results of archaeological excavations in Banpo village, Xi'an, Shaanxi Province support references in ancient manuscripts to 17 different fruits, mostly deciduous and including peaches, beginning with Shi Jing, an ancient record of songs scripted in 1000 BC. Archaeological finds testify to a well-developed agricultural knowledge base in pomology. The Chinese knew about cultivar differences in winter peaches in the second century BC.

== Cultivation ==
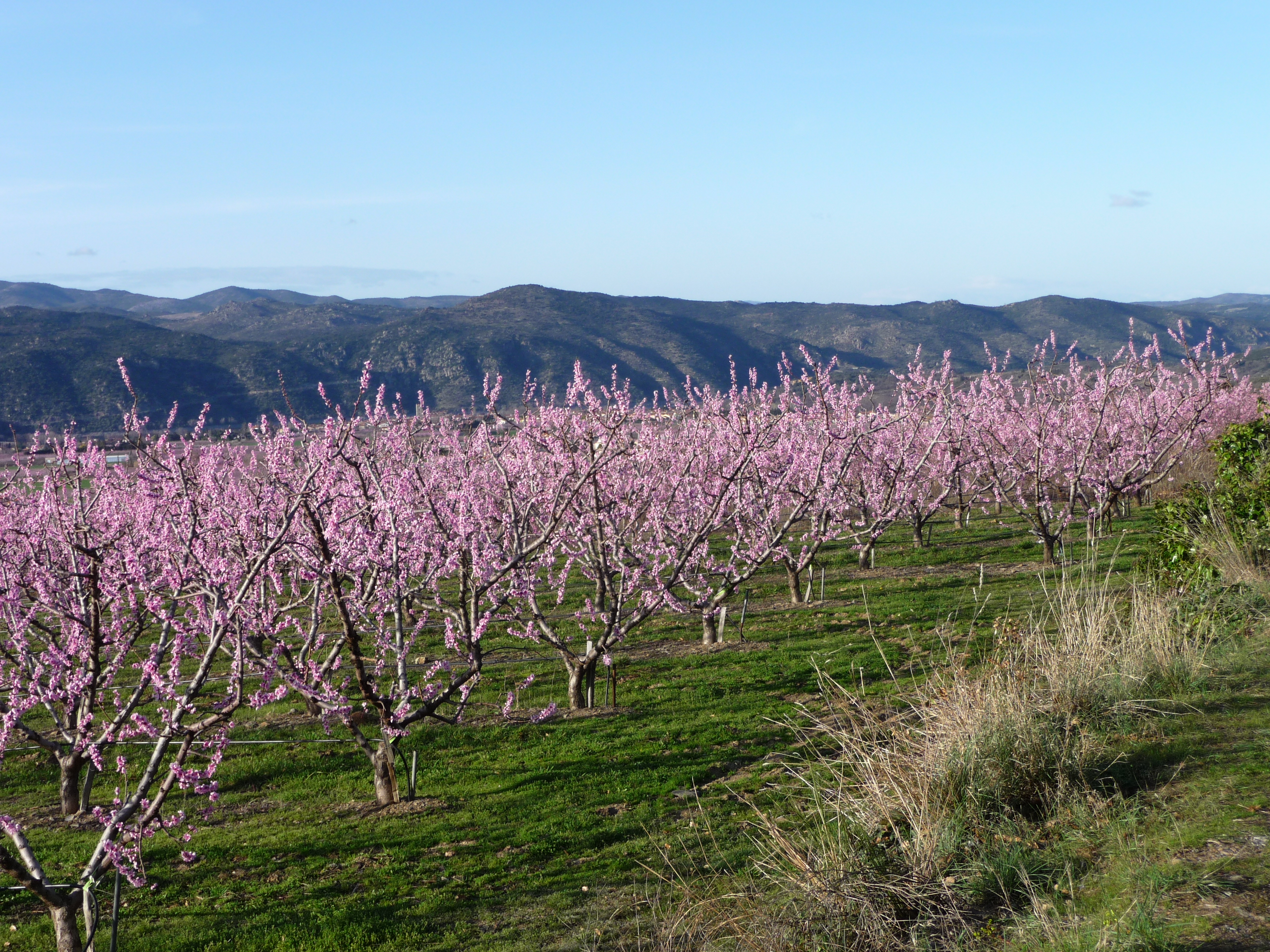
Peach blossoms

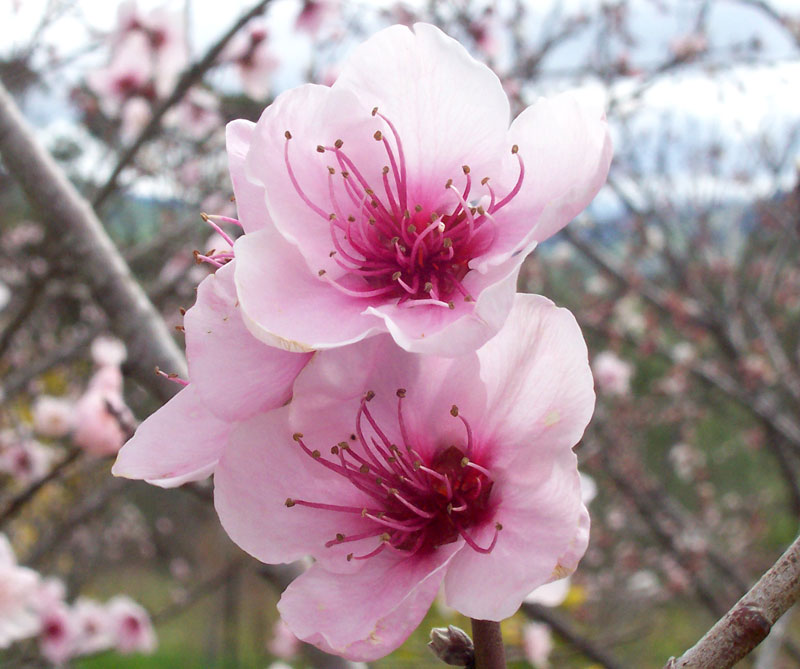
Peach flowers

Peach production is largely concentrated in northern, central to eastern and north-western China, although a significant part of the country grows them. In general, peach production in China can be divided into seven regions based on regional climate and ecological differences. These main areas of production are Northwest in Xinjiang, Ningxia, Shaanxi and Gansu; the Northern China plains in Beijing, Tianjing, Hebei, southern Liaoning, Shandong, Shanxi, Henan, Jiangsu and northern Anhui, especially along the Huai River; the humid Yangtze region in the centre and east in southern Jiangsu, Zhejiang, Shanghai, southern Anhui, Jiangxi and Hubei; the Yunnan-Guizhou high plateau in Yunnan, Guizhou and southwest Sichuan; the Qinghai-Tibet cold plateau; the cold northeast in Jilin and Heilongjiang; and finally the subtropical region of Southern China, particularly to the south of the Yangtze, in the provinces of Fujian, Jiangxi, southern Hunan, north Guangdong, north Guangxi and Taiwan.

Peach/nectarine production for the year 2010 (January to December) was reported to be 10 million tonnes from an area of 6,850 square kilometres (2,640 sq mi). While the area decreased by 1% over the previous year, production recorded an increase of 2%. In the well-managed areas of Shadang, yield was reported at 3.5 tonnes per mu (5,200 t/km^{2}). Export forecast for 2010 was 52,000 tonnes, an increase of 30% over the previous year; this is attributed to better cold storage facilities and increase in demand from Southeast Asia, Central Europe and Russia.

=== Cultivars ===
The native peach of China is categorised under two major groups, namely, the cultivars and the ecotypes. North China has the Mitao cultivars, which bear larger fruits with a firm flesh. These are grown in Feicheng and Yidou in Shandong province, Shenzhou in Hebei province, Liquan and Fuping in Shaanxi province and Zhenging and Zhangye in Gansu province. Other major cultivars are Feicheng Tao, Shenzhou Mitao and Yidou Mitao. The Shuimitao peach, also known as the Water Honey peach, is grown extensively in the Yangtze River basin areas in South China. These cultivars are well adapted to conditions in the Yangtze River basin, which has suitable wet climatic conditions with high summer temperatures. They have tender flesh and are juicy, with high sugar content. Fenghua yulu and Baihua shuimi cultivars are popular in areas close to the cities of Nanjing, Wuxi, Shanghai, Hangzhou, Ningbo and Fenghua. Areas under production with early peach and nectarine cultivars have increased. The major root stocks used for peaches are Prunus davidiana Franc in Southern China and Prunus persica Stoke in Northern China.

=== Protected systems ===
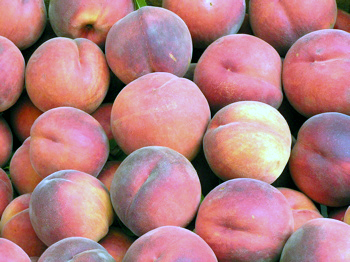
Peach fruits

Since 1959, the peach has also been grown under a protected system innovated by the Shandong Agricultural University which has substantially extended its marketing period. Protected system practices involve the application of chemicals under controlled conditions, setting foliage limits, pruning during summer, girdling during autumn, creating drought stress, pruning roots and use of "dwarfing root stocks and dwarfing or semi-dwarfing cultivars", micro-climate control (temperature, humidity, light, water, CO_{2}:O_{2} ratio, additional illumination, covering with transparent films and use of reflective lights on ground to control air and light in order to induce ripening and improve fruit quality), apart from many other techniques in use of fertilisers, pruning, irrigation, inter-cropping systems and humidity control. The productivity of peach trees in greenhouses using this programme is limited to about 10 years.

== Uses ==
Consumption of peaches within China has increased with marked preferences, people in Shanghai preferring the sweet and juicy variety, while Beijing people prefer the hard-flesh sourish variety. Canned peaches are also becoming popular in urban areas, yellow peaches being the preferred variety for canning.

About 80% of peaches produced are for the domestic fresh market through well organised distribution centres. Fruit is harvested when about 80% ripe and then packed in cardboard boxes before dispatch to marketing centres. Export of fresh white-fleshed melting peach has been a trend in recent years and processed products (such as canned, dried, sliced dry products, juices, tea, beer, fruit jelly and candies) are exported to Europe and the US.

== Bibliography ==
- Layne, Desmond R.; Bassi, Daniele (2008). The Peach: Botany, Production and Uses. CAB International. ISBN 978-1-84593-386-9.
