= 1530 in art =

Events from the year 1530 in art.

== Events ==
- September 15 – Portrait of Saint Dominic in Soriano appears in the Dominican friary at Soriano Calabro, soon acquiring a reputation for having marvellous properties.

== Works ==
Assumption of the Virgin
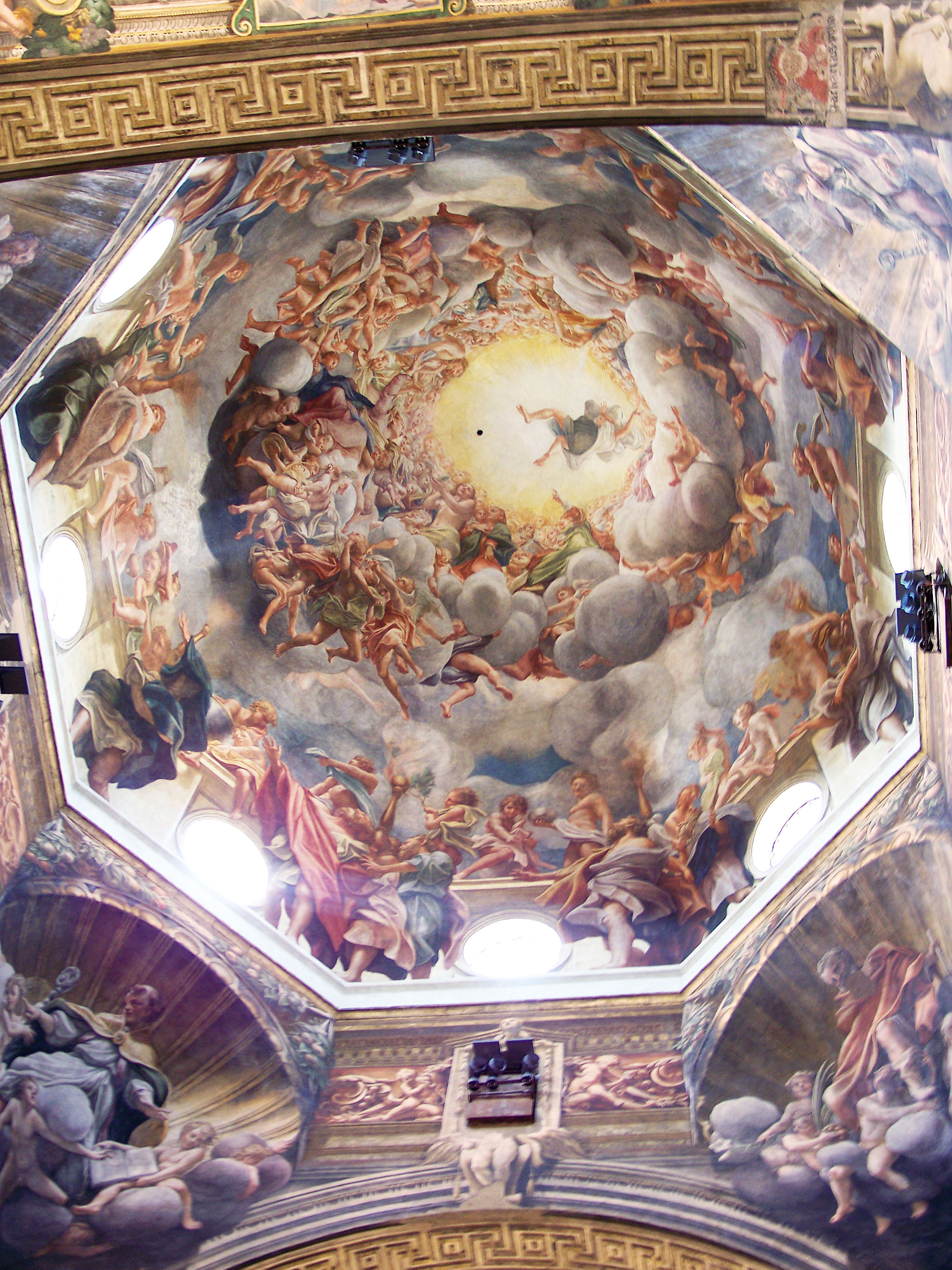
- Artist: Antonio da Correggio
- Year: 1526–1530
- Type: Fresco
- Dimensions: 1093 cm × 1195 cm (430 in × 470 in)
- Location: Parma Cathedral

- Paris Bordone – The Rest on the Flight into Egypt (approximate date)
- Bronzino – Portrait of Andrea Doria as Neptune (approximate date)
- Antonio da Correggio
  - Assumption of the Virgin (fresco on dome of Parma Cathedral completed)
  - Nativity (placed in church of St. Prosper of Reggio Emilia; now in Gemäldegalerie Alte Meister, Dresden)
- Lucas Cranach the Elder – The Judgement of Paris (approximate date)
- Il Garofalo – Madonna and Child and St Jerome
- Quentin Matsys – Ill-Matched Marriage (approximate completion date)
- Parmigianino – Portrait of a Man Reading a Book (approximate date; York Art Gallery, England)
- Titian – The Madonna of the Rabbit (approximate date)
- Portrait of Francis I of France (approximate date)

== Births ==
- Giovanni Battista Armenini, Italian art historian and critic (died 1609)
- Nicolás Borrás, Spanish painter (died 1610)
- Barthel Bruyn the Younger, German portraitist, son of Barthel Bruyn the Elder (died 1607-1610)
- Francesco Camilliani, Italian sculptor of the Renaissance period (died 1586)
- Cesare da Bagno, Italian sculptor and medallist (died 1564)
- Giovanni Battista Fiammeri, Florentine Jesuit painter (died 1606)
- Lattanzio Gambara, Italian painter, active in Renaissance and Mannerist styles (died 1574)
- Aurelio Luini, Italian painter from Milan (died 1592)
- Simon Pereyns, Flemish painter who worked in Portugal, Spain, and Mexico (died 1600)
- Lorenzo Sabbatini, Italian painter of the Renaissance (died 1577)
- Adamo Scultori, Italian engraver (died 1585)
- Ercole Setti, Italian engraver (died 1618)
- Hendrick van den Broeck, Flemish painter active mainly in Rome (died 1597)
- Cesare Vecellio, Italian engraver and painter (died 1601)
- Ottavio Semini, Italian painter born and trained in Genoa (died 1604)
- (born c.1530-1): Johan Gregor van der Schardt, Dutch-born sculptor (died c.1591)
- (born 1530–1535): Niccolò Circignani, Italian painter of the late-Renaissance or Mannerist period (died 1590)

== Deaths ==
- February 24 – Properzia de' Rossi, Italian female Renaissance sculptor (born c. 1490)
- April 28 – Niklaus Manuel, Swiss dramaturg, painter, graphic artist and politician (born 1484)
- date unknown
  - Marco Basaiti, Venetian Greek painter and a rival of Giovanni Bellini (born 1470)
  - Quentin Matsys, Flemish painter (born 1466)
  - Bartolomeo Suardi, Italian painter and architect (born 1456)
  - Domenico Panetti, Italian painter of the Renaissance period, active mainly in Ferrara (born 1460)
  - Kanō Masanobu, chief painter of the Ashikaga shogunate, founder of the Kanō school of painting (born 1434)
  - Andrea Sabbatini, Italian painter of the Renaissance (born 1487)
