= Avarice (disambiguation) =

Avarice is another word for "greed", an insatiable desire for material gain.

Avarice may also refer to:

- Avarice (Dürer, Vienna), a 1507 painting by Albrecht Dürer
- Operation Avarice, a U.S. military operation
- "Avarice", a song by Disturbed from Ten Thousand Fists

== See also ==
- Avaris, a place in ancient Egypt
- Averis, a surname
