= 1585 in art =

Events from the year 1585 in art.

== Events ==
- March 3 – The Teatro Olimpico, Vicenza, designed by Palladio and completed by Vincenzo Scamozzi, is opened, with trompe-l'œil scenery in one-point perspective.
- The Eclectic Academy of painting, also called the Accademia degli Incamminati, is founded in Bologna by Ludovico Carracci and others.
- French cardinal Matthieu Cointrel (Contarelli in Italian) dies, leaving an endowment and instructions for the decoration of the Contarelli Chapel in Rome.
- Persian miniature painter Farrukh Beg moves to the court of Mughal emperor Akbar in India and receives his title.
- Approximate date – Start of Flemish Baroque painting.

== Works ==
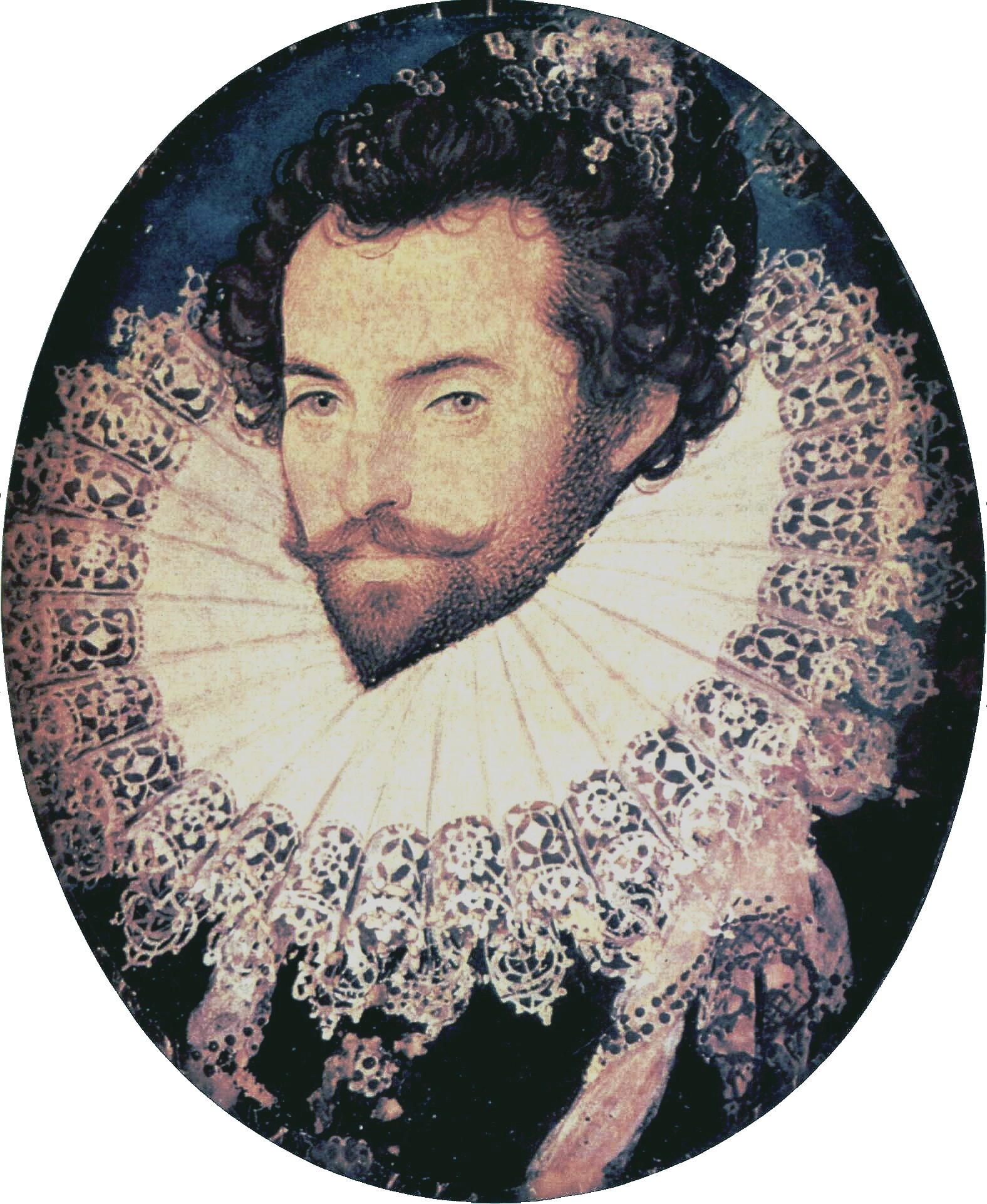
Hilliard - Portrait miniature of Walter Ralegh

- Pietro Francavilla – Saturn Devouring one of his Sons (sculpture)
- El Greco
  - St. Dominic in Prayer
  - The Virgin of the Immaculate Conception and St. John
  - Saint Francis Receiving the Stigmata
- Nicholas Hilliard - Portrait miniature of Sir Walter Ralegh
- Taddeo Landini - Statue of Pope Sixtus V (now destroyed)
- Paolo Veronese - Lucretia
- John White – Indian Village of Secoton
  - The Ermine Portrait

== Births ==
- January - Hendrick Avercamp, Dutch painter (died 1634)
- May 17 (bapt.) - Esaias van de Velde, Dutch landscape painter (died 1630)
- June 28 - Sisto Badalocchio, Italian painter and engraver of the Bolognese School (died 1647)
- July 7 - Thomas Howard, 21st Earl of Arundel, English art collector (died 1646)
- August 25 - Giovanni Biliverti, Italian Mannerist painter (died 1644)
- date unknown
  - Arent Arentsz, Dutch painter (died 1631)
  - Sir Nathaniel Bacon, English landowner and painter of kitchen and market scenes with large vegetables, fruit, and buxom maids (died 1627)
  - Boetius à Bolswert, Dutch engraver (died 1633)
  - Isaac Briot, French engraver and draughtsman (died 1670)
  - Angelo Caroselli, Italian painter of the Baroque period (died 1652)
  - Huang Daozhou, Chinese calligrapher, scholar and official of the Ming Dynasty (died 1646)
  - Lan Ying, Chinese painter of landscapes, human figures, flowers and birds during the Ming Dynasty (died 1664)
  - John Taylor, English portrait painter (died 1651)
  - Jacob van Geel, Dutch Golden Age painter (died 1648)
  - Ottavio Vannini, Italian painter of altarpieces and churches, active mainly in Florence (died 1643)
  - Giuseppe Vermiglio, Caravaggisti painter from Northern Italy (died 1635)
  - Wen Zhenheng, Chinese Ming dynasty scholar, painter, and landscape garden designer (died 1645)

== Deaths ==
- September 6 - Luca Cambiasi, Italian painter (born 1527)
- December 19 - Wenzel Jamnitzer, Northern Mannerist goldsmith, artist, and printmaker in etching (born 1507/1508)
- date unknown
  - Giuseppe Marullo, Italian painter (date of birth unknown)
  - Adamo Scultori, Italian engraver (born 1530)
  - Francisco de Holanda, Portuguese humanist and painter (born 1517)
- probable - Jacob de Backer, Flemish Mannerist painter and draughtsman (born 1555)
