= Cristóbal Ramírez =

Cristóbal Ramírez may refer to:

- Cristóbal Ramírez de Cartagena, 16th-century Spanish colonial governor of Peru
- Cristóbal Ramírez (painter) (active 1566, died 1577), Spanish painter
