= Villoldo (surname) =

Villoldo is a surname. Notable people with the surname include:

- Ángel Villoldo (1861–1919), Argentine musician
- Juan de Villoldo (died 1551), Spanish painter
- Tomás Villoldo (born 1995), Argentine footballer
