= 1688 in art =

Events from the year 1688 in art.

== Events ==
- Matthias Steinl becomes ivory engraver at the imperial court in Vienna.
- The Equestrian statue of Christian V by French sculptor Abraham-César Lamoureux is unveiled on Kongens Nytorv, Copenhagen.

== Paintings ==
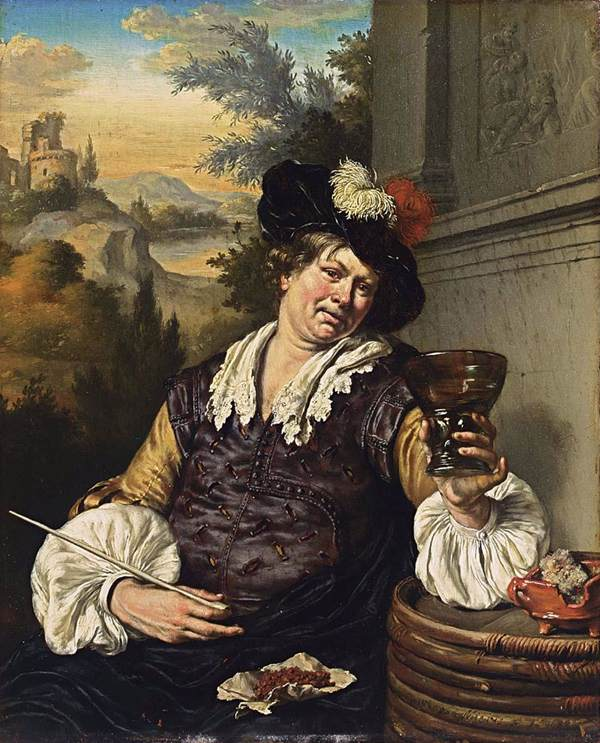
van Mieris – A Seated Man, private collection

- René-Antoine Houasse – Minerva teaching the Rhodians sculpture (Palace of Versailles)
- Willem van de Velde the Younger – The Fleet at Sea
- Willem van Mieris – A Seated Man

== Births ==
- March 16 – Anna Maria Garthwaite, English textile designer (died 1763)
- April 15 – Johann Georg Bergmüller, Bavarian painter of frescoes, of the Baroque (died 1762)
- April 28 – Giacomo Boni, Italian painter of the late-Baroque period (died 1766)
- May 6 – Charles Parrocel, French painter and engraver and a specialist in battle and hunt paintings (died 1752)
- July 19 – Giuseppe Castiglione, Italian Jesuit Brother, missionary in China, painter at the imperial court (died 1766)
- September 6 – Antonio Corradini, Venetian Rococo sculptor (died 1752)
- September 12 – Ferdinand Brokoff, Bohemian sculptor (died 1731)
- October 29 – Amalia Pachelbel, German painter and engraver (died 1723)
- November 21 – Antonio Visentini, Italian designer, painter and engraver (died 1782)
- date unknown
  - Charles-Nicolas Cochin the Elder, French line-engraver (died 1754)
  - François Dumont, French sculptor (died 1726)
  - Gerolamo Mengozzi Colonna, Italian quadratura painter (died 1774)
  - José de Ibarra, Mexican painter (died 1756)
  - Ercole Graziani the Younger, Italian painter (died 1765)
  - Edme Jeaurat, French engraver (died 1738)
  - Louis August le Clerc, French-born sculptor (died 1771)
  - François Lemoyne, French Rococo painter (died 1737)
  - Francesco Maria Schiaffino, Italian sculptor (died 1763)
  - Gao Xiang, Qing Chinese painter, and one of the Eight Eccentrics of Yangzhou (died 1753)

== Deaths ==
- February 11 – Cesare Gennari, Italian painter (born 1641)
- March 9 – Claude Mellan, French engraver and painter (born 1598)
- April 3 – Cosimo Fancelli, Italian sculptor (born 1620)
- October 4 – Philips Koninck, Dutch landscape painter (born 1619)
- October 13 – Pedro de Mena, Spanish sculptor (born 1628)
- October 14 – Joachim von Sandrart, German art-historian and painter (born 1606)
- December 8 – Thomas Flatman, English poet and miniature painter (born 1635)
- date unknown
  - Giovanni Battista Benaschi, Italian painter and engraver active in the late-Renaissance period (born 1636)
  - Pedro Atanasio Bocanegra, Spanish painter (born 1638)
  - Carlo Cane, Italian painter (born 1618)
