= Averis =

Averis is a surname.

== List of people with the surname ==
- James Averis (born 1974), English cricketer
- John Averis, a British firefighter who died in 2007 fighting the 2007 Warwickshire warehouse fire

== See also ==
- Avarice (disambiguation)
