= Luis de Carvajal (painter) =

Spanish painter

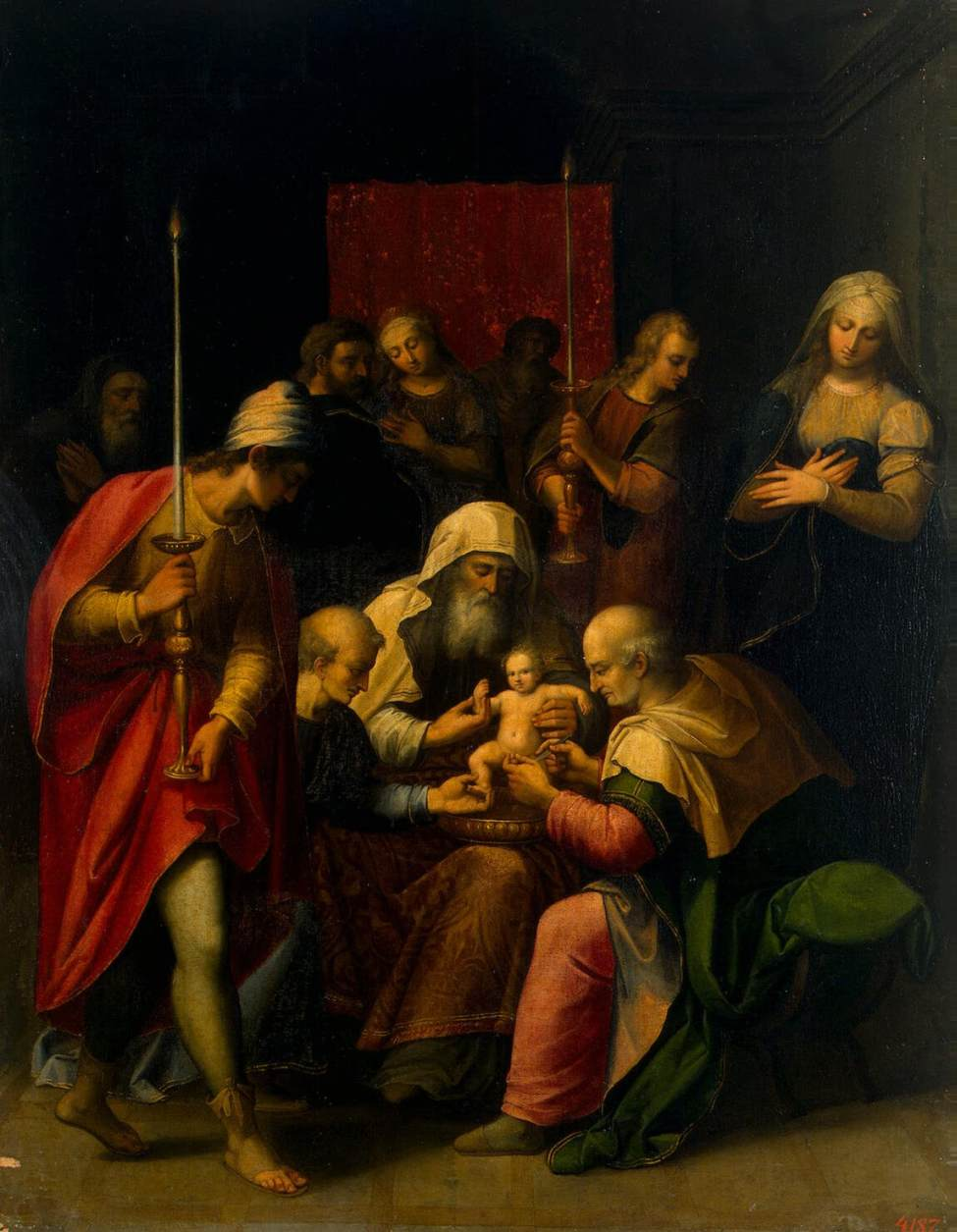
Circumcision by Luis de Carbajal, Hermitage Museum, 1580s

Luis de Carvajal (1531 – died after 1618) was a Spanish painter of the Renaissance period.

== Biography ==
Born in Toledo, he was the brother of the sculptor and architect Juan Bautista Monegro, and pupil of Juan de Villoldo. At the age of 21 years, he was working with his master in the Archbishop's chapel in Toledo.

He was then named painter for King Philip II of Spain. He painted some lesser works for the monastery in the Escorial. In 1570, for the church of the Escorial, he painted seven large canvases pairing the following saints: Cosme and Damián; Sixto and Elias; Cecilia and Barbara; Bonaventure and Thomas of Aquinus; John Chrisostom and Gregory Nazarene; Ambrosius and Nicolas of Bari; Leander and Isidore. He also decorated two oratories in the cloister of the Evangelists in which he represented the Baptism of Christ, the Adoration of the Magi, the Announcement to Shepherds, the Cirucumcision, and Wedding at Cannae. In 1591 Carbajal painted in Toledo, along with Blas del Prado, in the convent of the Minims, and worked with other painters in the Pardo Palace, as well as in 1615 in the chapter hall of the cathedral of Toledo. Among his works there include a portrait of the Archbishop Bartolomé Carranza.

Some of these works are now at the Museo del Prado in Madrid.
