= 1577 in art =

Events from the year 1577 in art.

== Events ==
- El Greco moves from Rome to Spain, where he will spend the rest of his life.
- The Accademia di San Luca is founded as an association of artists in Rome.

== Works ==
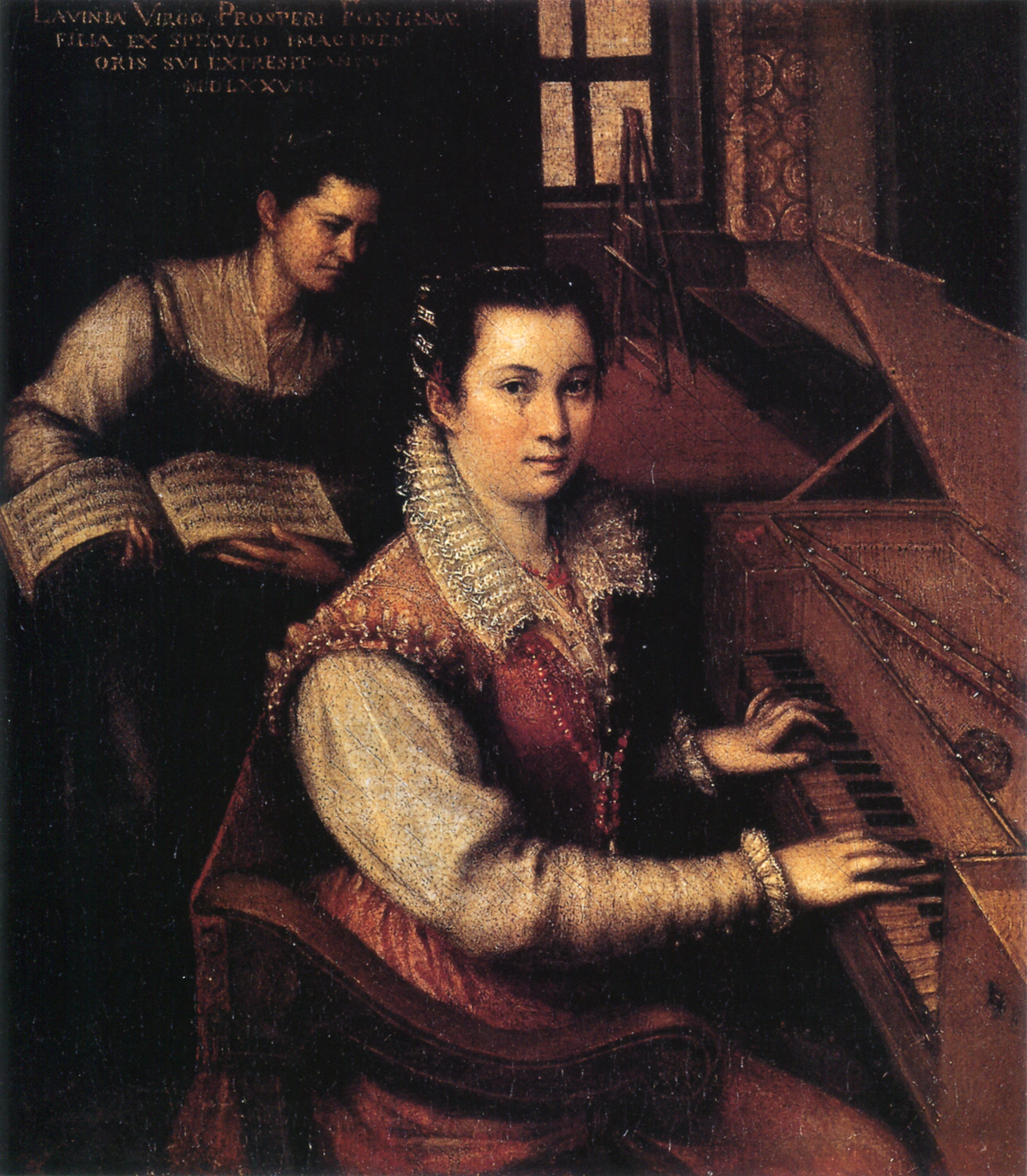
Lavinia Fontana - Self-Portrait at the Clavichord

Some dates approximate

- Lavinia Fontana - Self-Portrait at the Clavichord Accompanied by a Handmaiden
- El Greco - The Repentant Magdalen
- Nicholas Hilliard - Portrait miniatures
  - The Duke of Alençon
  - Marguerite of Navarre
  - Self-portrait
- Cornelis Ketel - Martin Frobisher

== Births ==
- March 20 - Alessandro Tiarini, Italian Baroque painter of frescoes, façade decorations, and altarpieces (died 1668)
- June 28 – Peter Paul Rubens, Flemish painter (died 1640)
- July 21 - Adam Willaerts, Dutch painter (died 1664)
- October 17 - Cristofano Allori, Italian painter (died 1621)
- December 8 - Mario Minniti, Italian painter, also the model for Caravaggio's painting Boy with a Basket of Fruit (died 1640)
- date unknown
  - Eugenio Caxés, Spanish painter (died 1634)
  - Giacomo Cavedone, Italian painter of the Bolognese School (died 1660)
  - Giovanni Battista Crescenzi, Italian painter and architect (died 1635)
  - Aart Jansz Druyvesteyn, Dutch Golden Age painter (died 1627)
  - Cornelis van der Geest, Dutch merchant and art collector (died 1638)

== Deaths ==
- February 17 - Giuliano Bugiardini, Italian painter (born 1475)
- May - Richard Aertsz, Dutch historical painter (born 1482)
- June 12 - Orazio Samacchini, Italian Mannerist painter (born 1532)
- date unknown
  - Juan de Juni, French–Spanish sculptor (born 1507)
  - Léonard Limousin, French painter, member of Limoges enamel painter family (born 1505)
  - Guglielmo della Porta, Italian architect and sculptor (born c.1500)
  - Antonis Mor, Dutch portrait painter (born 1517)
  - Cristóbal Ramírez, painter and illuminator of manuscripts for King Philip II of Spain
  - Lorenzo Sabbatini, Italian painter (born 1530)
  - Michele Tosini, Italian Mannerist painter (born 1503)
- probable - Gert van Groningen, Danish sculptor (date of birth unknown)
