= The Libyan Sibyl (Guercino) =

1651 painting by Guercino

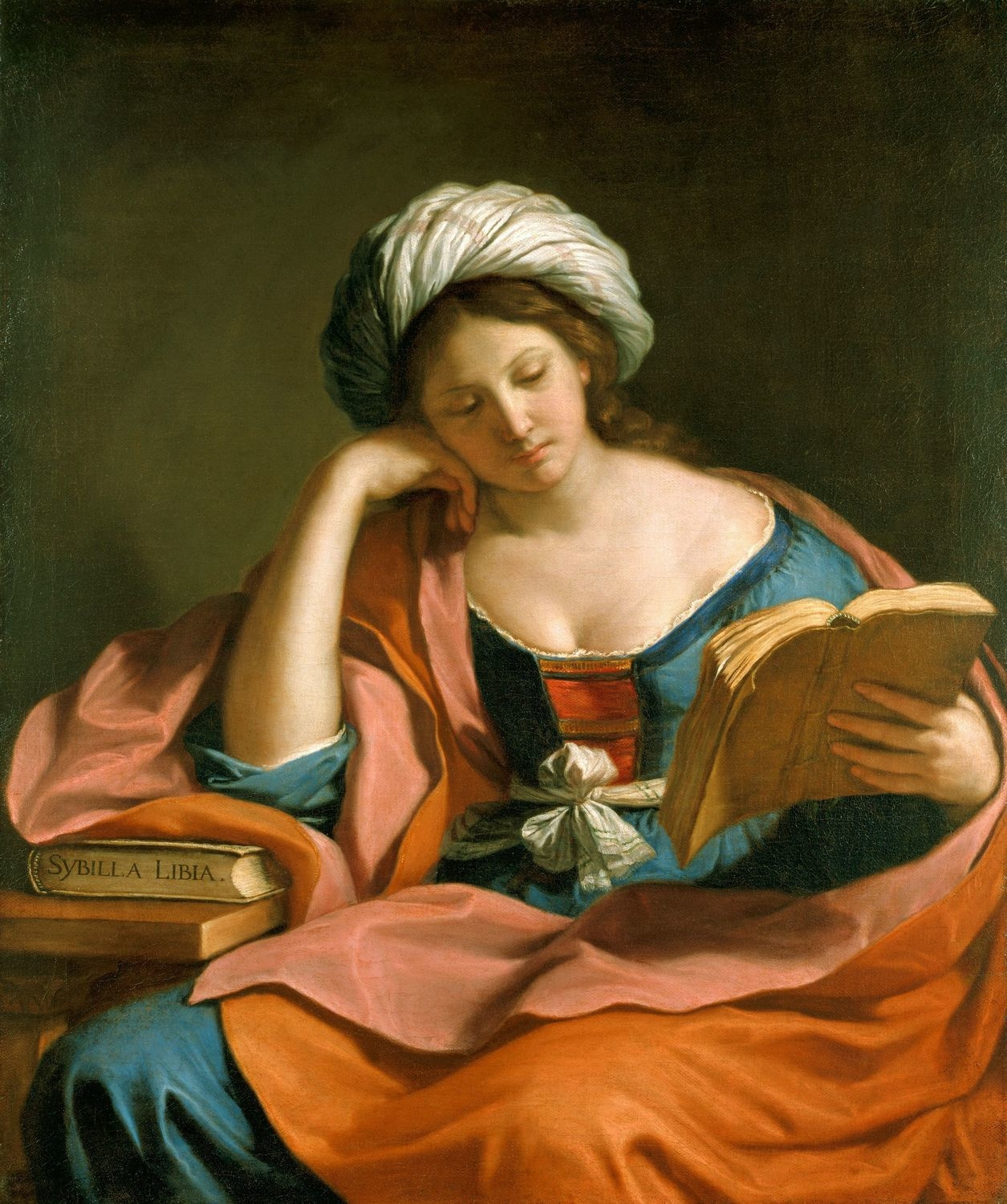
- Year: 1651
- Medium: oil paint, canvas
- Dimensions: 116.3 cm (45.8 in) × 96.5 cm (38.0 in)
- Location: Buckingham Palace, Holyrood Palace
- Accession: RCIN 405340

The Libyan Sibyl is a 1651 oil on canvas painting by Guercino. It is now in the Royal Collection, in which it was first recorded in 1790, though it had probably been purchased in Italy by Richard Dalton for George III in the early 1760s.

== History ==
It and The Samian Sibyl (private collection) were produced as a pair for 120 ducatoni for Ippolito Cattani (or Cattanio) of Bologna, with payment made on 4 December 1651. A studio replica of the latter re-emerged into the written record in 1777, when it was bought by Leopold, Grand Duke of Tuscany.
