= Saint Francis Receiving the Stigmata (El Greco, Baltimore) =

Painting by El Greco

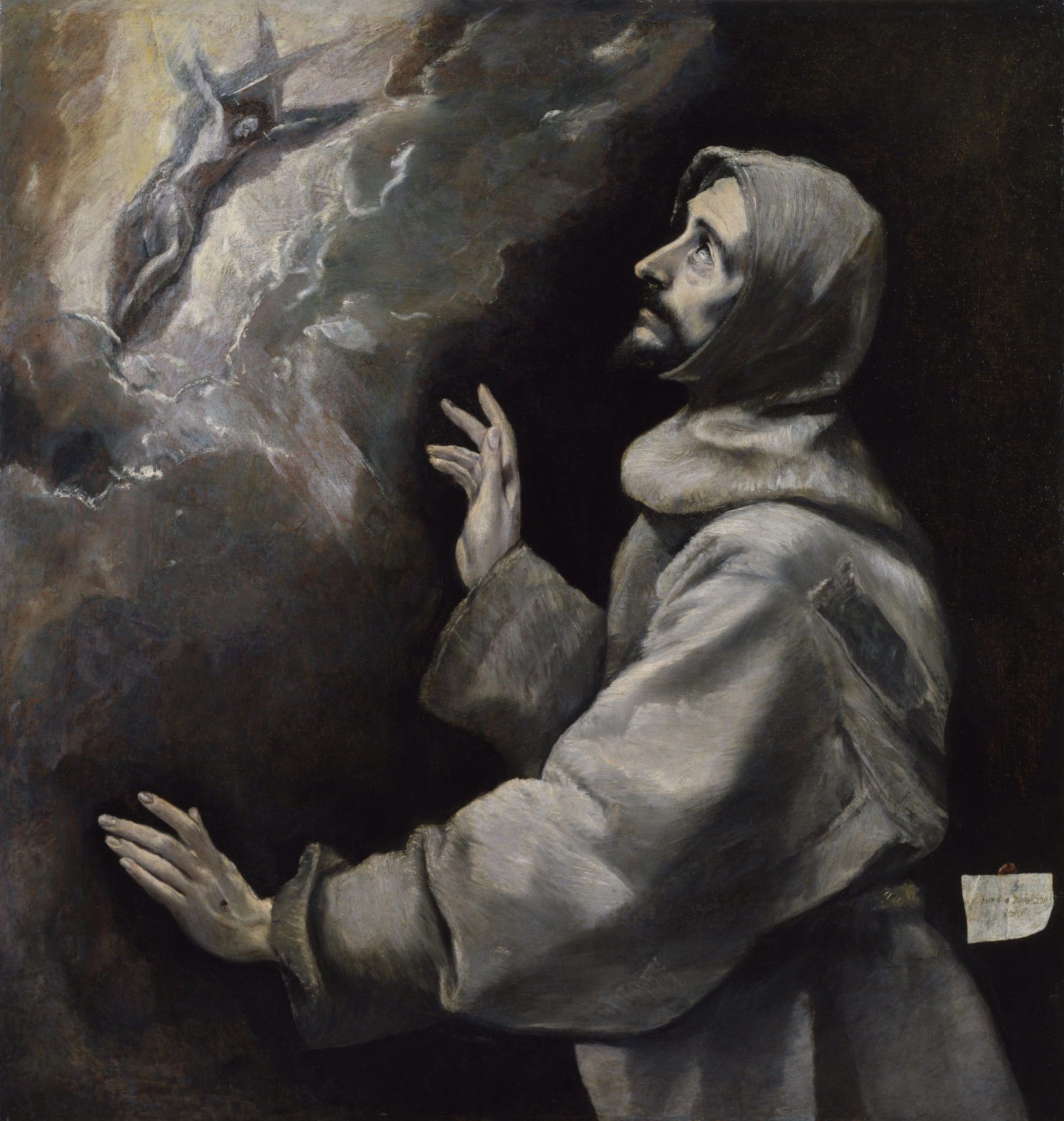

Saint Francis Receiving the Stigmata is a c.1585 oil on canvas painting by El Greco, now in the Walters Art Museum in Baltimore. It shows Francis of Assisi receiving the stigmata.

Simultaneously he painted a second version (now in the Escorial). Both are signed, though the second has been cut down and so its signature is incomplete.

== Bibliography ==
- Gudiol, José (1983). The Complete Paintings of El Greco. New York: Greenwich House. ISBN 0-517-40499-0.
