= Juan Bautista Bayuco =

Spanish painter

Juan Bautista Bayuco was a painter of some repute at Valencia, where he was born in 1664. His best works were his pictures in the cloister of the convent of St. Sebastian, illustrative of the 'Life of San Francisco de Paula'.
