= Jakob Woller =

German sculptor (1510–1564)

Jakob Woller (1510 – 1564 in Tübingen) was a German sculptor. In 1556, he came to Tübingen, to work at the St. George's Collegiate Church, Tübingen.
