= Antonio David (painter) =

Italian painter

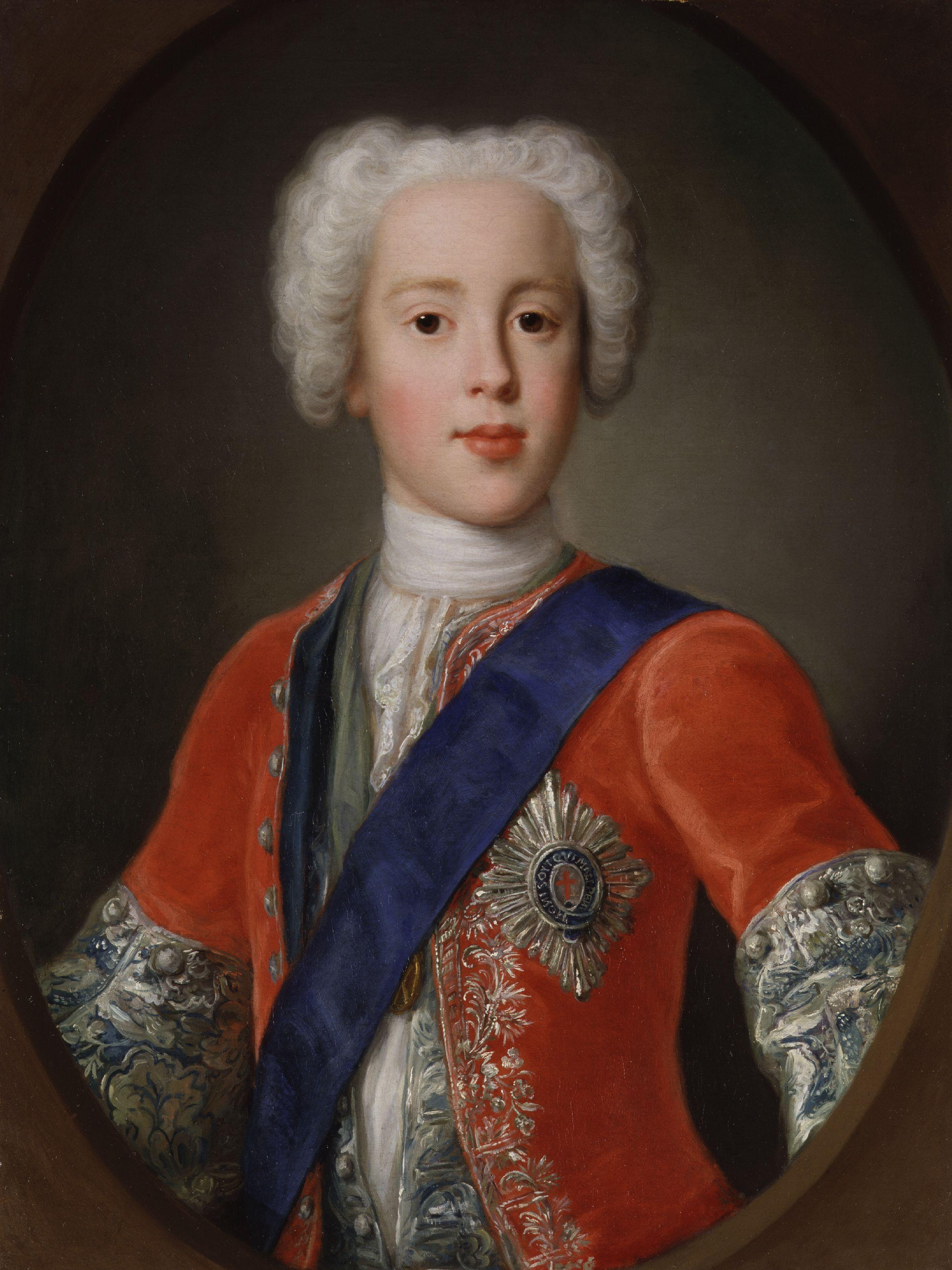
Antonio David, Prince Charles Edward Stuart, National Portrait Gallery

Antonio David (1698–1750) was an Italian painter. He was the son of Lodovico Antonio David (1648-1730), a portrait artist and painter of religious scene.

David was the official painter for the exiled Jacobite court living in Rome. He was appointed Painter to his Majesty James Francis Edward Stuart in 1718.

David painted primarily portraits, and for twenty years worked almost exclusively with the House of Stuart. In 1729, he was paid in advance for official portraits of Prince Charles Edward Stuart and his brother, Prince Henry.

He died in 1750.

== Notable works ==
- The Chapel Royal: The Baptism of Prince Charles 31 December 1720 in the Scottish National Portrait Gallery
- Cardinal Filippo Antonio Gualterio 1720 (private collection)
- James III, 1722 (private collection)
- Marjory Hay, Countess of Inverness, as Diana, 1723 in the collection of the Earl of Mansfield, Scone Palace
- Queen Clementina, 1725 in the Pininski Foundation, Warsasw.
- Portraits of Prince Charles Edward Stuart and Prince Henry Stuart, 1729.
