= The Union of Earth and Water =

Painting by Peter Paul Rubens

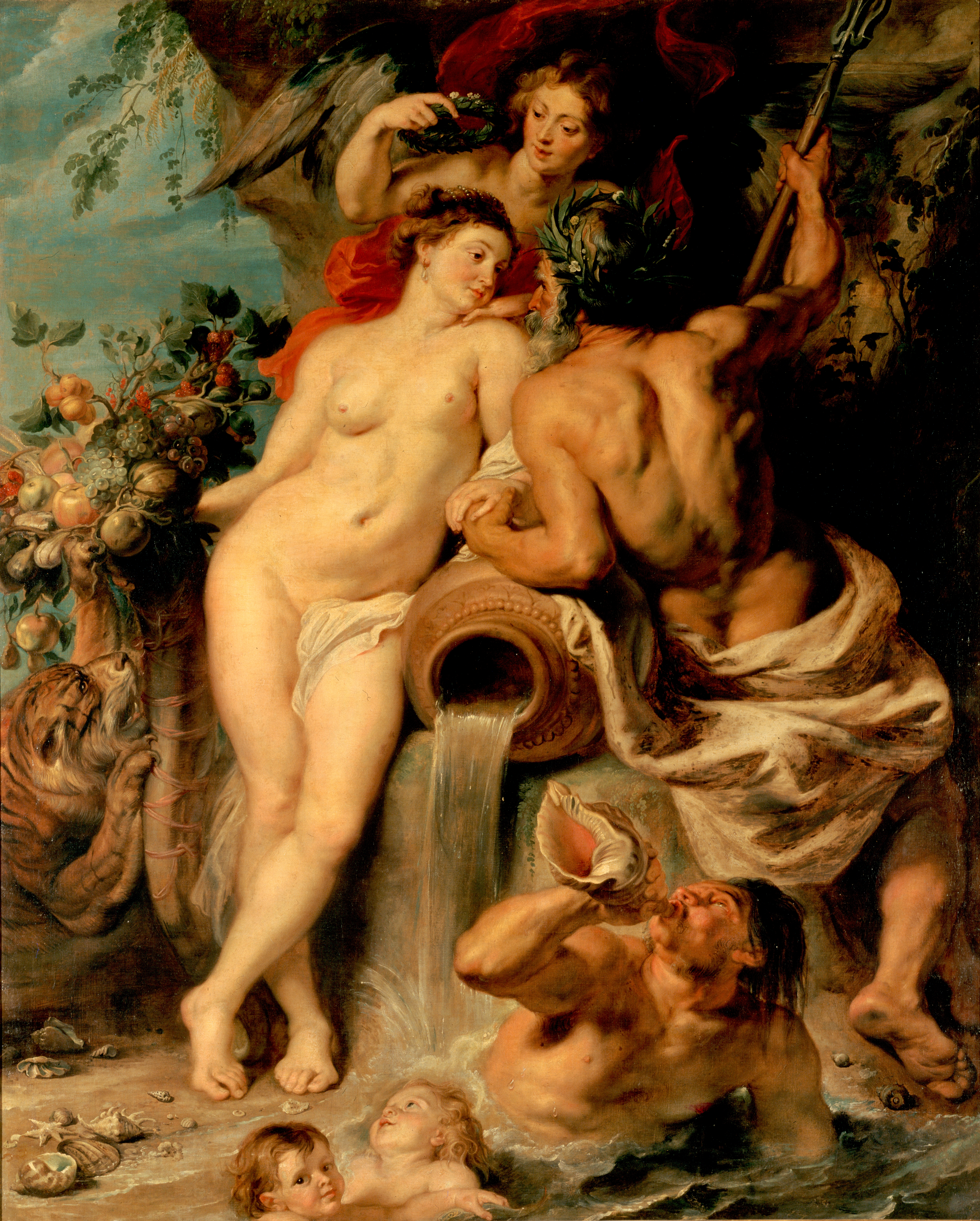
- Artist: Peter Paul Rubens
- Year: c. 1618
- Medium: Oil on canvas
- Dimensions: 222.5 cm × 180.5 cm (87.6 in × 71.1 in)
- Location: Hermitage Museum; Saint Petersburg

The Union of Earth and Water is a Baroque painting by Flemish artist Peter Paul Rubens, showing Cybele as the personification of earth holding the horn of plenty and [the River God Scheldt] as the personification of water in the center. The pair is crowned by the goddess Victoria and the union is heralded through a conch by the Triton below. The union symbolizes fertility, wealth and prosperity, specifically the city of Antwerp and the river Scheldt whose mouth in Rubens' times was blocked by the Dutch depriving Flanders of the access to the sea. The painting features a pyramidal composition, symmetry and the balance of forms. It was influenced by late Italian Renaissance, particularly by Venetian artists.

A smaller copy of the painting made in the Rubens' workshop was owned by the Russian businessman Vladimir Logvinenko. Following the abolition of a thirty per cent import duty on artworks in 2004, Logvinenko brought the copy from London to Moscow.

== Provenance ==
The painting is housed in the Rubens Hall of the Hermitage Museum, in Saint Petersburg. Previously it had been in the Chigi Collection in Rome from which it was acquired by the Hermitage Museum between 1798 and 1800.

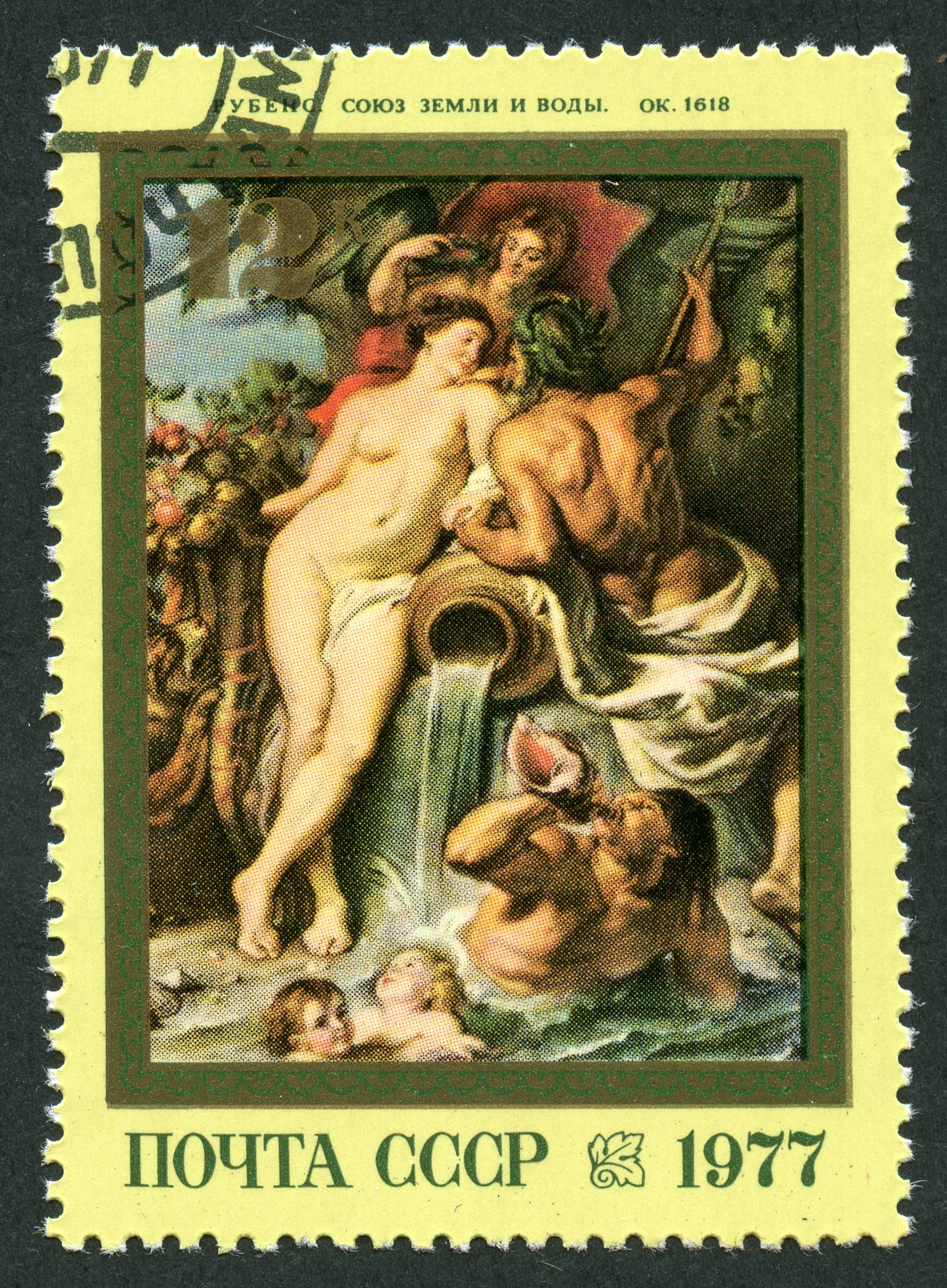
The Union of Earth and Water on a Soviet postage stamp, 1977
