= Guglielmo da Leoni =

Italian painter

Guglielmo da Leoni (1664 – c. 1740) was an Italian painter and engraver. He was born at Parma. He was reputedly a pupil of Giulio Romano, but he soon abandoned painting for engraving.
