= Carlo Cane =

Italian painter (1618–1688)

Carlo Cane (1618–1688) was an Italian painter of the Baroque period.

He was born at Gallarate, Province of Varese. He was instructed by Melchiore Gilardini. He copied the works of Morazzone with success, and became a historical painter, particularly in fresco. He painted in fresco a St. Ambrose and St. Hugo in the Certosa at Padua. He also painted landscapes and animals. He died at Milan. There is a second Carlo Cane of Trino, described by Irico in his History of Trino as having painted in 1600 two altar-pieces for the Benedictine abbey of Locedia.
