= Cesare da Bagno =

Italian sculptor (1530–1564)

Cesare da Bagno (1530–1564), also known as Cesare di Niccolo di Mariano Federighi, was an Italian sculptor and medallist.

As his nickname implies, Cesare was born in Santa Maria al Bagno. Most of what is known about da Bagno is based on his surviving works. He produced a statue of Alfonso d'Avalos, Marquess of Vasto which now resides at the National Gallery of Art. He also produced a medal featuring Cosimo I de' Medici, Grand Duke of Tuscany. He died in Milan in 1564.
