= Avarice (Dürer, Vienna) =

1507 painting by Albrecht Dürer

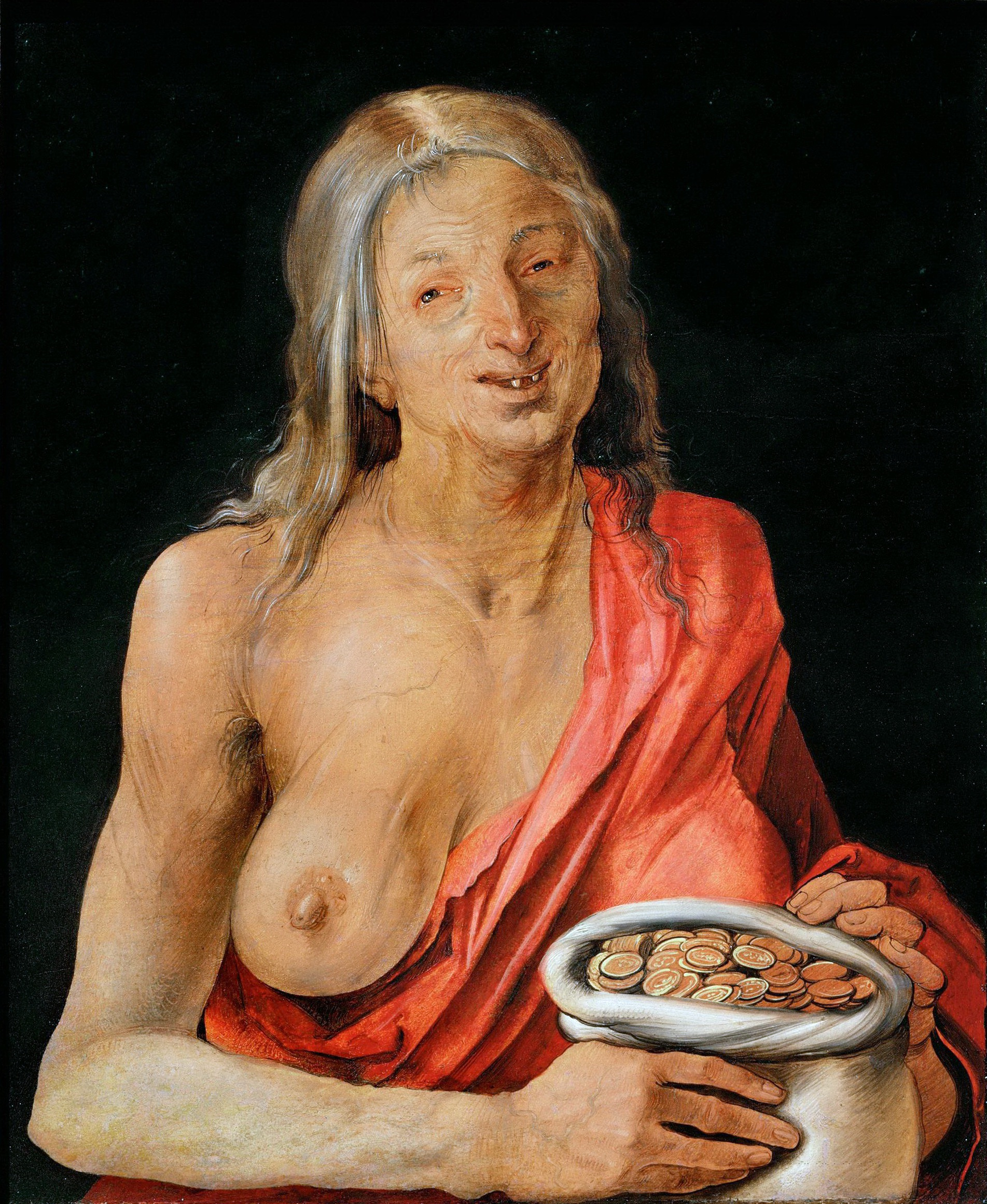
Avarice, 1507, Kunsthistorisches Museum, Vienna. 35cm × 29 cm

Avarice (German: Allegorie des Geizes) is a small (35 × 29 cm) oil-on-limewood painting of 1507 by Albrecht Dürer (1471–1528). The work is found on the reverse of his Portrait of Young Man; it has been speculated, though it is impossible to know, that they were intended to form part of a diptych. Avarice is allegorical and serves as a warning at both the transience of life and the ultimate worthlessness of earthly fortune. It is generally grouped, along with Melencolia I, as one of Dürer's vanitas images.

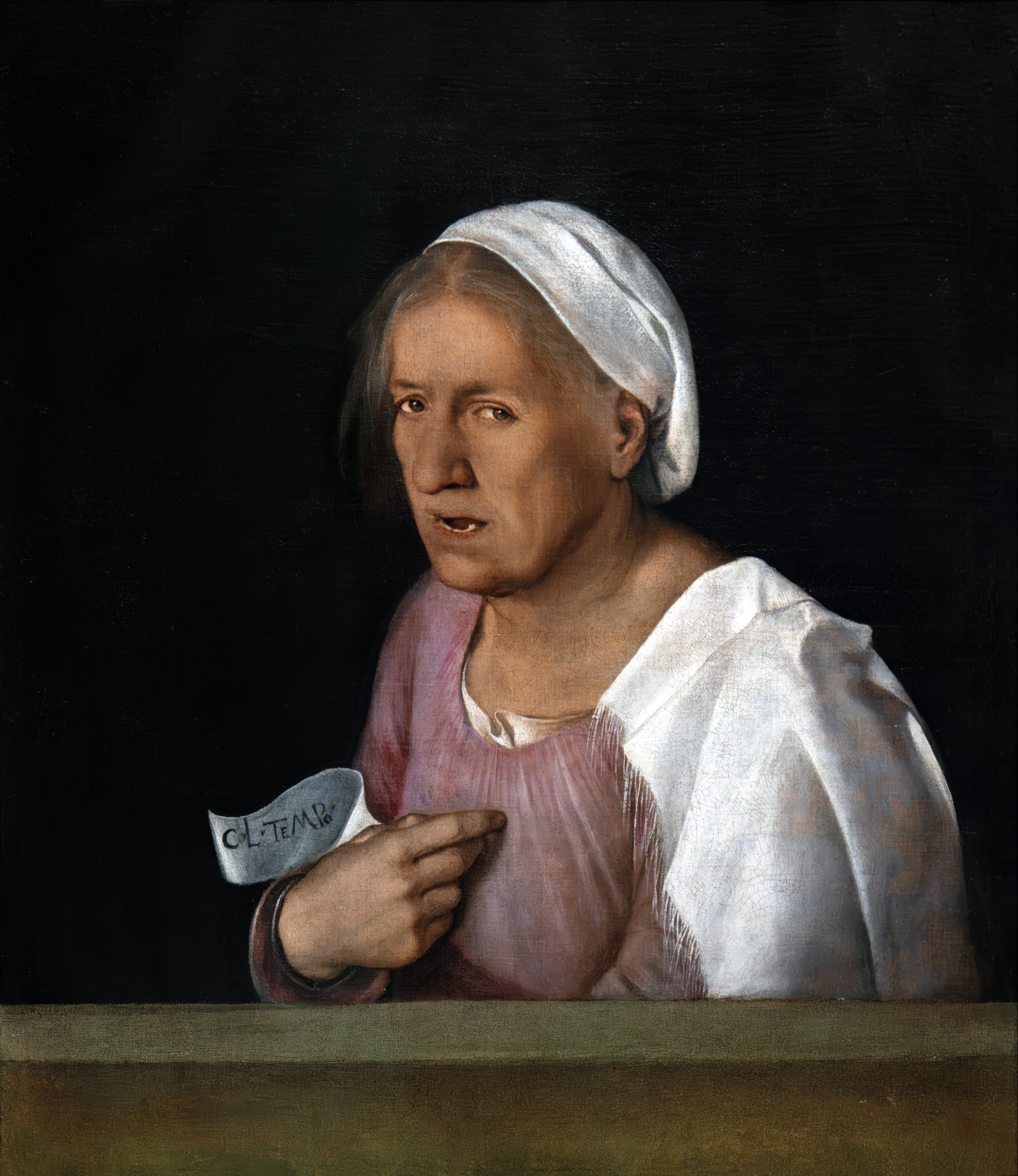
Giorgione's Col tempo ('With age'), 1500–1510, shares the depiction of loose strands of hair, sagging breasts and an ambiguous facial expression with Dürer's 1507 morality painting.

Intended to represent both avarice and the passing nature of youthful beauty, the woman is shown in half-length, painted in thick impasto. She has long and straight blond hair, glazed eyes, a long nose, a pinched jaw and a mouth with only two remaining teeth, which is twisted in a scornful laugh. Her visible right arm is muscular and out of proportion to the rest of her body, while a dark tuft of hair sprouts from her underarm. Only her hair and the regular and almost noble outlines of her face hint at former beauty. The intense focus of the image is achieved by tight cropping and the contrast between the lush colouring of the woman's gown and hair against the flat black background.

Art historians have compared the work to a Giorgionesque canvas Col tempo (With age), with which it shares obvious thematic similarities, while Dürer's use of impasto and the rich colouring in the foreground display a debt to the Venetian school. The art historian T. Sturge Moore suggests that Dürer may have wanted to show that he could paint like Giorgione. Others believe that the work is a satire on a sitter who had not paid him as much as he might have wished for an earlier portrait. However, given the artist's financial situation at this time, it seems unlikely that he would have deliberately offended potential patrons or customers. Writer Jessie Allen discounts this theory and believes that the work was likely unable to attract a buyer and to save money, Dürer used the other side of the canvas to create a commercially viable image. The work is often seen as unfinished and is sometimes referred to as a sketch.

Avarice is held in the Kunsthistorisches Museum, Vienna. It is in good condition, and the colours retain their vibrancy.

It is titled "Allegorische Frauenfigur/Allegorical Female Figure" by the Kunsthistoriches.

== Sources ==
- Allen, Jessie. Albert Dürer. Kessinger, 2005. ISBN 0-7661-9475-2
- Bailey, Martin. Dürer. London: Phidon Press, 1995. ISBN 0-7148-3334-7
- Silver, Larry & Smith, Jeffrey Chipps. The Essential Dürer. University of Pennsylvania Press, 2010. ISBN 0-8122-4187-8
- Sturge Moore, T. Albert Dürer. Bastian Books, 2008. ISBN 0-554-23107-7
- Thausing, Moriz. Albert Dürer: His Life and Work, Part 1. Kessinger Publishing, 2003. ISBN 0-7661-5416-5
