= Rolando Marchelli =

Italian painter

Rolando Marchelli (born 1664, date of death unknown) was an Italian painter of the Baroque period, active mainly in his natal city of Genoa.
