= Cristóbal Ramírez (painter) =

Spanish painter

Cristóbal Ramírez (died 1577) was a Spanish painter and illuminator of manuscripts for King Philip II of Spain. He was a native of Valencia, and did most of his work in his native city; he is known to have been active in 1566. He returned to el Escorial and died there, leaving his daughter and two sons under the king's protection. Among the books illuminated by this artist were the Oficio di difuntos, the Intonario, and the Brevario Nuevo en Cantoria for the Escorial.

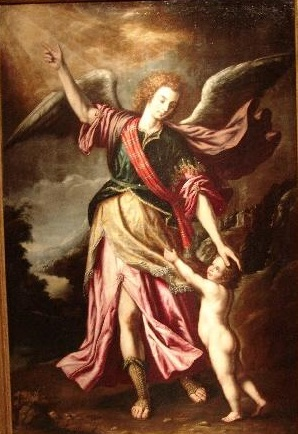
"El ángel de la guarda", 170 x 112 cm, Museo de Santa Cruz, Toledo, 1638
