= Juan de Villoldo =

Spanish painter

Juan de Villoldo (died 1551) was a Spanish painter from Toledo. He was apprenticed to his uncle, Alonzo Perez de Villoldo, a student of Juan de Borgoña. From 1547 to 1548, he painted a series of religious canvases for the Carbajal chapel in the Church of St. Andrew at Madrid.

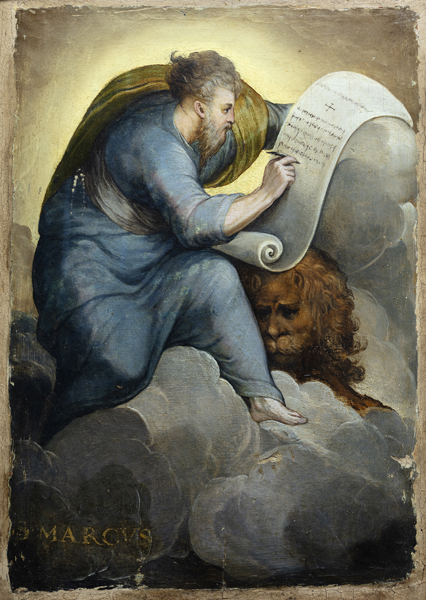
Saint Mark
(Palencia Cathedral)

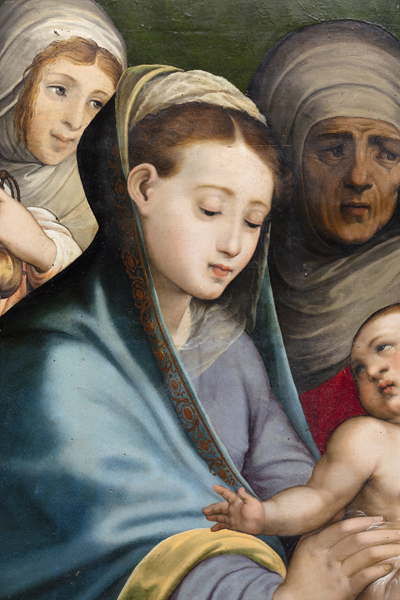
Presentation of the Child (Palencia)

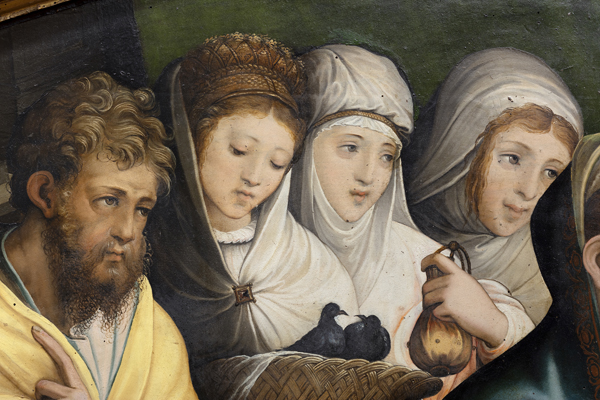
Presentation of the Child (Palencia)

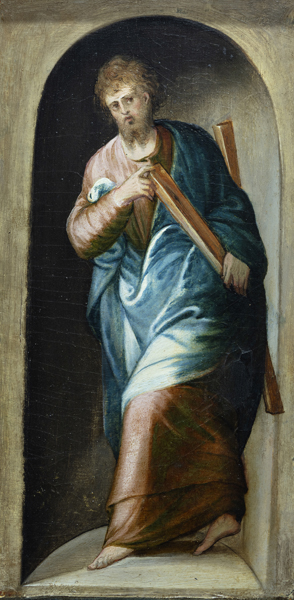
Saint Andrew (Palencia)

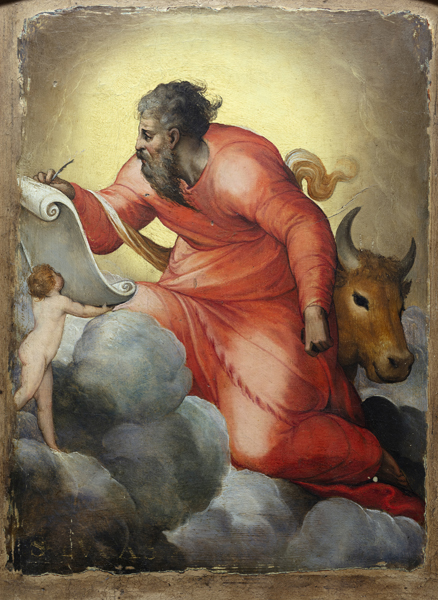
Saint Luke (Palencia)
