= Girolamo Comi =

Italian Renaissance painter

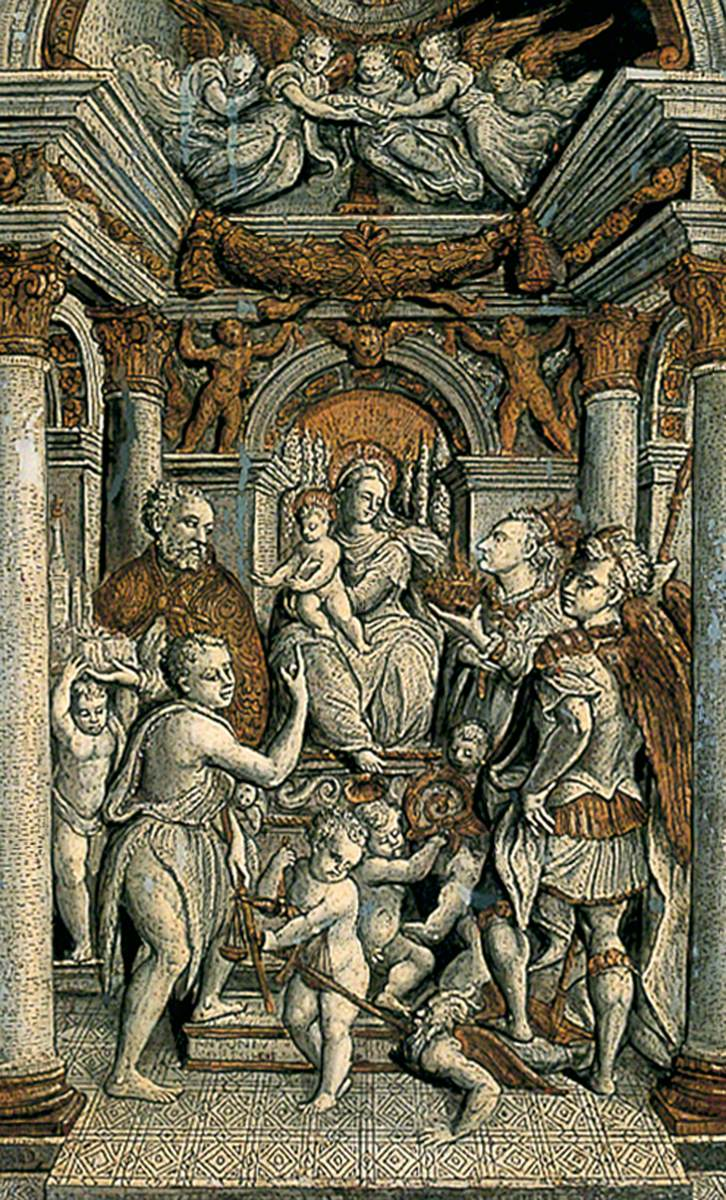
The Madonna with St George

Girolamo Comi (1507–1581) was a 16th-century Italian Renaissance painter.

Not much is known about Girolamo Comi's life except through his works. He primarily painted religious-themed paintings for church commissions. One work executed by Comi The Madonna with St George is part of the York Museums Trust collection.
