= Jacopo Chiavistelli =

Italian painter

Jacopo Chiavistelli (1618 or 1621 – 27 April 1698) was an Italian painter of the Baroque period, active mainly in his native city of Florence. He trained with Fabrizio Boschi and Michelangelo Colonna. He painted quadratura or painted architecture for the Palazzo Cerretani in Florence.
