= Teresio Maria Languasco =

Italian painter

Teresio Maria Languasco (1651–1698) was an Italian painter and an Augustinian friar.

Languasco was born in San Remo, Liguria. He studied under Giovanni Battista Carlone. In the monastery of the Augustinian order of Canons Regular of the Lateran, attached to San Niccolo of Tolentino of Genoa, he painted saints of his order. He also painted a Nativity of Mary for the Oratory of immacolata Concezione in San Remo; a Mater Misericodiae in chiaroscuro for the Church of the Gesuiti di Buonboschetto; a Madonna for a church in Albisola in the province of Savona; a Madonna Addolorata for the church of Santa Margherita in Recco; a Martyrdom of Santo Secondo for a church of Ventimiglia; and a San Nicola for the Augustinians of Ventimiglia. He painted eleven canvases with Saints of the Order for the sacristy of the Church of San Nicola da Tolentino in Genoa, as well as a Madonna for its refectory. He painted a St Augustine for the Sanctuary of the Madonnetta and a Madonna among Saints; ten canvases for the church of the Visitazione, and a Dispute of S. Agustine in Council. The critic L'Alizeri attributed the six Augustinian Martyrs once found in the library of San Nicola to Languasco. Michael Bryan erroneously calls him Teresa Maria.
