= Lan Ying =

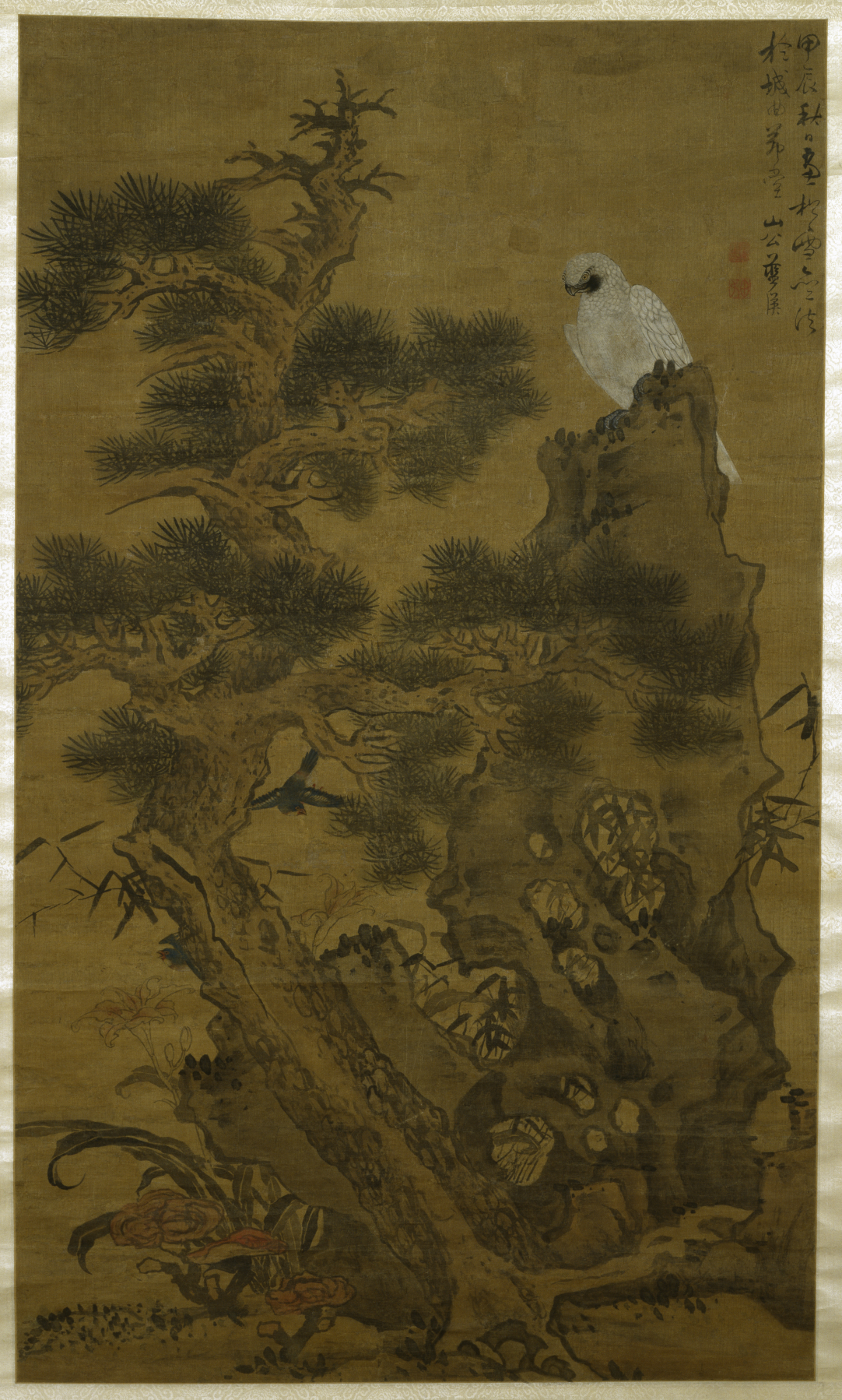
Landscape painted by Lan Ying

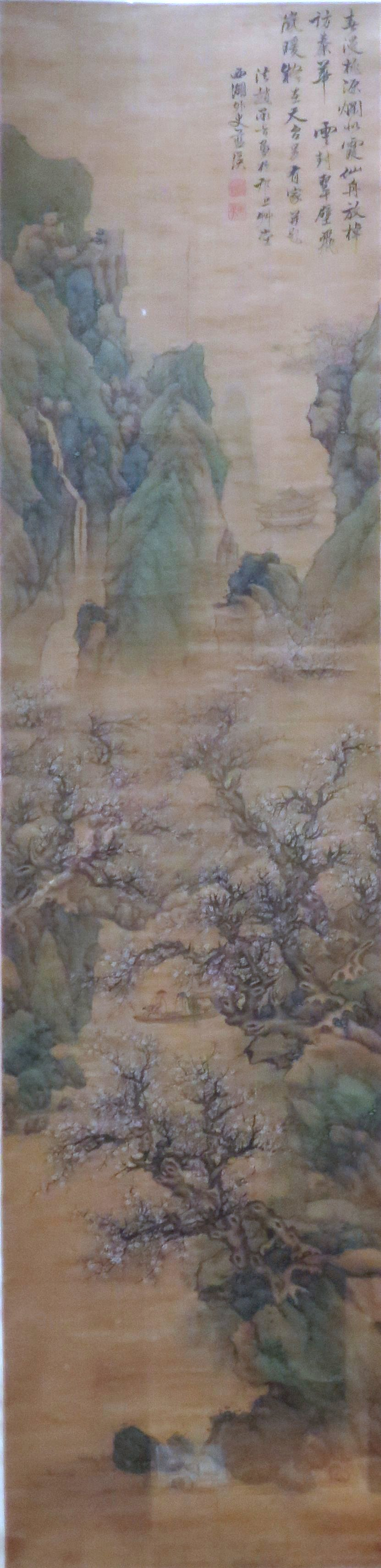
Peach Forest, painting by Lan Ying, Honolulu Museum of Art

Lan Ying (simplified Chinese: 蓝瑛; traditional Chinese: 藍瑛; pinyin: Lán Yīng; ca. 1585–1664) was a Chinese painter of landscapes, human figures, flowers and birds who was active during the Ming dynasty (1368–1644).

== Biography ==
Lan was born in Hangzhou in the Zhejiang province. His style name was 'Tianshu' (田叔), and his pseudonyms were 'Diesou' (蜨叟), 'Shi Toutuo' (石頭陀), and Dongguo laoren'. Lan's painting followed the style of Huang Gongwang and Wu Zhen. Lan was trained at the Painting Academy of the South Song dynasty. Lan's son Lan Yu and grandson Lan Shen also grew up to be painters.
