= Huang Binhong =

Chinese literati painter and art historian

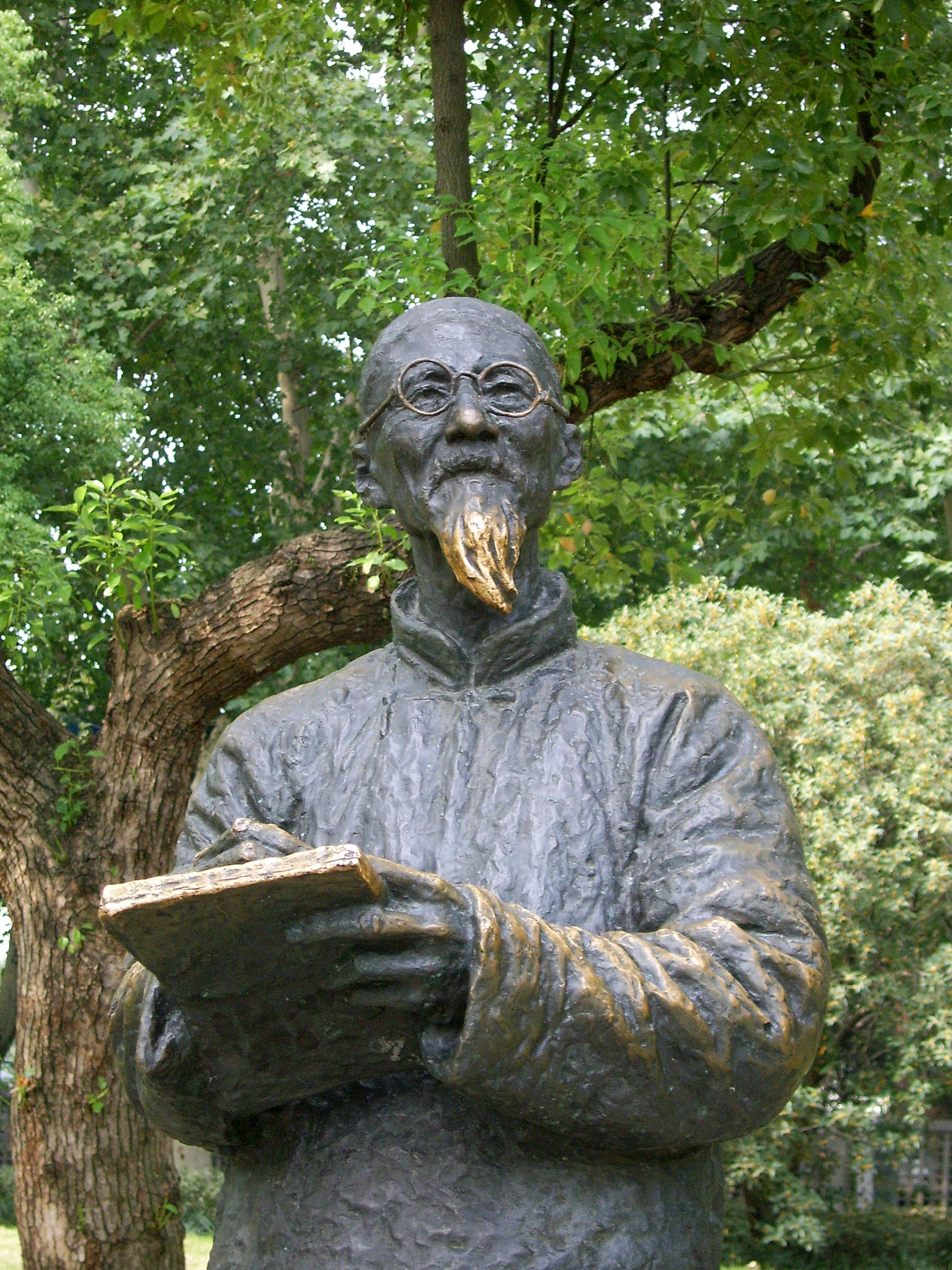
Statue of Huang Binhong at the West Lake in Hangzhou

Huang Binhong (Chinese: 黃賓虹; pinyin: Huáng Bīnhóng; January 27, 1865–March 25, 1955) was a Chinese literati painter and art historian born in Jinhua, Zhejiang province. His ancestral home was She County, Anhui province. He was the grandson of artist Huang Fengliu. He would later be associated with Shanghai and finally Hangzhou. He is considered one of the last innovators in the literati style of painting and is noted for his freehand landscapes.

== Biography ==
Huang's father was a merchant and art enthusiast, propelling Binhong interest in painting. However, his father's business collapsed in 1888; the family moved to Shexian (their native land). He would develop a connection with the land, growing a fondness towards Xinan literature and painting, which he would later emulate the styles of. Moreover, he collected and studying ancient seals.

As an opposer of the Manchu Dynasty, he became involved in revolutionary activities, but he fled to Shanghai when he was exposed. There, he became a publisher and editor for various art books.

== Artistic Inspiration ==
His early painting style showed the influence of Li Liufang (李流芳), Cheng Sui, Cheng Zhengkui, Kun Can, Hong Ren and the Yuan and Ming masters. It emphasized on the importance of the unification of positive and negative space; dark and light shades. Each brush line is powerful and precise. The compact touches, the graceful outlines and the elegant styles of Xin'an School of painting (新安画派) had a profound influence on Huang throughout his life. His style before the age of sixty is called the White-period.

From the 1920s onward, he served as a co-editor for his friend Deng Shi's fine arts book series Meishu congshu (美術叢書, Collection of Books on Fine Arts'), and managed his publishing house Fengyulou. After the age of sixty, Huang went to Guichi. The scenery of Guichi not only attracted the artist, but also had a great impact on his style. Huang changed from focusing on brush and line to focusing on ink and wash. He started to practice the painting style of Wu Zhen. In 1928, Huang visited Guangxi and Guangdong and created a lot of works by sketching the real landscapes. Huang started to transit from his "White style" to "Black style".

At the age of sixty nine to seventy, Huang visited Sichuan. He was inspired by the atmosphere of Mount Qingcheng in rain and the Qutang Gorge under moonlight. He utilized dripping, staining and layers of dense ink to illustrate the misty wet feeling of rain and the nightly view of mountains. Since then, his "black, dense, thick, heavy" style became his significant feature.

From 1937 to 1948, Huang lived in Beijing for eleven years and most of his Black period paintings were done during that time. After that, he moved to Hangzhou and started another new horizon in his art. Inspired by Western Impressionism, he integrated the two major Chinese painting systems (Ink and wash painting and color painting) into a unity. Dots of red, green and blue pigment merged with layers of dense ink creating a luxuriant and richly integrated style in which he deftly manipulated solid and void. His varied style and creativity not only won him an honorary title, but also brought light into the modern Chinese art history.

== Influence ==
He had significance for creating several societies devoted to painting and calligraphy.

== Additional Sources ==
  - Ding, Yuhua (2019). Chamber with Winds and Rains: On the Collecting Practice of Deng Shi and His Contemporaries (PhD thesis). Cornell University. doi:10.7298/6cq5-2g13.
- Ci hai bian ji wei yuan hui (辞海编辑委员会). Ci hai (辞海). Shanghai: Shanghai ci shu chu ban she (上海辞书出版社), 1979.
- Chinese Paintings in the Ashmolean Museum Oxford (67) Oxford ISBN 1-85444-132-9
