= 1604 in art =

Events from the year 1604 in art.

== Events ==
- Robert Peake the Elder is appointed picture maker to Henry Frederick, Prince of Wales.

== Publications ==
- Karel van Mander - Schilder-boeck

== Paintings ==
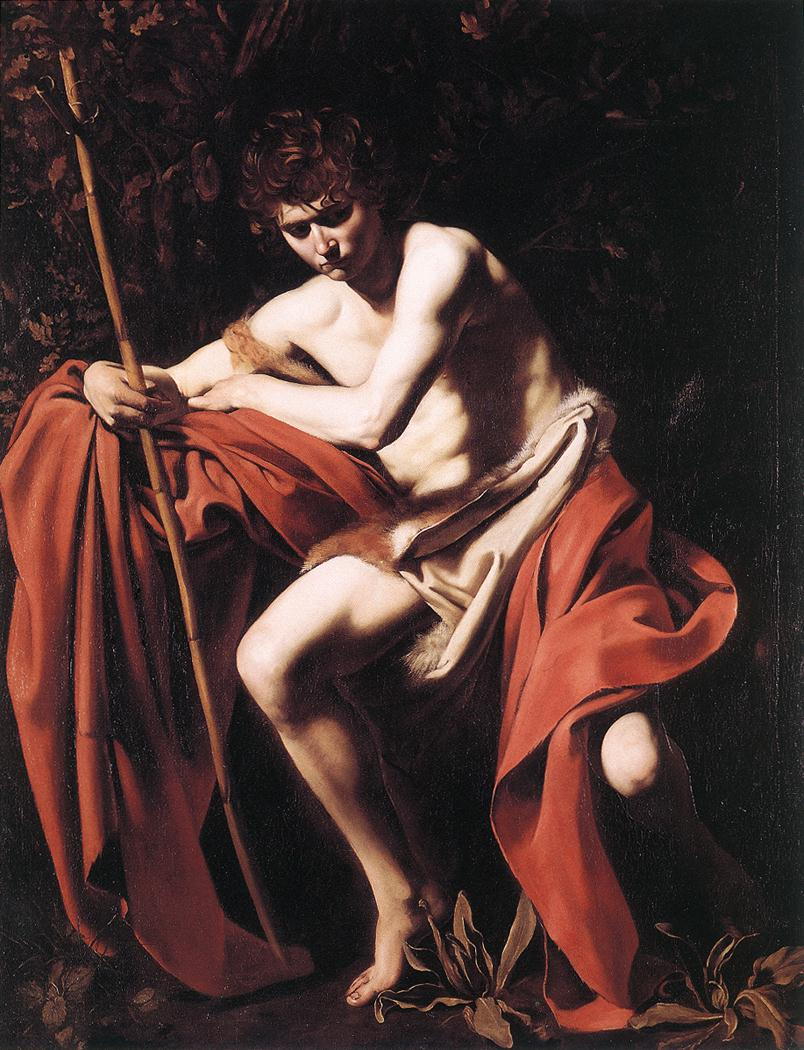
Caravaggio, John the Baptist (Kansas City)

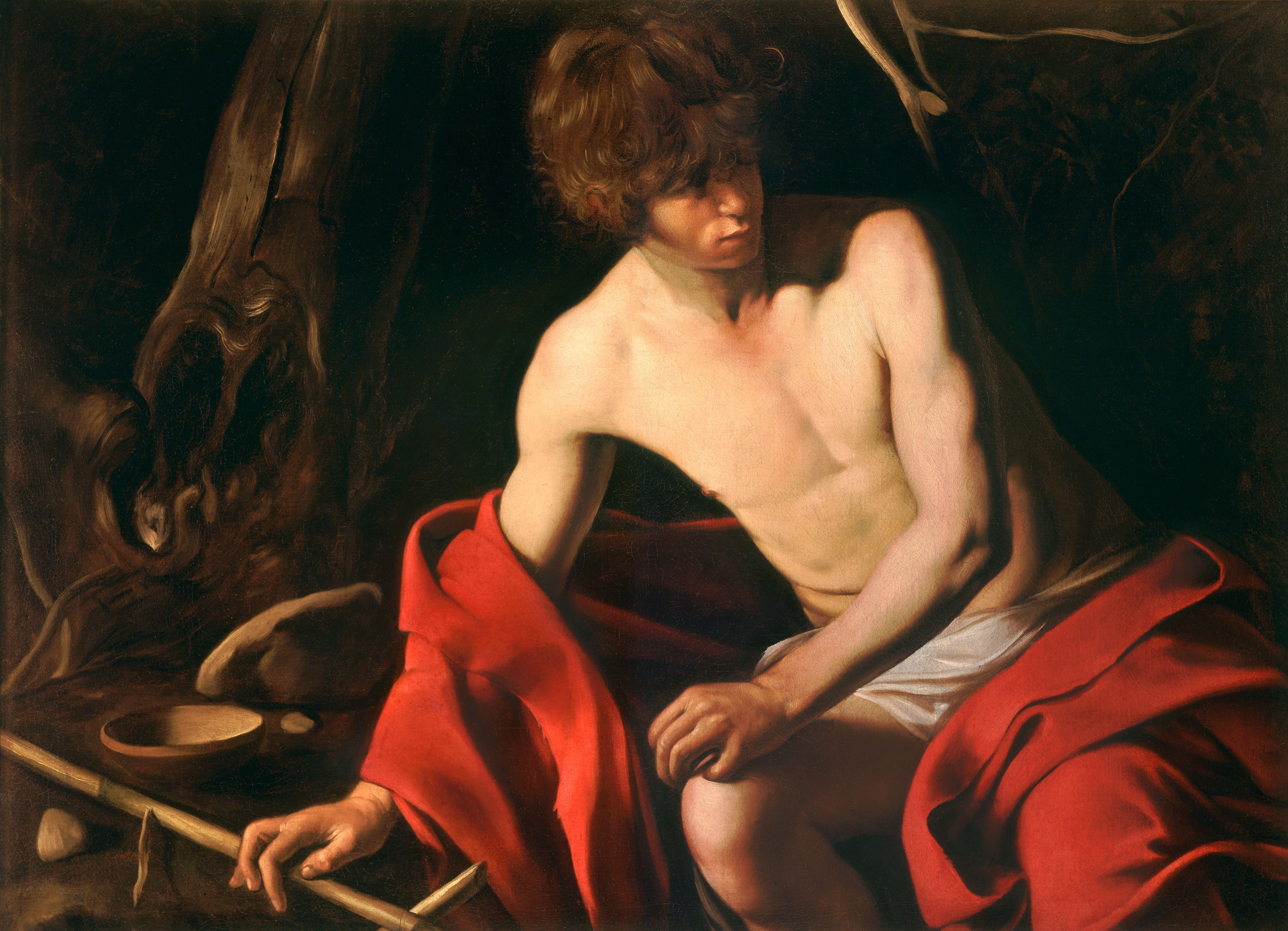
Caravaggio, John the Baptist (Galleria Nazionale d'Arte Antica)

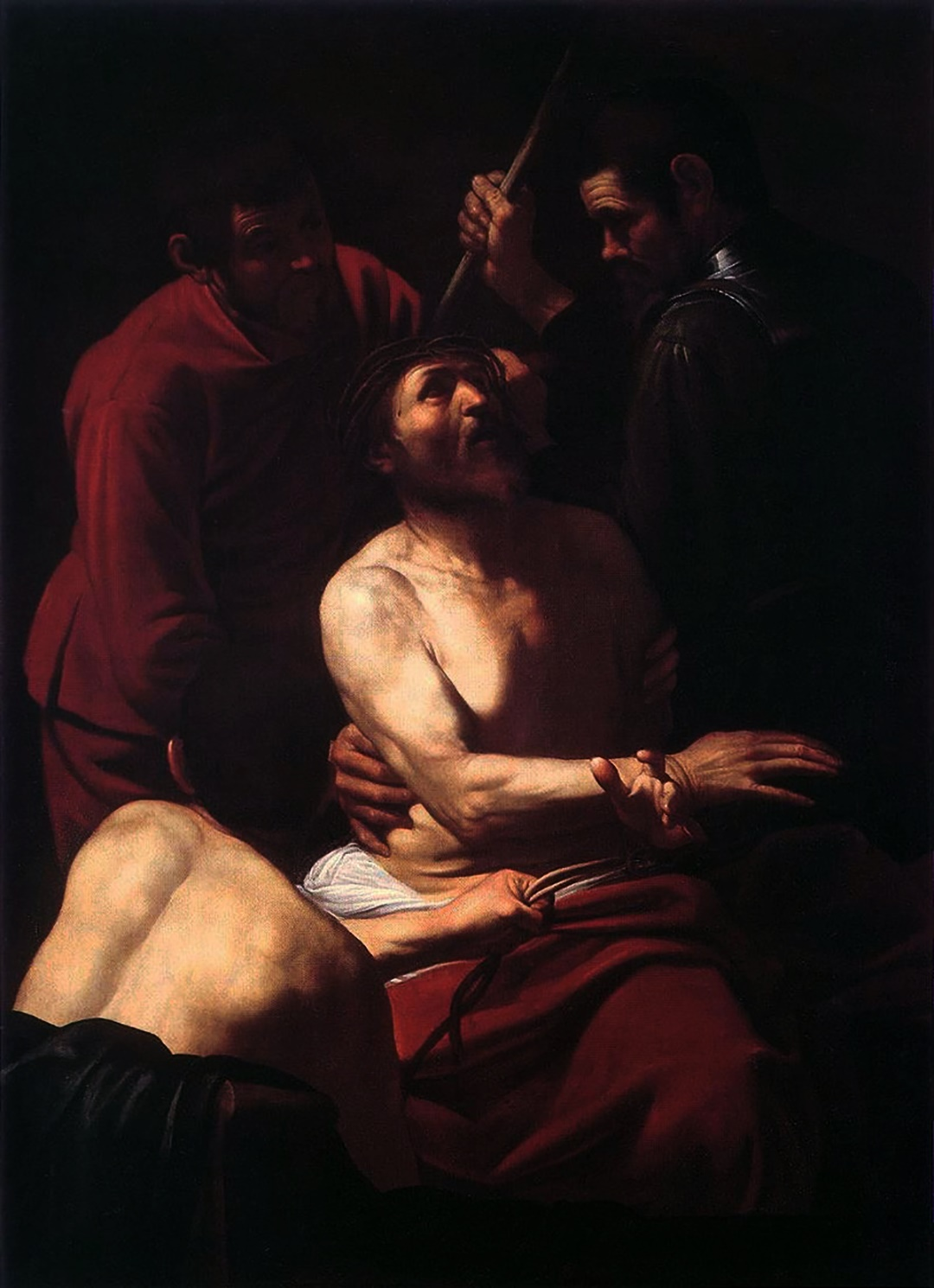
Caravaggio, The Crowning with Thorns
- Annibale Carracci (approximate date)
  - Landscape with the Flight into Egypt (Doria Pamphilj Gallery, Rome)
  - The Martyrdom of St. Stephen (The Louvre, Paris)
  - Monsignor Agucchi (York Art Gallery, England)
  - Self-portrait (Hermitage Museum, Saint Petersburg)
- Caravaggio
  - John the Baptist (Kansas City)
  - John the Baptist (Galleria Nazionale d'Arte Antica, Rome)
  - The Crowning with Thorns (Prato)

== Births ==
- February 6 - Jean Varin, French sculptor and engraver (died 1672)
- July 8 - Christiaen van Couwenbergh, Dutch Golden Age painter (died 1667)
- September 21 - Angelo Michele Colonna, Italian painter of frescoes (died 1687)
- date unknown
  - François Anguier, French sculptor (died 1669)
  - Mario Balassi, Italian painter (died 1667)
  - Giovanni Giacomo Barbelli, Italian painter, active in Brescia (died 1656)
  - Charles Beaubrun, French portrait painter (died 1692)
  - Bartolommeo Bianco, Italian architect, engineer, and painter (died 1656)
  - Luigi Baccio del Bianco, Italian architect, engineer, scenic designer and painter (died 1657)
  - Pierre Daret, French portrait painter and engraver (died 1678)
  - Chöying Dorje, 10th Karmapa, head of the Kagyu School of Tibetan Buddhism and a painter and sculptor (died 1674)
  - Gijsbert d'Hondecoeter, Dutch painter of barnyard fowl (died 1653), father of Melchior d'Hondecoeter.
  - Johann Anton Eismann, Austrian painter (died 1698)
  - Giovanni Battista Michelini, Italian painter of religious and mythological subjects (died 1655)
  - Jan Baptist van Heil, Flemish painter (died 1688)
  - Cheng Zhengkui, Chinese landscape painter and poet (died 1670)
- probable
  - Jan Boeckhorst, German-born Flemish Baroque painter (died 1668)
  - Viviano Codazzi, Italian architectural painter (died 1670)

== Deaths ==
- March 1 - Leonhard Baumhauer, German sculptor (born 1535)
- date unknown
  - Pier Angelo Basili, Italian painter born in Gubbio (born 1550)
  - Ottavio Semini, Italian painter born and trained in Genoa (born 1530)
- probable - William Rogers, English engraver (born 1545)
