= Hongren =

Hongren may refer to:

- Daman Hongren (601- 674), Buddhist teacher
- Hong Ren (1610-1664), Chinese painter
