= 弘仁 =

弘仁 may refer to:

- Kōnin (era), Japanese era name corresponding to September 810 through January 824
- Hong Ren, a Chinese Buddhist monk and painter in the early Qing dynasty
