= Wang Kangle =

Wang Kangle (Chinese: 王康乐; pinyin: Wáng Kānglè; 1907–2006) was a Chinese painter born in Fenghua, Zhejiang province.

== Biography ==
Wang Kangle showed his brilliance in art at a young age and was recruited by the Shanghai Commercial Press at age 18. Wang Kangle worked as a designer in the Images Department of the Shanghai Commercial Press from 1924 to 1932. He later studied landscape painting under the guidance of Zhang Daqian, Huang Binhong and Zheng Wuchang. Throughout the prime of his life, he contented himself with consulting jade manufacturers and teaching art as the Communist Revolution strongly frowned upon prominent artists.

After the Revolution, he traveled across China and began to develop the style that he is known for today. In 1952, he began to lecture at the Shanghai People's Fine Arts Publishing House and the Shanghai Fine Arts College. He held solo exhibitions in Hong Kong, Singapore and New York. He served as a member of Shanghai Research Institute of Culture and History, member of Shanghai Artists' Association, advisor to Huang BinHong Research Society, vice-chairman of Calligraphy and Painting Society of Shanghai and Hong Kong DeFeng Studio.

Today, his artworks can be found in Wang Kangle Art Museum (王康乐艺术馆) located in City of Ningbo, Zhejiang province at the Xikou Yan Creek River. The 王康乐艺术馆 covers a total area of 12,000 square meters, building area of 3000 square meters. Ground was broken in 1996, the entire project totals and investment of more than 400 million yuan of which Mr. Wang Kangle invested 650,000 yuan and 300 pieces of his fine art. Today, the venue serves exhibition, creative, artistic research, as well as hospitality functions.

== Sources ==
- 王康乐
