= Figurative art =

Art that depicts real object sources

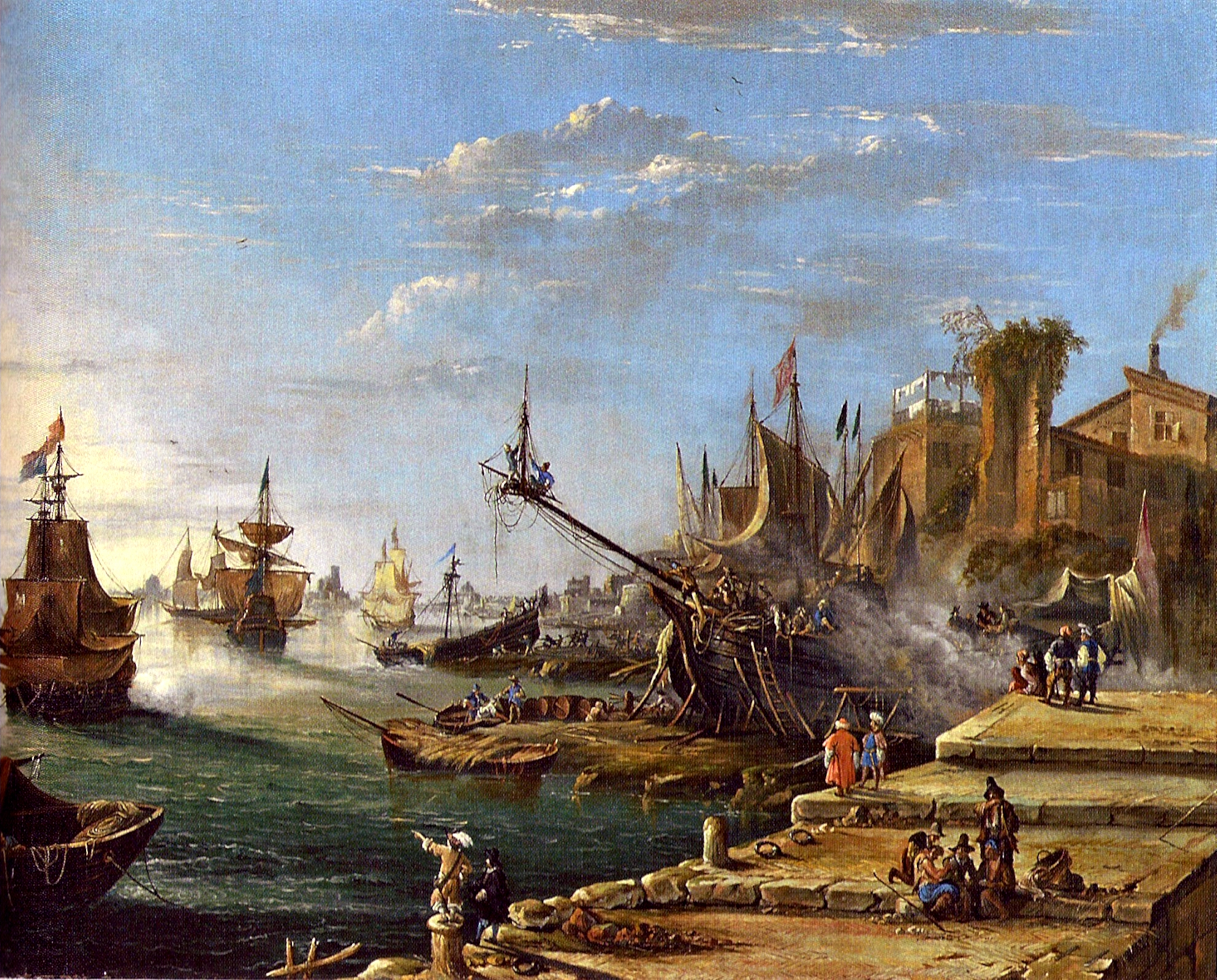
Ein Meerhafen ("A Seaport"), a figurative landscape by the Austrian artist Johann Anton Eismann (1604–1698), which depicts buildings, people, ships, and other features that can be distinguished individually; by contrast, the abstract landscape below suggests its subject matter without directly representing it

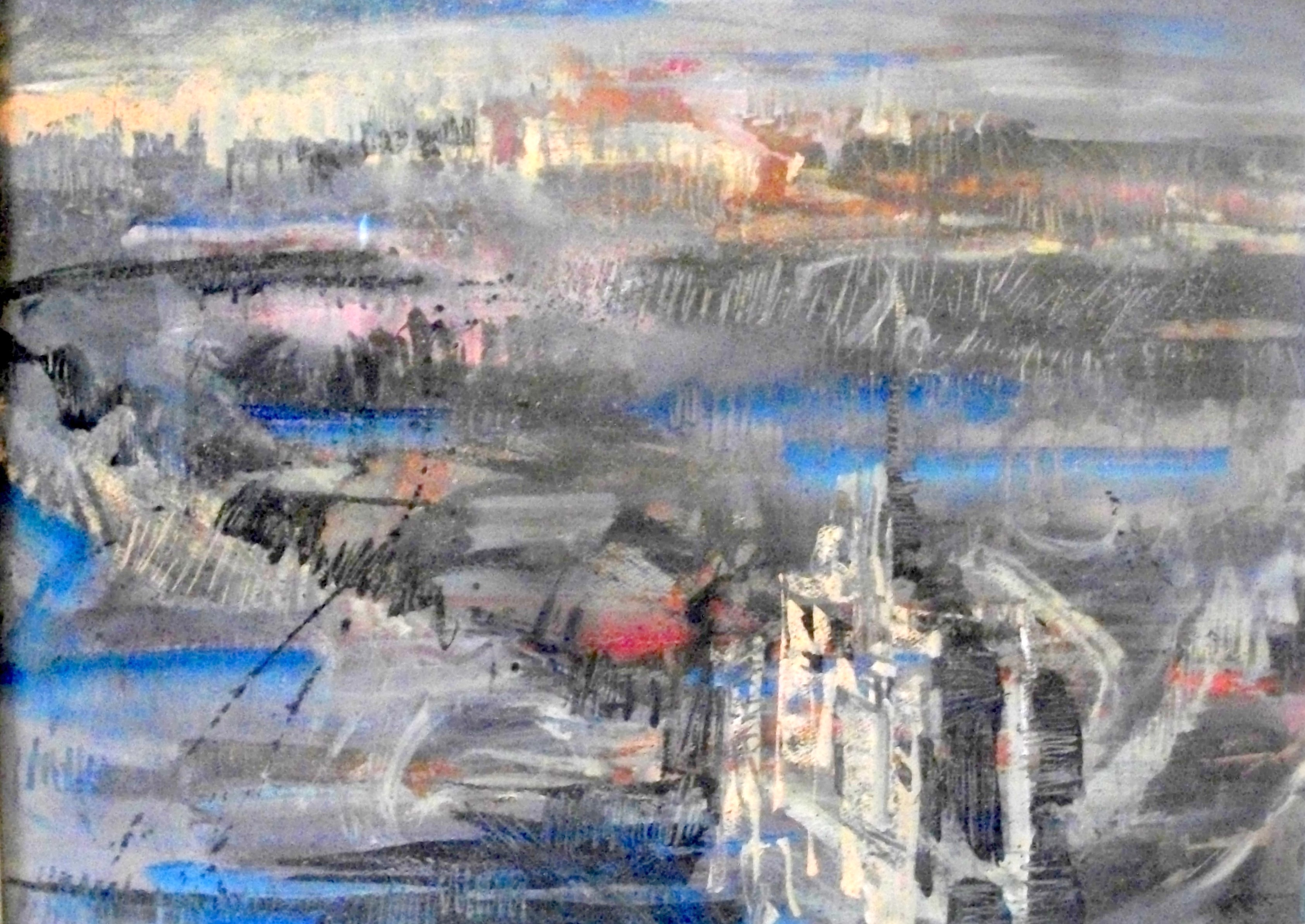
Untitled abstract expressionist landscape by the American artist Jay Meuser (1911–1963)

Figurative art, sometimes written as figurativism, describes artwork (particularly paintings and sculptures) that is clearly derived from real object sources and so is, by definition, representational. The term is often in contrast to abstract art:

Since the arrival of abstract art the term figurative has been used to refer to any form of modern art that retains strong references to the real world.

Painting and sculpture can therefore be divided into the categories of figurative, representational and abstract, although, strictly speaking, abstract art is derived (or abstracted) from a figurative or other natural source. However, "abstract" is sometimes used as a synonym of non-representational art and non-objective art, i.e. art which has no derivation from figures or objects.

Figurative art is not synonymous with figure painting (art that represents the human figure), although human and animal figures are frequent subjects.

== Formal elements ==
The formal elements, those aesthetic effects created by design, upon which figurative art is dependent, include line, shape, color, light and dark, mass, volume, texture, and perspective, although these elements of design could also play a role in creating other types of imagery—for instance abstract, or non-representational or non-objective two-dimensional artwork. The difference is that in figurative art these elements are deployed to create an impression or illusion of form and space, and, usually, to create emphasis in the narrative portrayed.

Sleeping Venus (a.k.a. Dresden Venus)
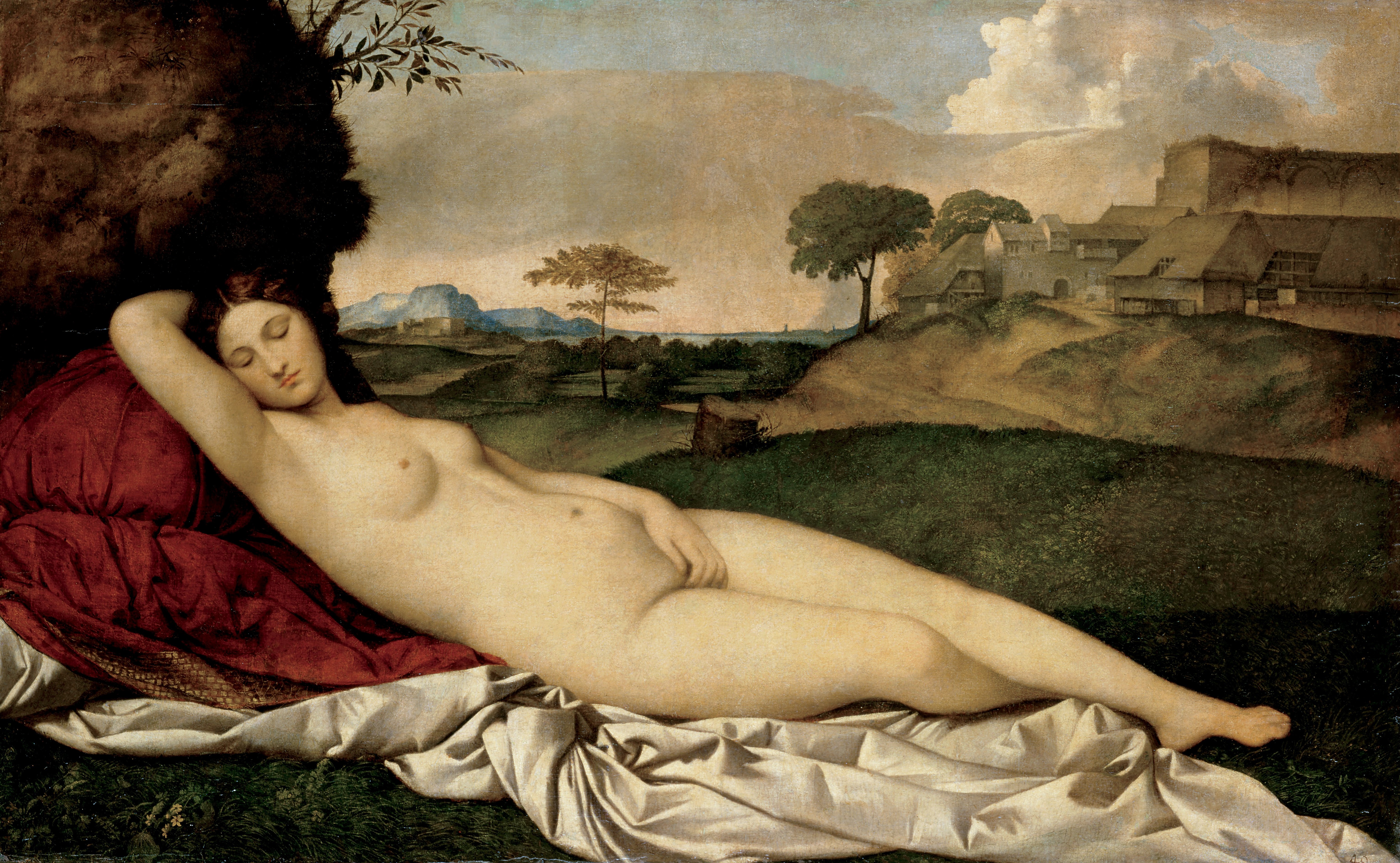
- First known reclining nude in Western Art. Introduced the female nude as subject.
- Artist: Giorgione
- Year: c. 1510
- Dimensions: 108.5 cm × 175 cm (42.7 in × 68.9 in)

== Evolution ==
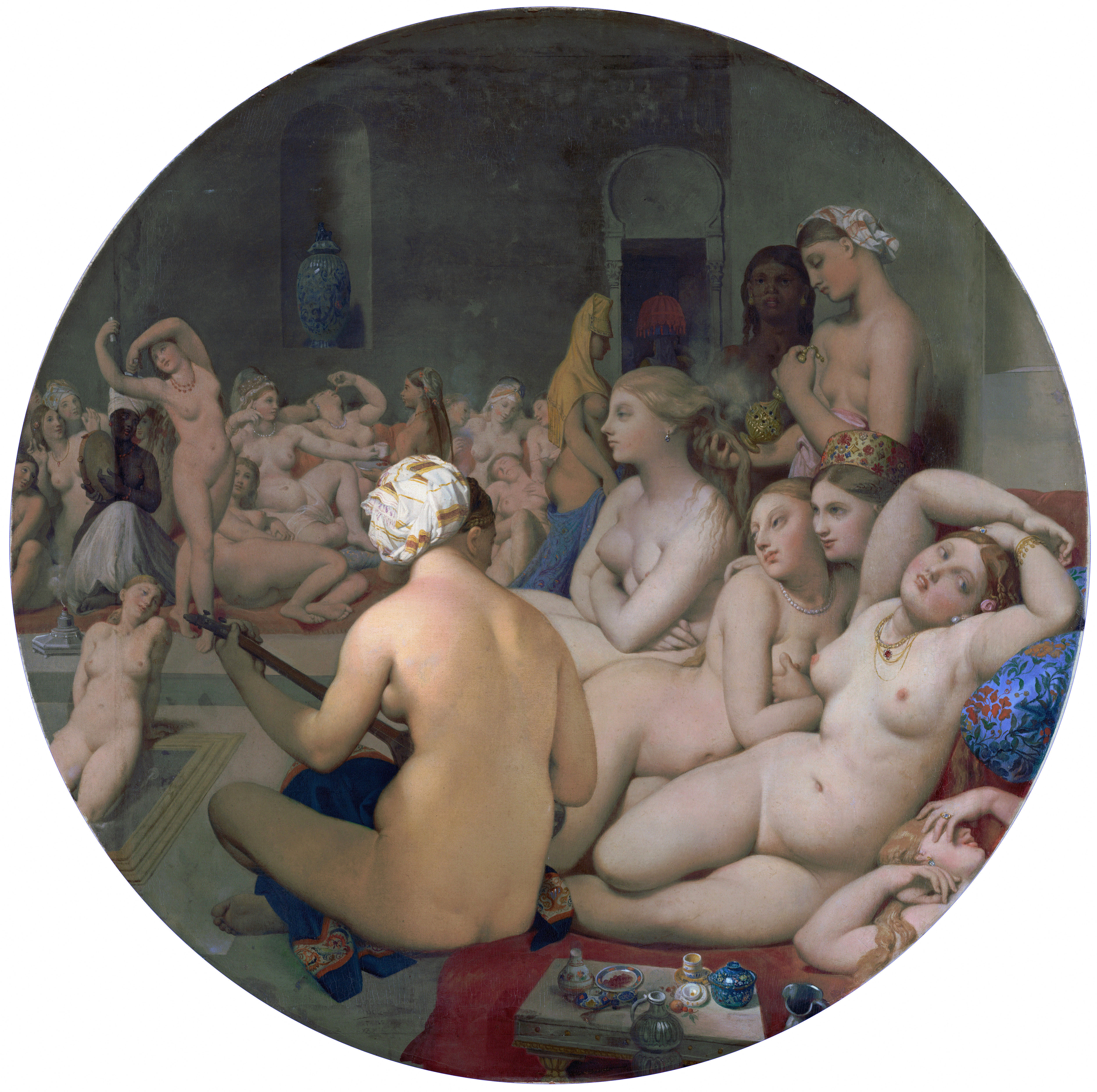
Jean Auguste Dominique Ingres, Le Bain Turc (The Turkish bath), 1862, oil on canvas, 108 × 110 cm, Louvre, Paris

Figurative art is itself based upon a tacit understanding of abstracted shapes: the figure sculpture of Greek antiquity was not naturalistic, for its forms were idealized and geometric. Ernst Gombrich referred to the strictures of this schematic imagery, the adherence to that which was already known, rather than that which is seen, as the "Egyptian method", an allusion to the memory-based clarity of imagery in Egyptian art. Eventually idealization gave way to observation, and a figurative art which balanced ideal geometry with greater realism was seen in Classical sculpture by 480 B.C. The Greeks referred to the reliance on visual observation as mimesis. Until the time of the Impressionists, figurative art was characterized by attempts to reconcile these opposing principles.

From the early Renaissance, Mannerism and the Baroque through 18th-, 19th- and 20th-century painting Figurative art has steadily broadened its parameters. An important landmark in the evolution of figurative art is the first known reclining nude in Western painting in Sleeping Venus (1510) by Giorgione. It introduced the female nude as subject and started a long line of famous paintings.

Nicolas Poussin (1594–1665), a French painter in the classical style whose work predominantly features clarity, logic, and order, and favors line over color, served as an alternative to the more narrative Baroque style of the 17th century. He was a major inspiration for such classically oriented artists as Jacques-Louis David, Jean-Auguste-Dominique Ingres and Paul Cézanne. The rise of the Neoclassical art of Jacques-Louis David ultimately engendered the realistic reactions of Gustave Courbet and Édouard Manet leading to the multi-faceted figurative art of the 20th century.

In November, 2018, scientists reported the discovery of the oldest known figurative art painting, over 40,000 (perhaps as old as 52,000) years old, of an unknown animal, in the cave of Lubang Jeriji Saléh on the Indonesian island of Borneo.

== Architecture, townscape ==
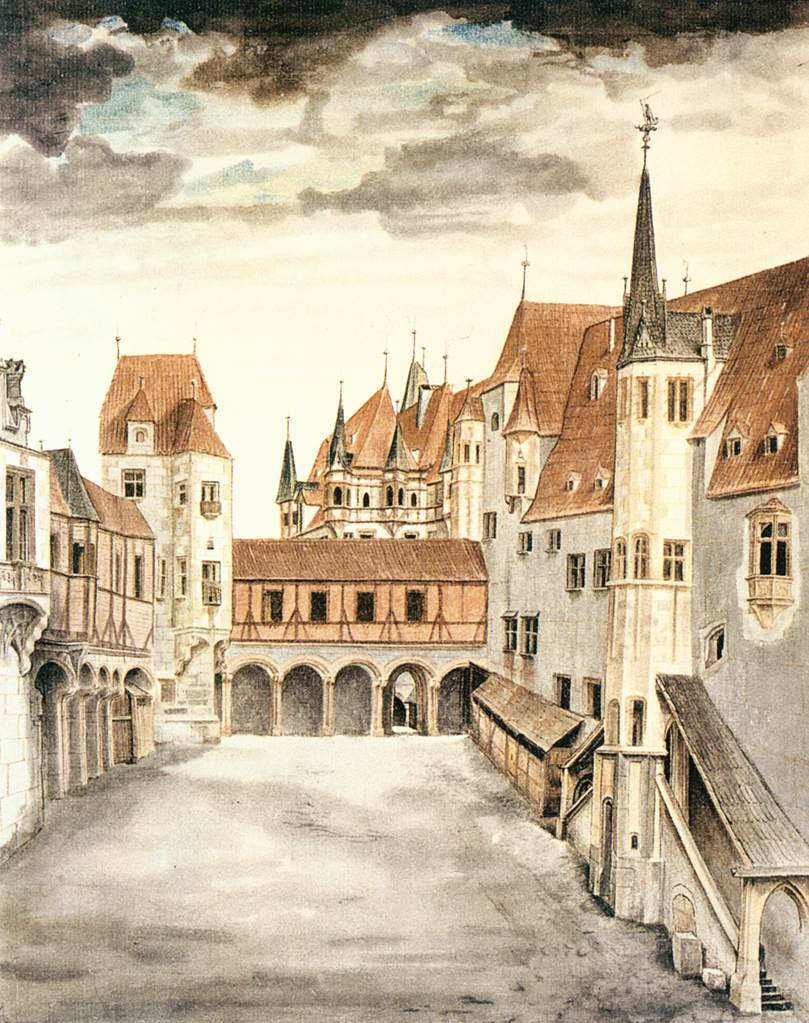
Albrecht Dürer (1494) Courtyard of Innsbruck Castle

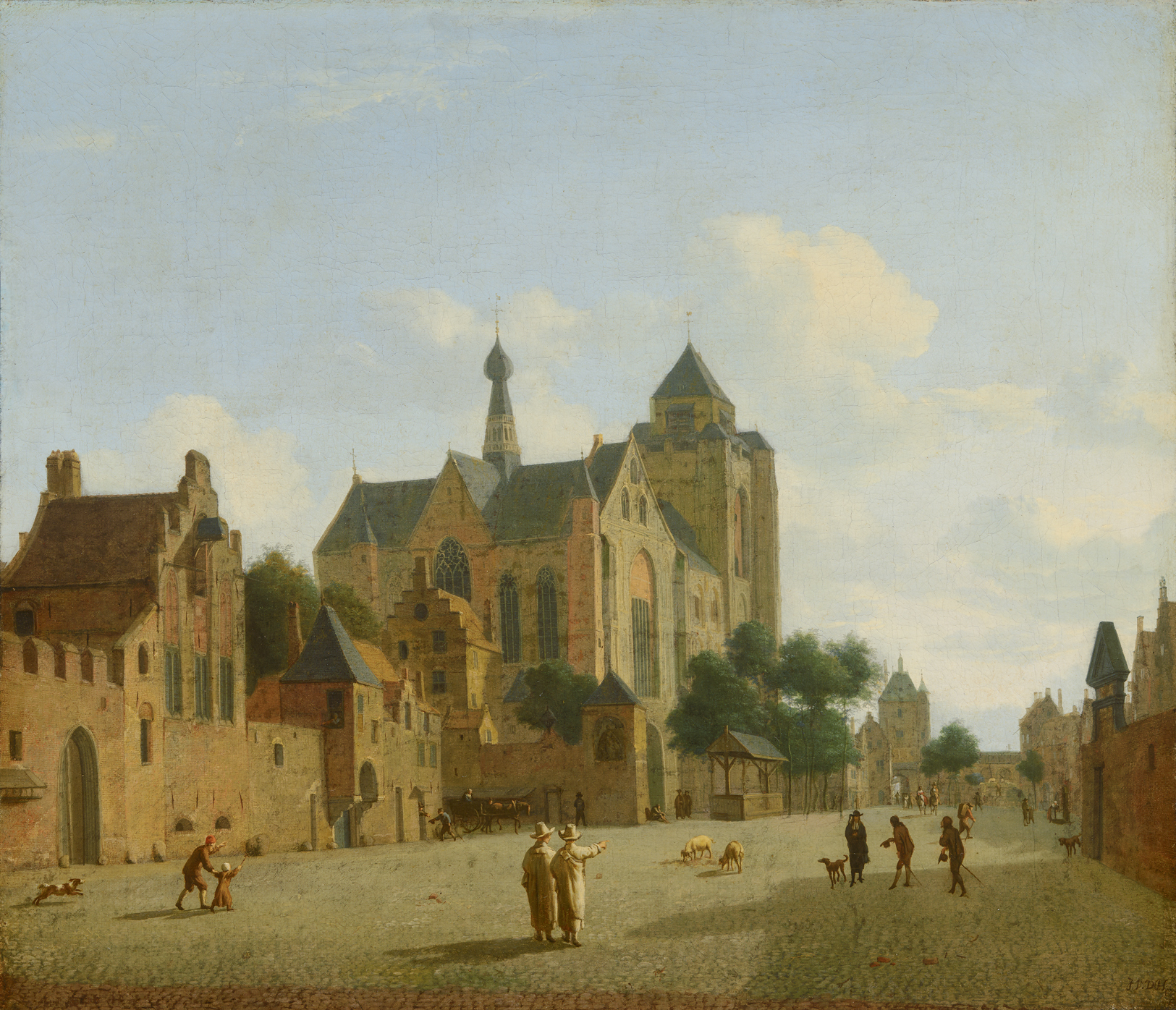
Jan van der Heyden (1652) The Church at Veere

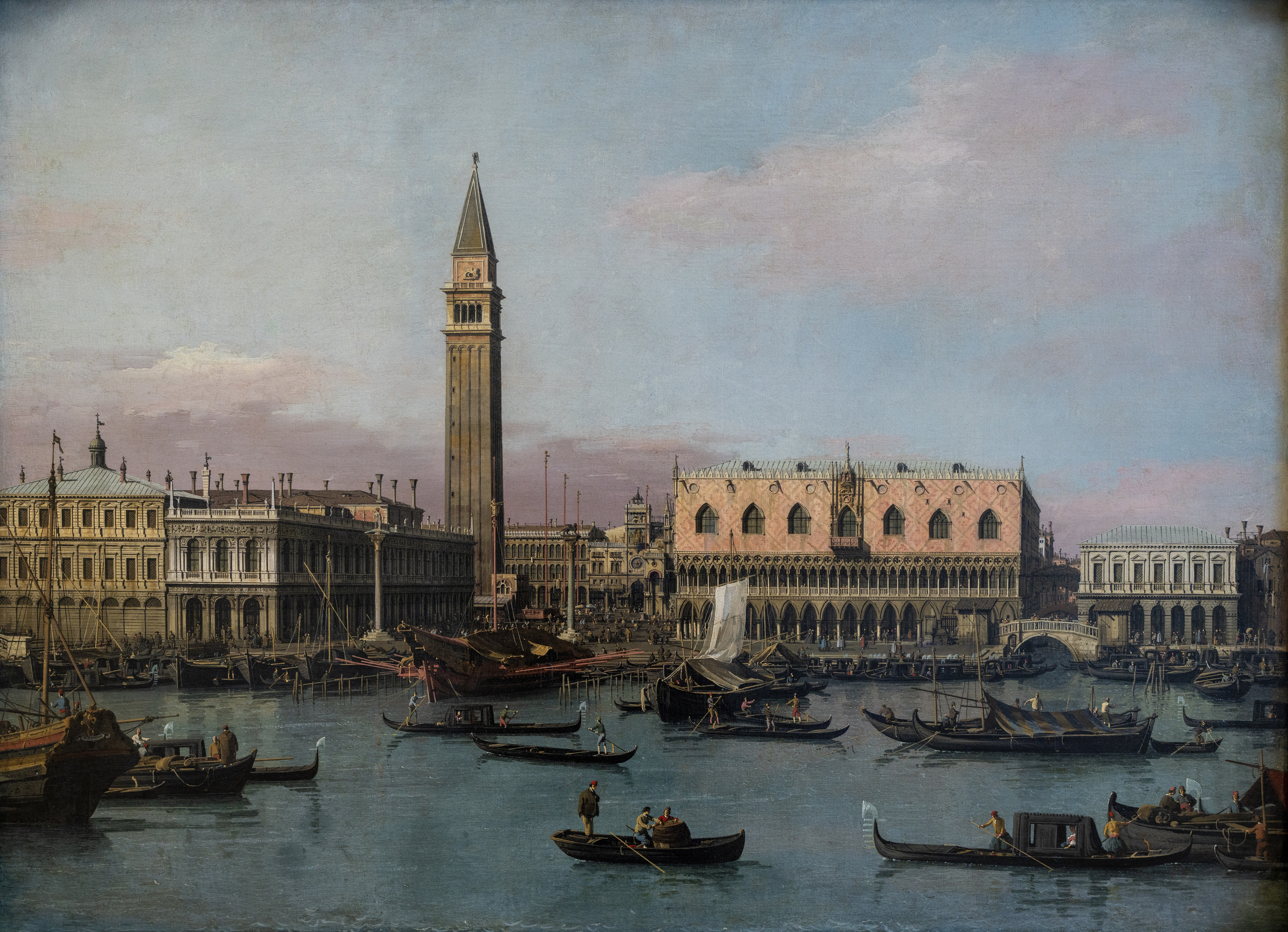
Canaletto (c. 1737) View of the Piazzetta and The Bassin of San Marco in Venice

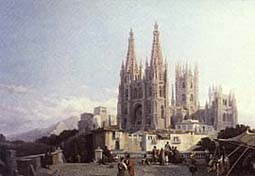
Burgos Cathedral (1851) by François Bossuet

== History painting ==
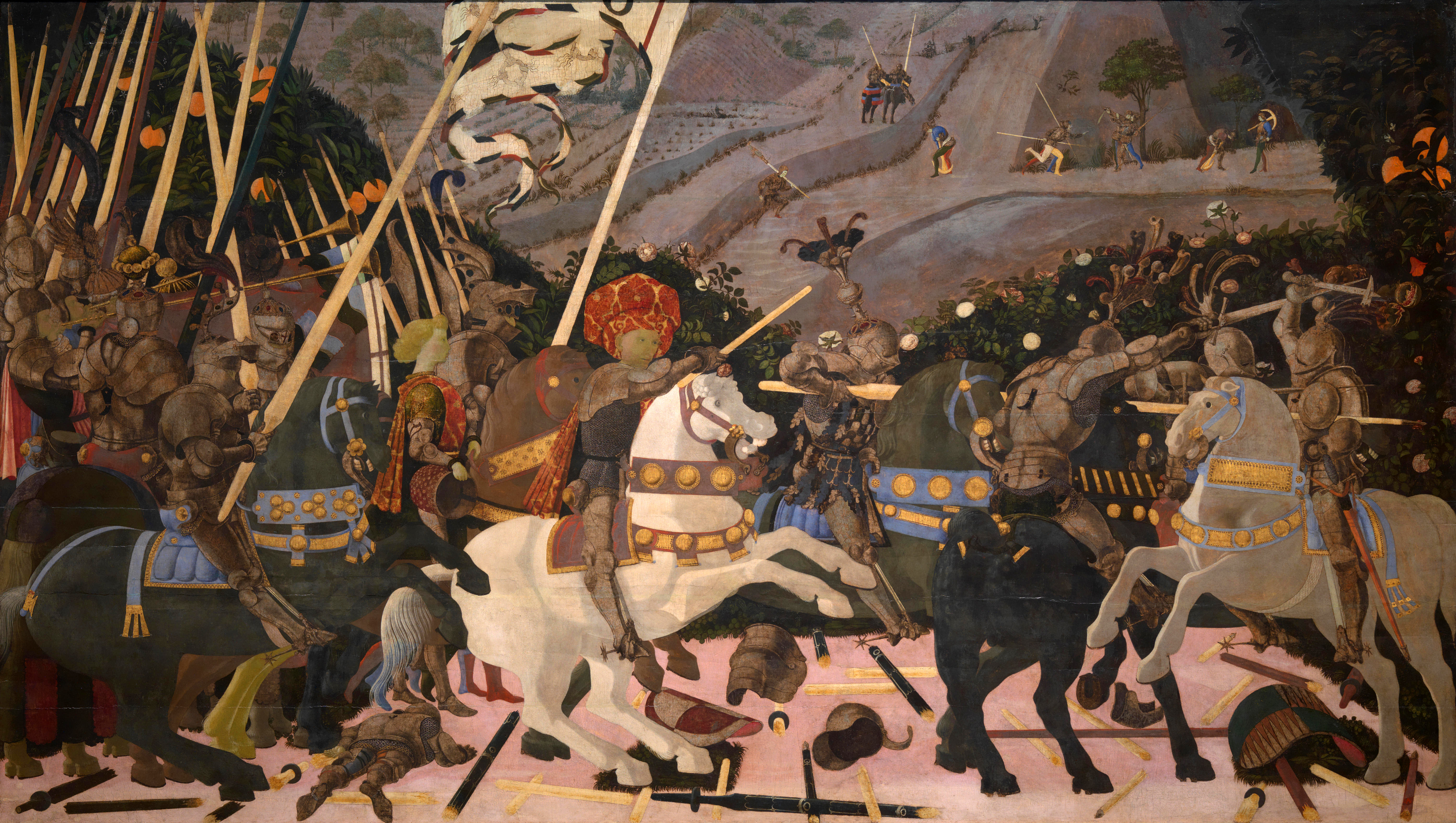
Paolo Uccello (1438–1440) The Battle of San Romano

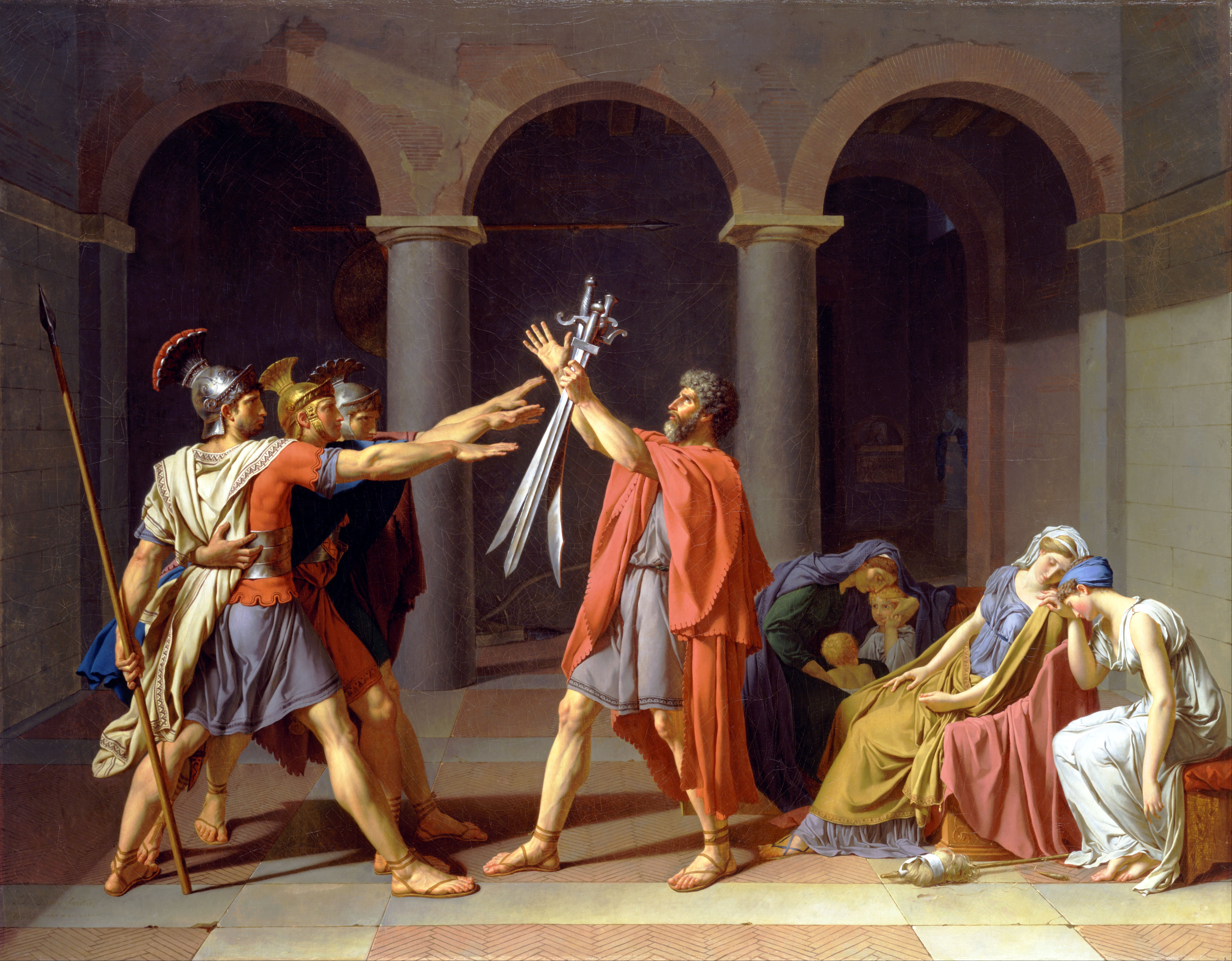
Jacques-Louis David (1786) Oath of the Horatii

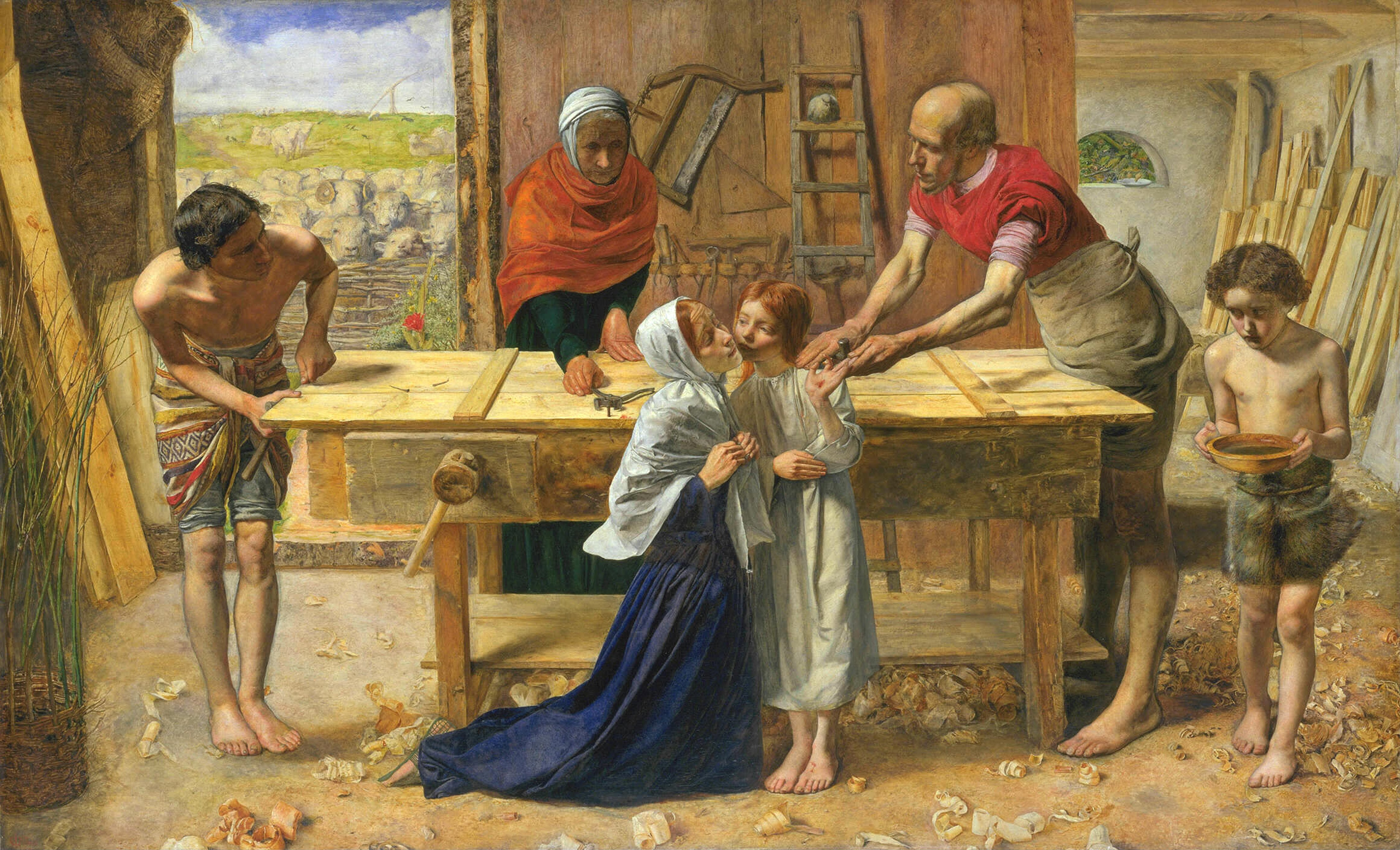
John Everett Millais (1854–1860) Christ In The House Of His Parents

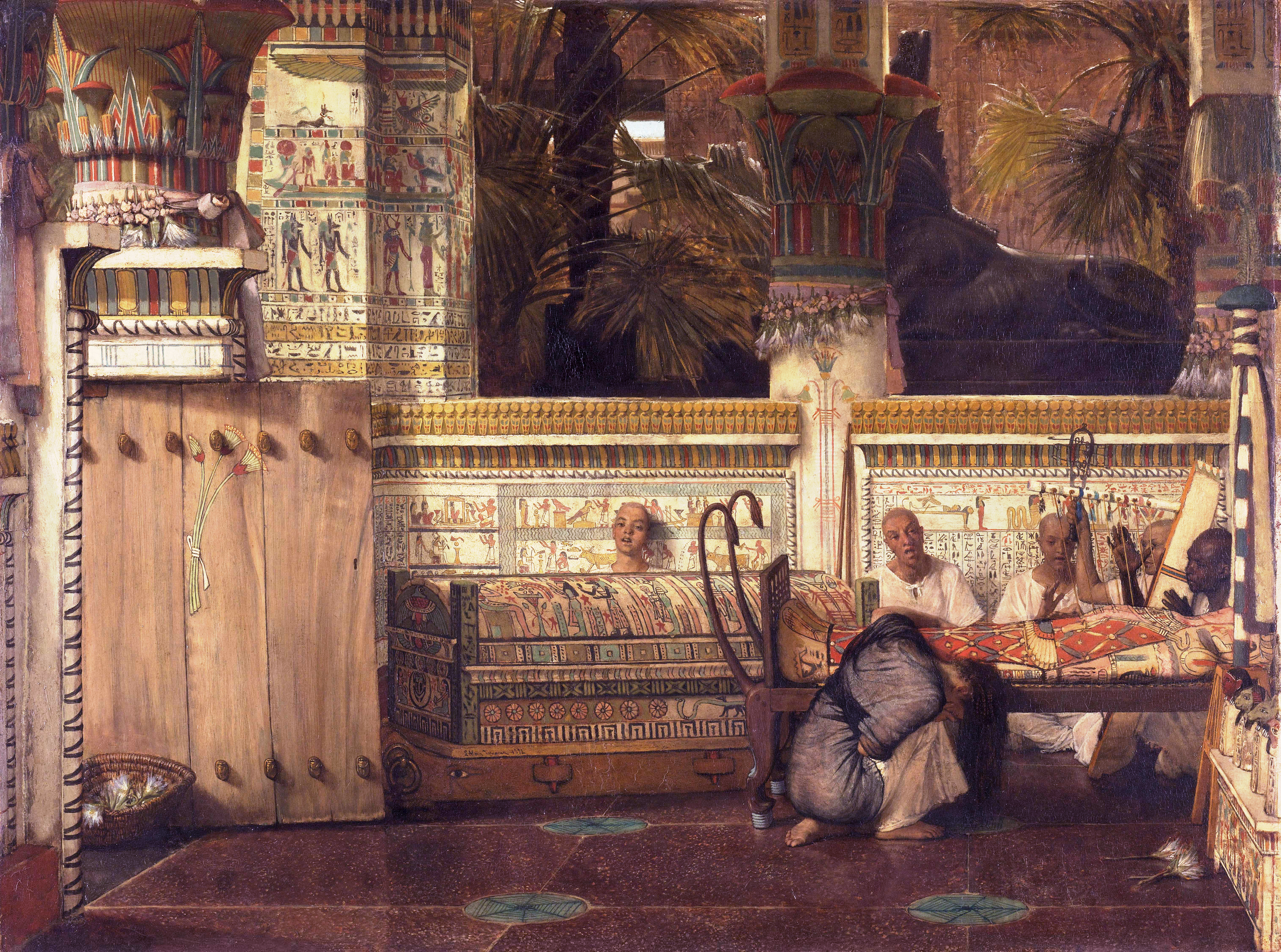
Lawrence Alma-Tadema (1872) The Egyptian Widow

== Human forms ==
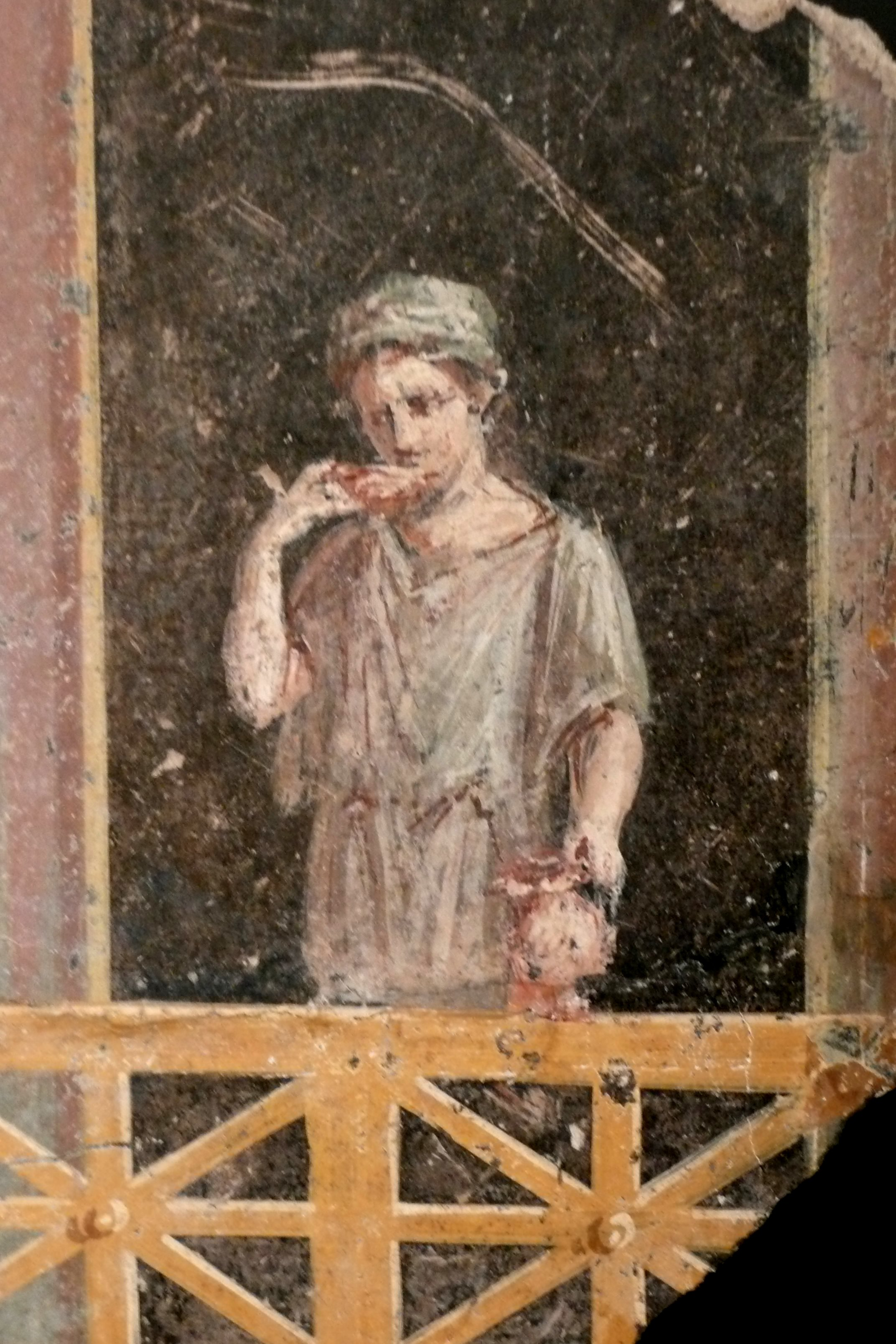
Ancient Roman woman on a balcony (9–14 CE), Getty Villa

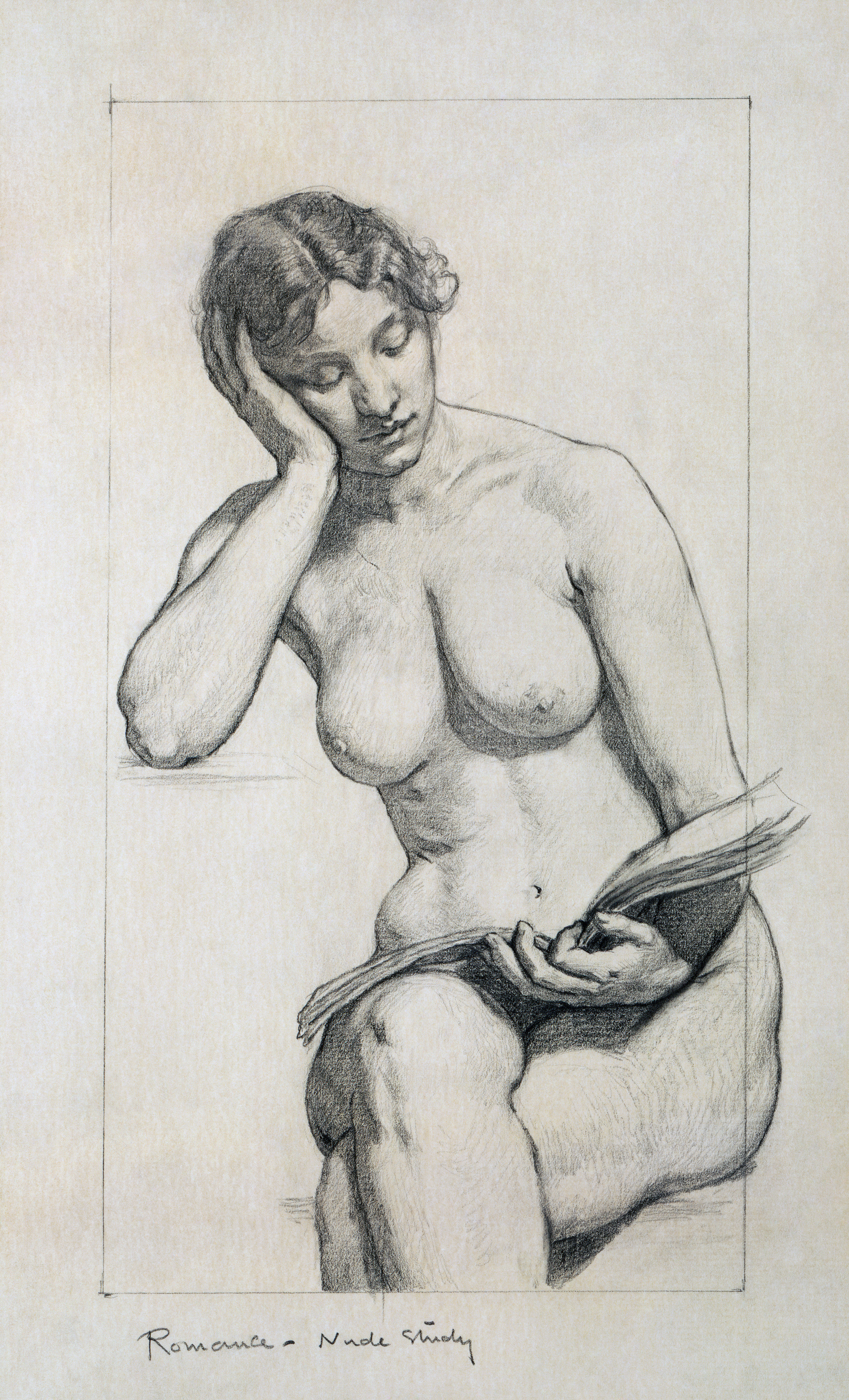
Kenyon Cox (1896) Nude study

Joseph Csaky (1911–1912) Groupe de femmes (Group of Women), plaster

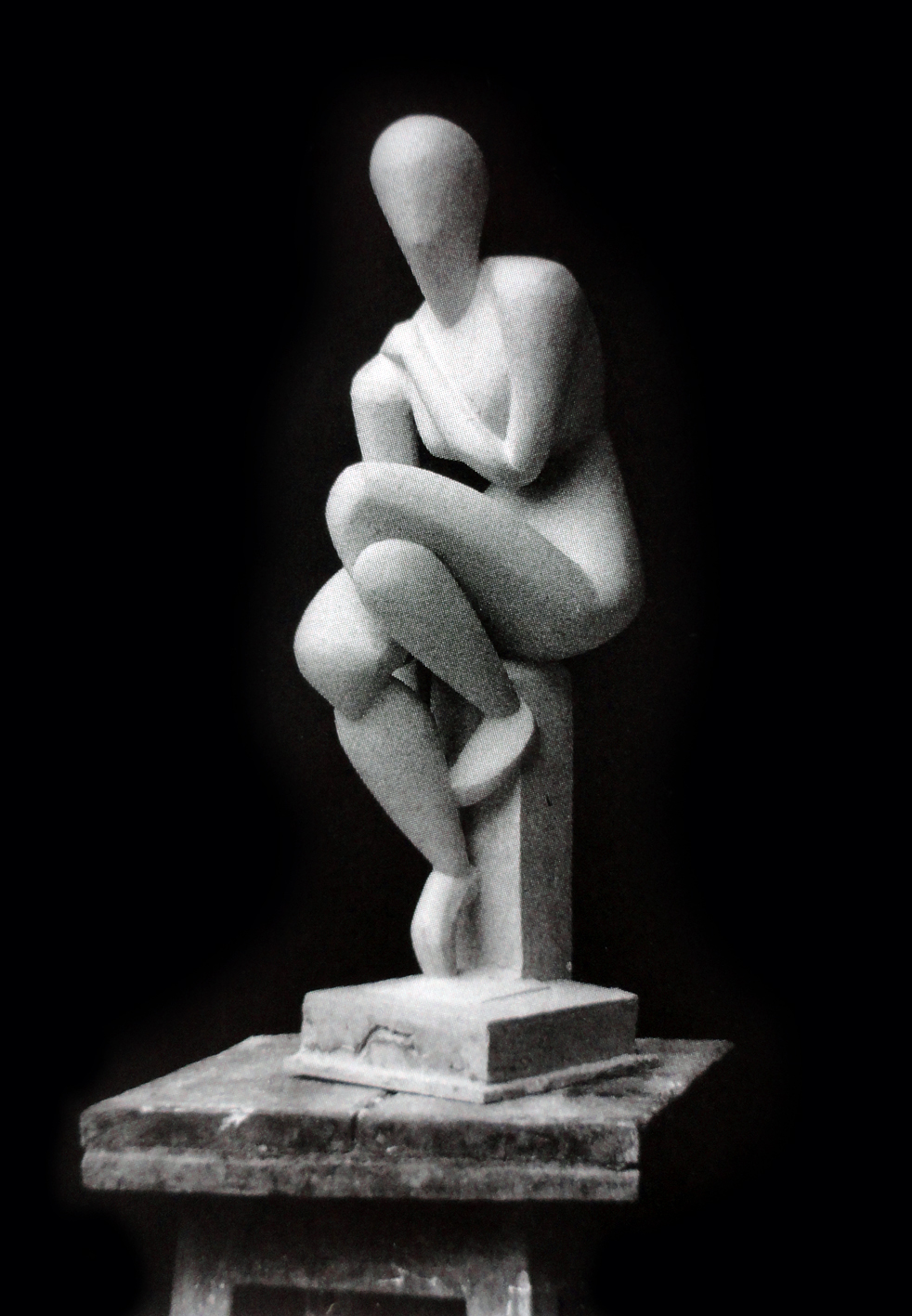
Raymond Duchamp-Villon (1914) Femme assise, plaster

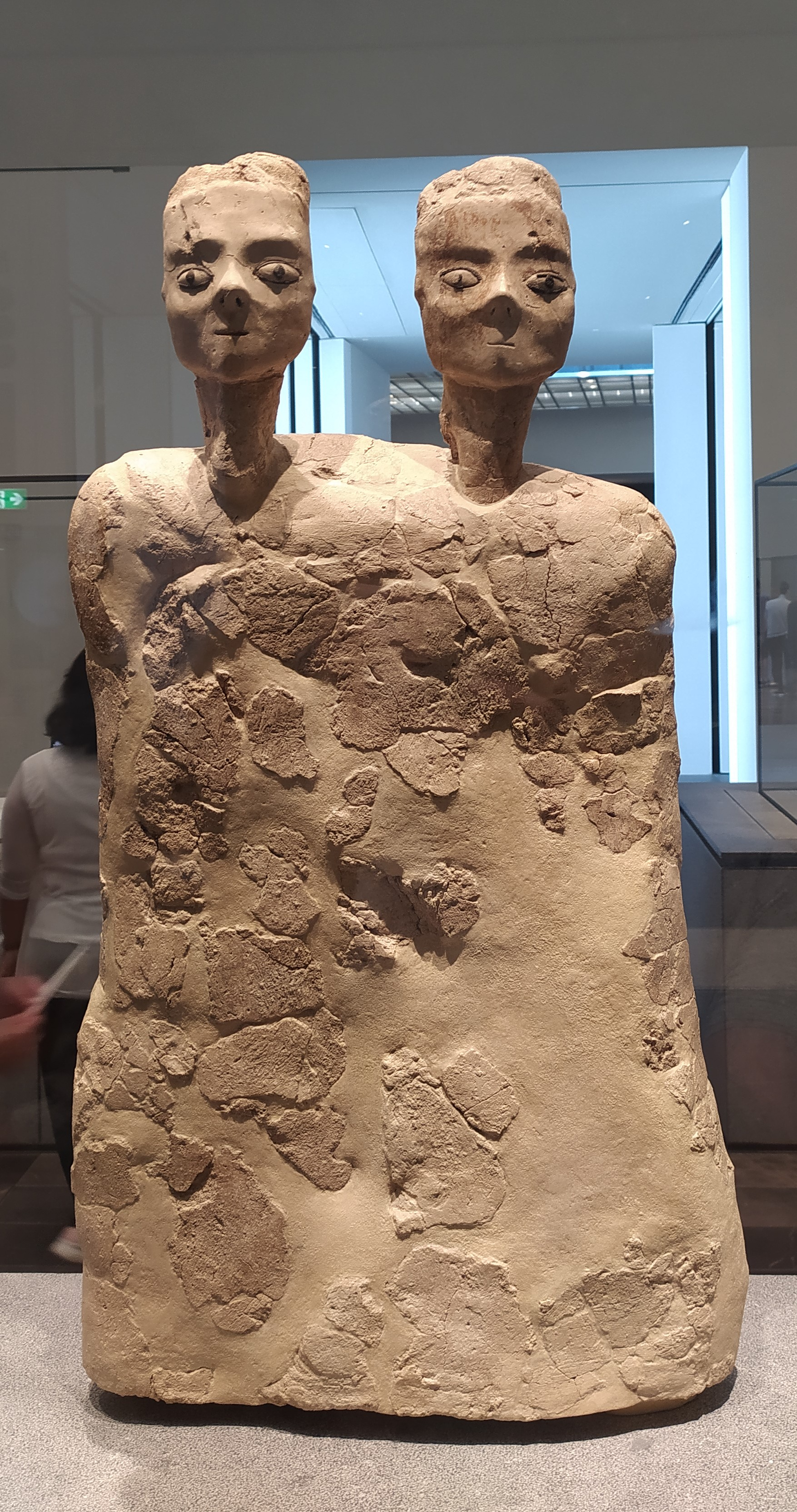
ʿAin Ghazal statues, from approximately 9000 years ago

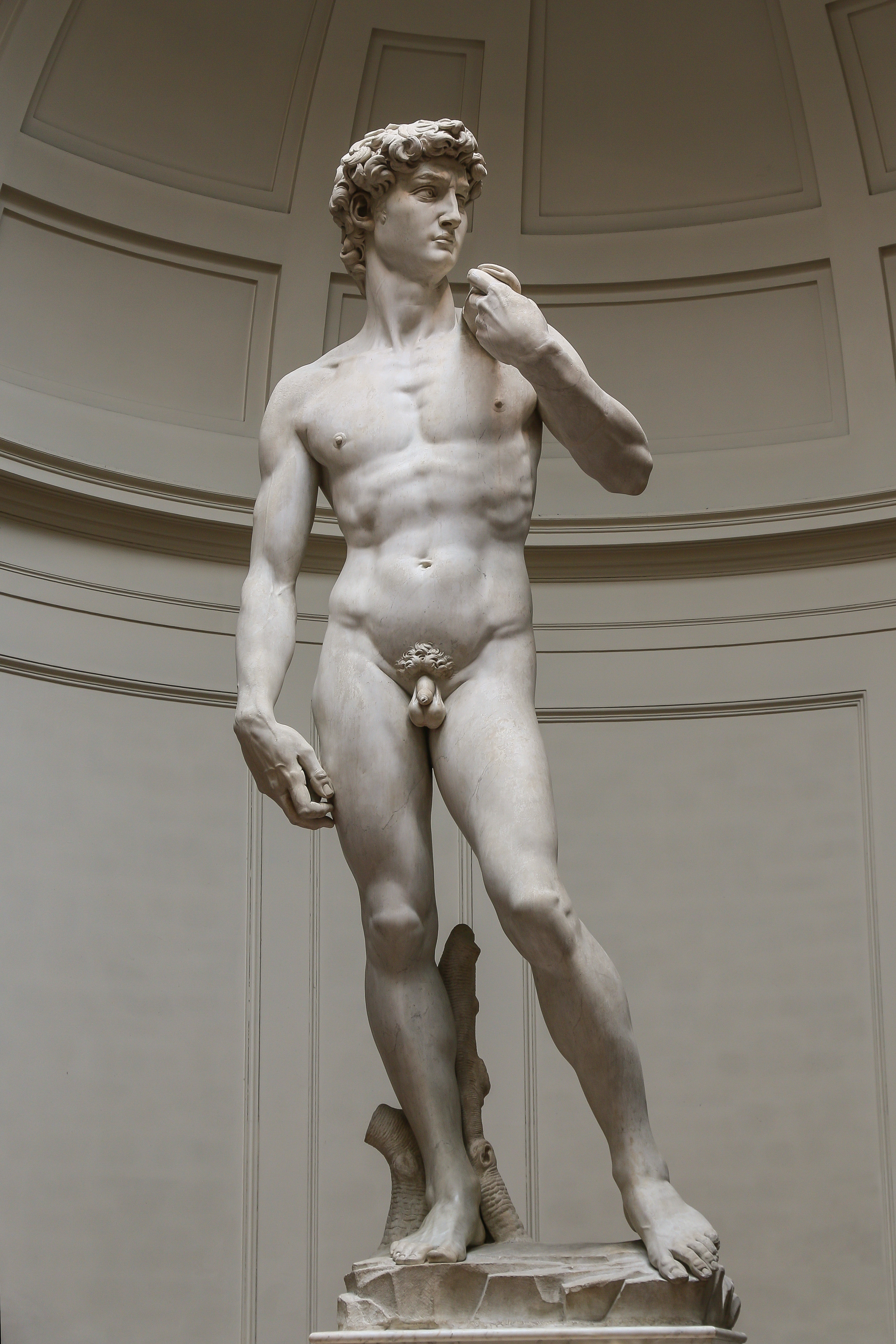
David (1504), by Michelangelo

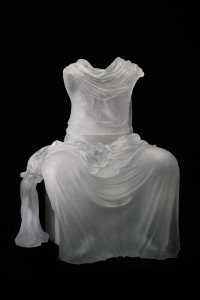
Seated Dress Impression with Drapery (2005), by Karen LaMonte

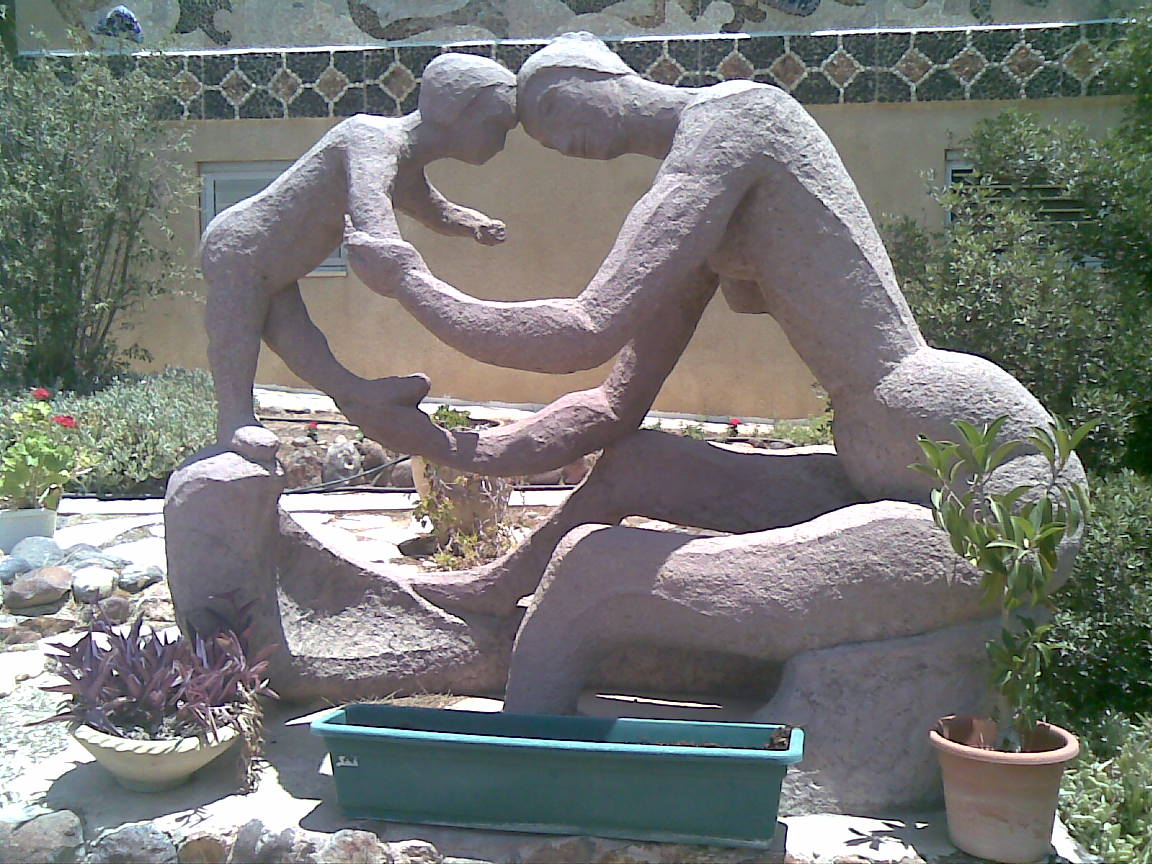
Mother and her child by Leah Michlson.

== Landscape, seascape ==
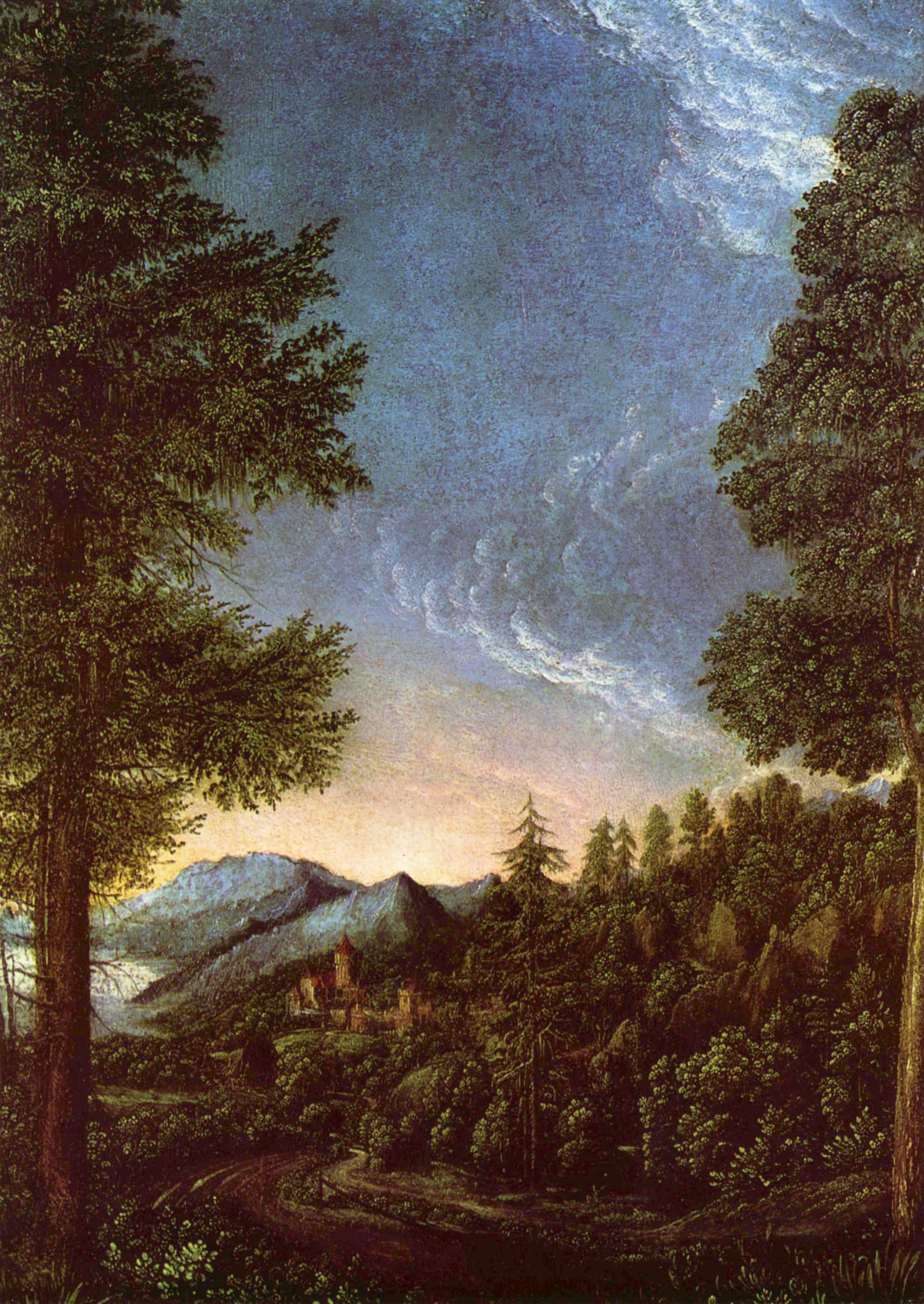
Albrecht Altdorfer (c. 1528), Danube landscape near Regensburg

Pieter Bruegel the Elder (1565) The Harvesters

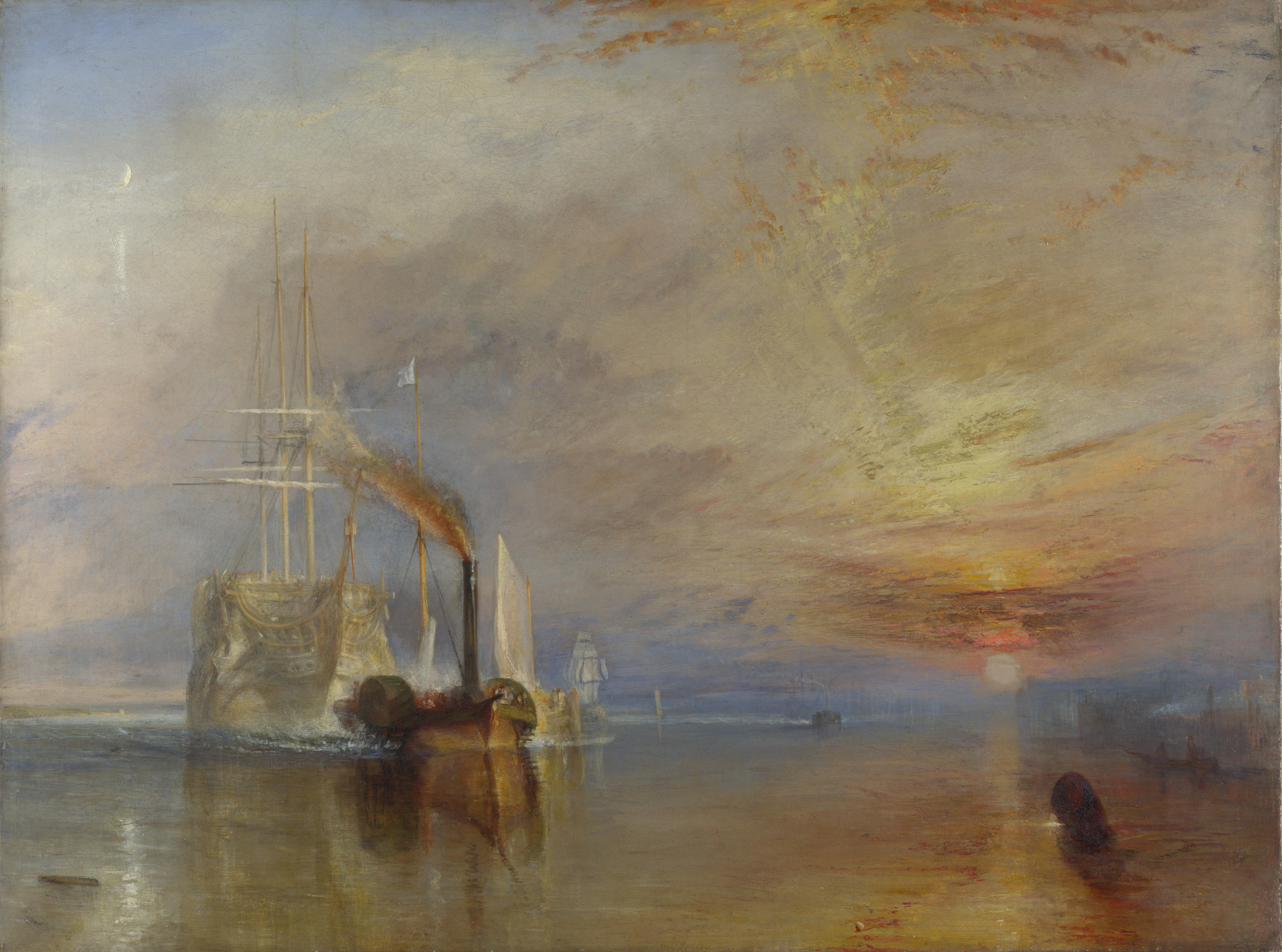
J. M. W. Turner (1839) The Fighting Temeraire

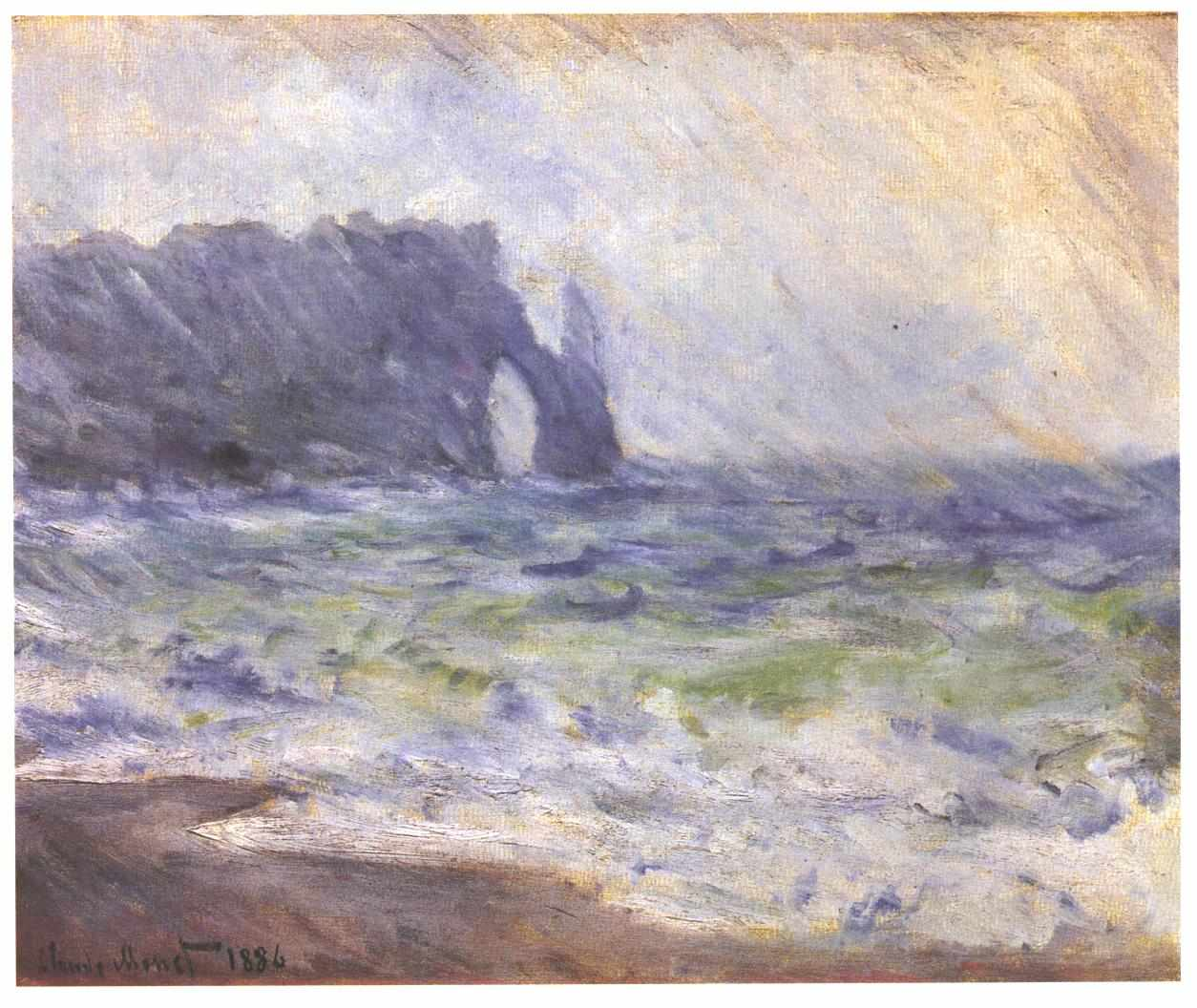
Claude Monet (1886) Rain at Eretat

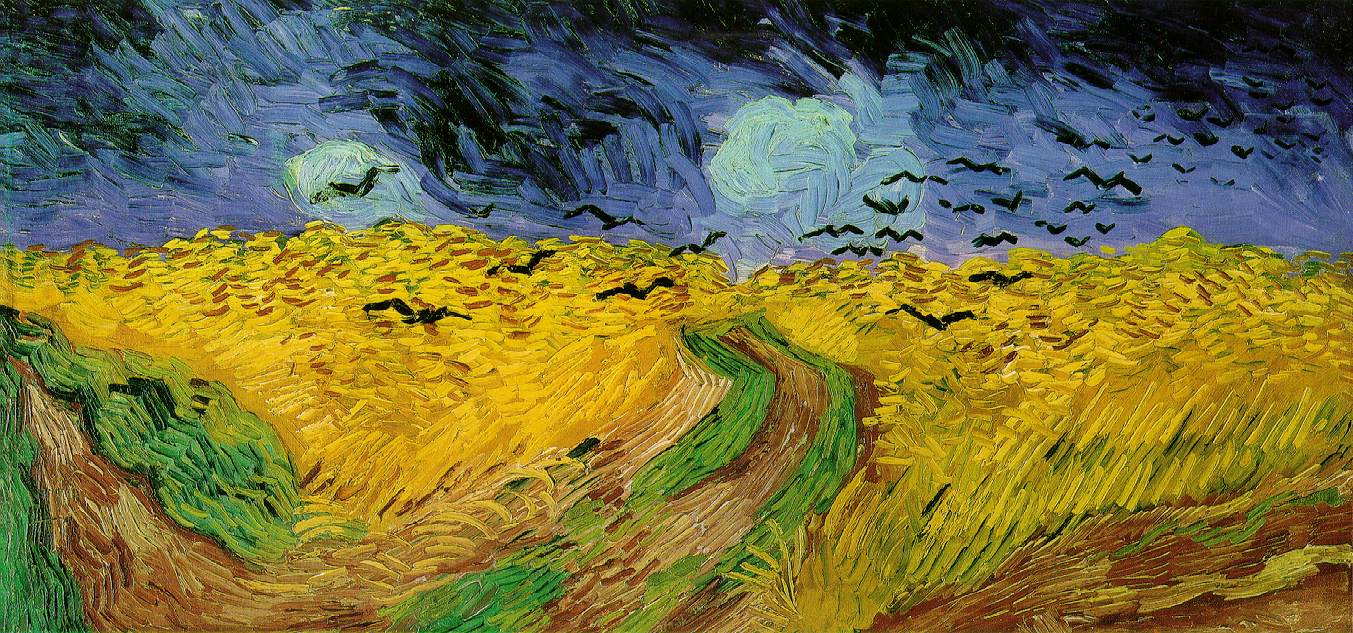
Wheat Field with Crows (1890) by Vincent van Gogh

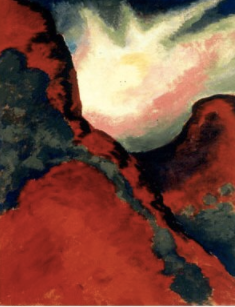
Palo Duro Canyon (1916) by Georgia O'Keeffe

== Still life ==
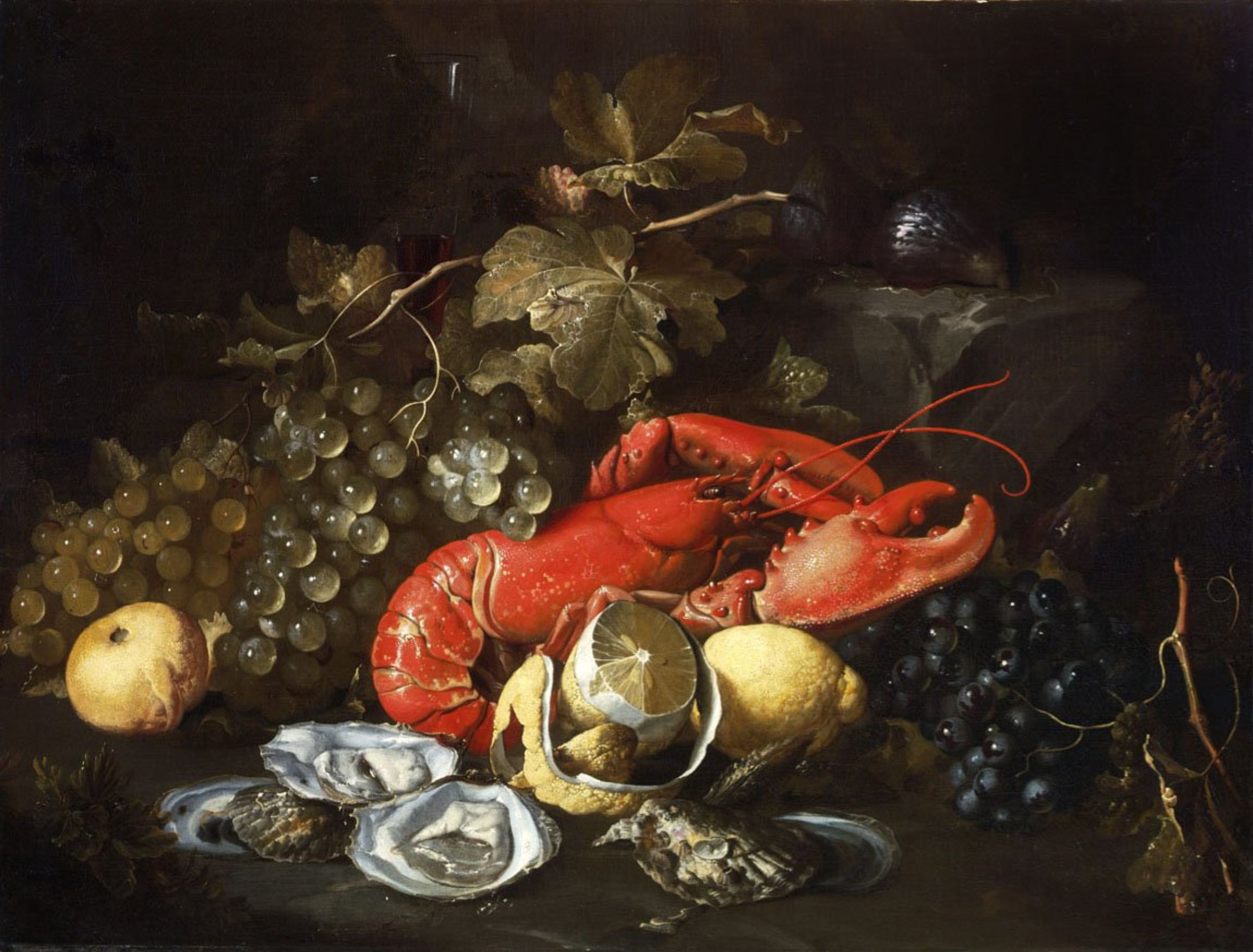
Alexander Coosemans (c. 1660) Still Life with Lobster and Oysters

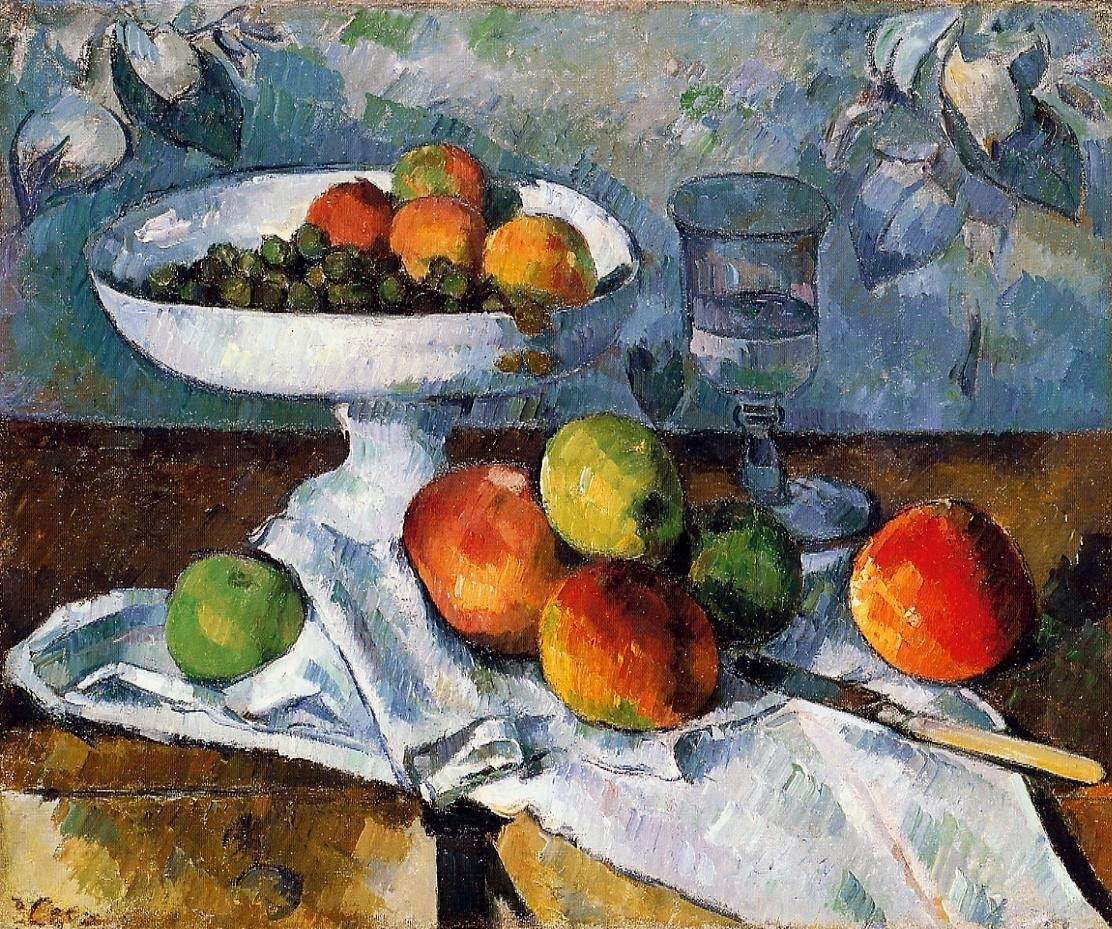
Paul Cézanne (1879) Nature morte au compotier

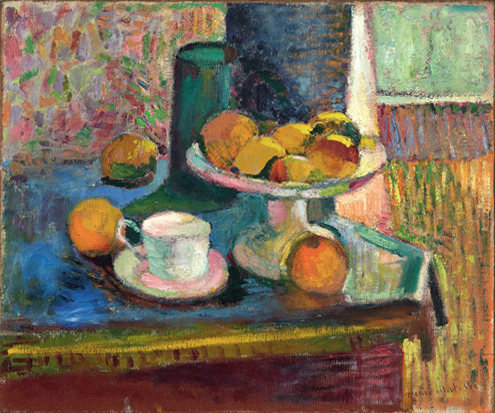
Henri Matisse (1899) Still Life with Compote, Apples and Oranges

== Cave painting ==
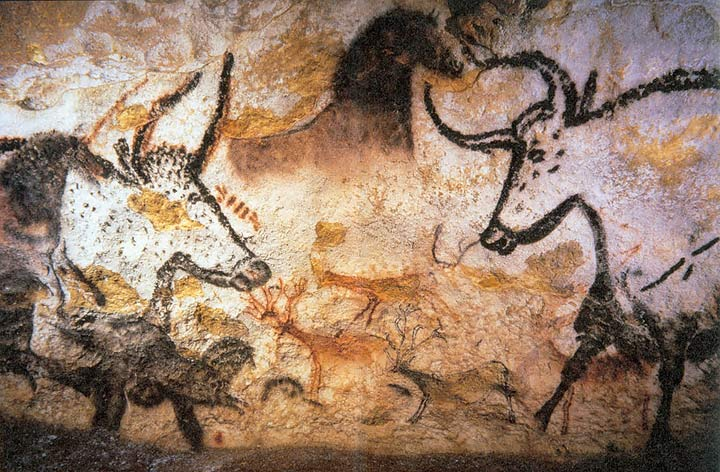
Upper Paleolithic art, c. 17,300 years old, showing aurochs, horses, and deer. Lascaux, France

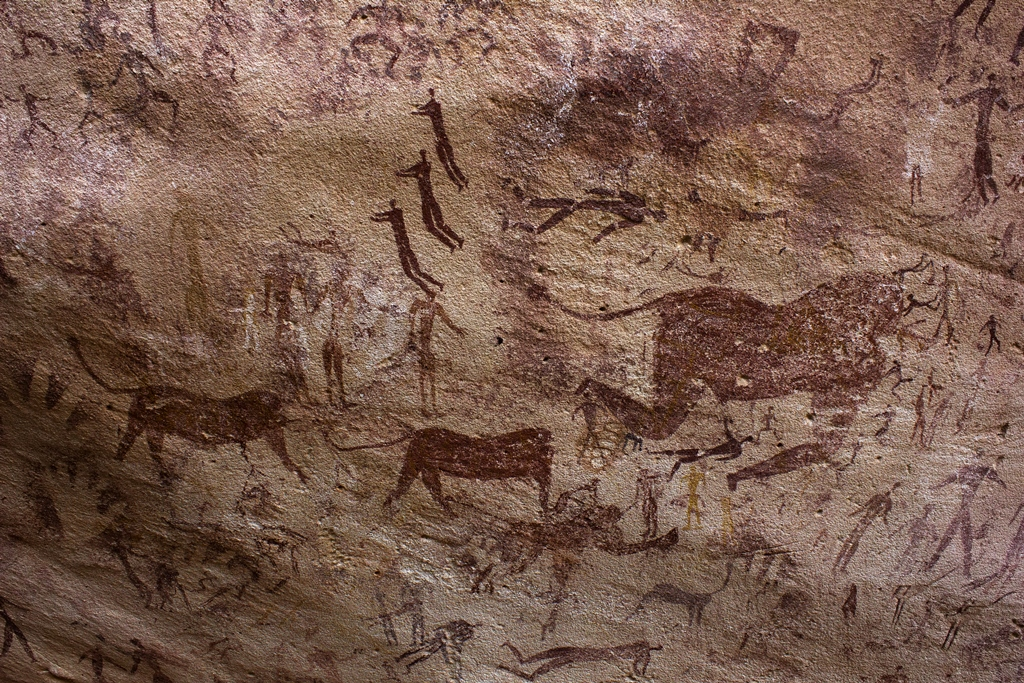
Neolithic rock art, over 7,000 years old. Cave of Beasts, Egypt

== See also ==
- Illustration
- Narrative art
- Neofigurative Art
- Stuckism
