= Deng Shi =

Chinese writer and antiques dealer (1877–1951)

- 鄧實
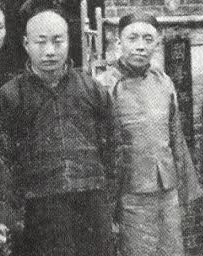
- Deng Shi (right) and Huang Jie in 1906
- Born: 1877; Gaochang, Shanghai, Qing China
- Died: 14 September 1951 (aged 73–74); Shanghai, People's Republic of China
- Occupations: Journalist, writer, antiques dealer
- Notable work: Zhengyi tongbao; Guocui xuebao; Cathay Art Book; Meishu congshu

Chinese name
- Traditional Chinese: 鄧實
- Simplified Chinese: 邓实
Transcriptions
Standard Mandarin
- Hanyu Pinyin: Dèng Shí
- Wade–Giles: Teng^{4} Shih^{2}

Courtesy name
- Chinese: 秋枚
Transcriptions
Standard Mandarin
- Hanyu Pinyin: Qiūméi
- Wade–Giles: Ch'iu1-mei2

Deng Shi (1877 – 14 September 1951) was a Chinese journalist, writer, and antiques dealer who advocated for guoxue ('national studies'). He was born in Shanghai to a family who had migrated from Shunde, Guangdong. He became greatly upset after the Qing dynasty's defeat in the Boxer Rebellion, and advocated for national reconstruction through his Shanghai publishing house Shenzhou guoguang she and its journal Zhengyi tongbao, founded in 1901. Seeking to revitalize and modernize traditional Chinese scholarship, Deng founded the Guoxue Preservation Society and published the Guocui xuebao periodical. He also published a fine arts journal, the Cathay Art Book, and co-edited a fine arts book series entitled Meishu congshu. Frequently ill and disillusioned by the Warlord Era and the New Culture Movement, Deng mainly worked as an antiques dealer from the 1920s onward, with his friend and co-editor Huang Binhong taking over his publishing house.

During the early 1900s, Deng advocated for both constitutional monarchy and republicanism to modernize China's political system. He advocated for the revival of pre-Imperial Chinese cultural practices, comparing this to the European Renaissance and equating the historical dominance of Confucianism to the dominance of the Catholic Church in medieval Europe. He saw the Confucian classics as historical works rather than works of sage wisdom, and advocated for "people's history" to supersede traditional "monarchical history".

== Biography ==
Little is known about Deng Shi's early life. He was born in Gaochang Township, Shanghai, as the eldest of two brothers in a Cantonese family. They had their roots in the township of Shuiteng in Shunde, Guangdong, before moving to Shanghai. His father was interested in foreign books, and had Deng hand-copy new books as a study technique. In 1896, Deng and his younger brother Deng Fang (鄧方) returned to Shuiteng to study under the Confucian scholar Jian Chaoliang (簡朝亮). Around 1900, he began to collect traditional art and artifacts such as paintings, calligraphy, bronze vessels, coins, and seals. Deng received the courtesy name Qiumei (秋枚), but was also known as Meizi (枚子) or Yecan (野残).

In 1901, Deng reported being overcome with grief after the Qing dynasty ended the Boxer Rebellion against the foreign great powers with the signing of the Boxer Protocol, one of the unequal treaties. That year, he founded a publishing house in the Shanghai International Settlement, naming it Shenzhou guoguang she ('Cathay Art Union'). Inspired by the 1873–1899 periodical Xiguo jinshi huibian, a compilation of translated Western news reports, he began the periodical Zhengyi tongbao (政藝通報, 'Bulletin of Politics and Arts') as the house's first publication. The journal, published twice a month, featured bulletins and news reports alongside technological and political analysis. Deng emphasized in the Zhengyi tongbao the need to connect China to the broader world and recover from its humiliation to European powers.

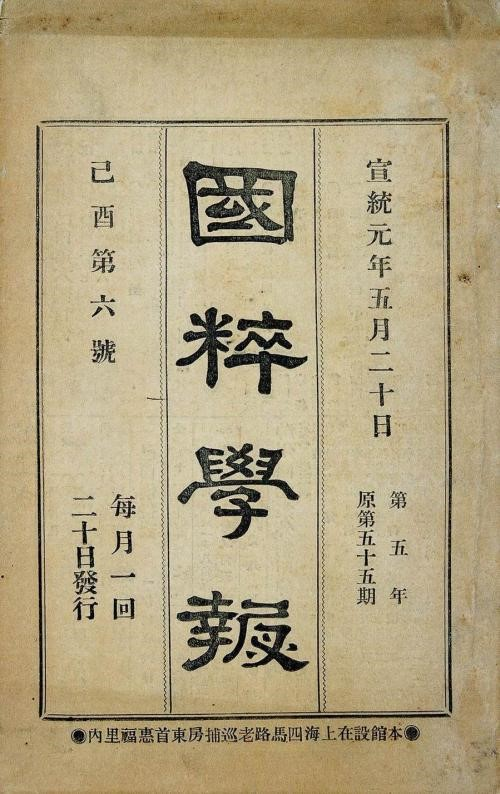
Cover of the May 1909 issue of the Guocui xuebao

The writers of the Zhengyi tongbao could not agree on a stance regarding the New Policies reforms, debating between republicanism and constitutional monarchy, and on what roles scholar-officials should take following the forthcoming abolition of the imperial examination system. Deng emphasized the development of 'national studies' (國學; guoxue), seeking to modernize Chinese thought while preserving elements of traditional scholarship. In 1904 or 1905, Deng and the scholar Huang Jie founded the National Studies Preservation Society (國學保存會; Guóxué bǎocúnhuì) at Shanghai. In 1905, Deng and Huang founded the journal Guocui xuebao ('National Essence Journal'). Deng aimed for the Guocui xuebao to provide a more coherent and unified set of content than the Zhengyi tongbao, as well as to more effectively participate in the debate around the new reforms. Through his manuscripts submitted to the journal, Deng met the art historian Huang Binhong, and the two became lifelong friends and colleagues. The Guocui xuebao continued publication until 1911.

The society was soon joined by a number of other prominent scholars, such as Liu Shipei, Liu Yazi, Ma Xulun, and Wang Guowei. The philologist Zhang Taiyan, imprisoned during the society's founding, wrote frequently for the group. Deng and his fellow society members made plans to open a School of National Essence (國粹學堂; Guocui xuetang) in 1907, which would combine traditional Chinese learning with modern western education; this plan was later abandoned. Deng began publishing another periodical on behalf of the Guoxue Preservation Society in 1908, the Cathay Art Book (神州國光集; Shenzhou Guoguang ji). This became one of the most prominent Chinese art journals of the period. The journal was retitled Shenzhou daguan (神州大觀, 'Panorama of the Divine Land') in 1912, but continued publishing until 1922. He launched a series of art books entitled Meishu congshu (美術叢書, Collection of Books on Fine Arts') in early 1911, taking an approach closer to European fine arts books than traditional Chinese coverage.

The 1911 Revolution saw the collapse of the Qing dynasty and the founding of the Republic of China. Many revolutionaries were not prepared for the unplanned revolution, and over the course of the 1910s, China entered the Warlord Era as political power shifted towards coalitions of warlords. This sidelined and alienated many scholars and intellectuals, who often withdrew from politics. Deng and Huang reunited in 1918 for the first time since the revolution, leading the latter to write a melancholy poem on how both had become disillusioned from politics. Deng published several compilations of rare books and manuscripts under the name Fengyulou (風雨樓, 'Wind and Rain House'), used on many of his personal seals.

Around the 1920s, Deng had largely ceased to write and worked as an antique dealer, withdrawing from contemporary cultural and political matters due to ailing health and disillusionment with the revolt against traditional culture in the New Culture Movement. He spent his later years living in Shanghai. Huang Binhong took over his publishing house and art publications. Deng continued to co-edit the Meishu congshu with Huang until the series ceased publication in 1947. After another serious period of illness, Deng died in Shanghai on 14 September 1951.

== Views ==
Describing the 1900 foreign occupation of Beijing as an example of how China risked being destroyed, Deng predicted in the early 1900s that the 20th century would be an age of "nationalist imperialism", with the competition between great powers growing to encompass all aspects of daily life. In the Zhengyi tongbao, he called on his readers to expel the foreign invaders, imagining a China which dominated the Pacific Ocean and revived the militarism of the Mongol Yuan dynasty. During the first years of the 1900s, he advocated for constitutional monarchy as the next stage of political development for China, but supported republicanism as an ideal.

Deng was strongly influenced by the 1904 Chinese translation of British writer Edward Jenks's A History of Politics, which described human society evolving through three stages; tribalism, feudalism, and nation-states, a purportedly linear progression governed by the "law of social evolution". He equated the 20th century revival of ancient Chinese cultural practices to the European Renaissance, writing in 1905 that "Just as Europeans underwent their rebirth of ancient studies in the fifteenth century, the Chinese experienced their rebirth of ancient studies in the twentieth century." Calling on Chinese to recover their ancient heritage, he compared the Qin dynasty's "burning of books and burying of scholars" to the purported destruction of Roman libraries by the Arabs, and compared the dominance of Confucianism which begun in the Han dynasty to the power of the Catholic Church during the Medieval period.

Deng described guoxue as in opposition to junxue (君學; 'learning for the emperor'), arguing that due to the absolute status of the emperor over scholars, China had no independent school of "national learning". Following the mid-Qing scholar Zhang Xuecheng and Zhang Taiyan, Deng argued that the Confucian classics were to be interpreted as historical texts rather than works of sagely wisdom, and argued that Qing scholarship had failed to advance beyond these works.

Unlike the reformist scholar and activist Liang Qichao, Deng did not flatly deny the history of ancient China (the pre-imperial period), describing ancient historical records as "divine history" made for religious purposes. He considered these useful as a historical source, and theorized that through the recording of cataclysms and bad omens, the compilers could frighten rulers into restraining their actions. He believed that this divine history was superseded by monarchical history, focused on the history of the state and monarchs, which dominated historiography across the world until the 19th century. Then, he wrote that "people's history" (民史; minshi) began to emerge, encompassing society as a whole. Deng believed that the 20th century would see the end of monarchical history, and advocated for people's history in various journal articles.
