= Cheng Zhengkui =

Chinese painter and poet

Chéng Zhèngkuí (Ch'eng Cheng-k'ui, traditional: 程正揆, simplified: 程正揆); ca. 1604-1670 was a Chinese landscape painter and poet during the Qing Dynasty (1644–1912).

Cheng was born in Xiaogan in the Hubei province. His style name was 'Ruibo' and his sobriquets were 'Jiuling and Qingxi daoren'. Cheng was taught by Dong Qichang and collaborated with Kun Can. His landscapes were painted using the side of the dry brush, in a pure and profound style. In poetry he produced the work Qing Xi Left Script.
