= Kun Can =

Chinese painter

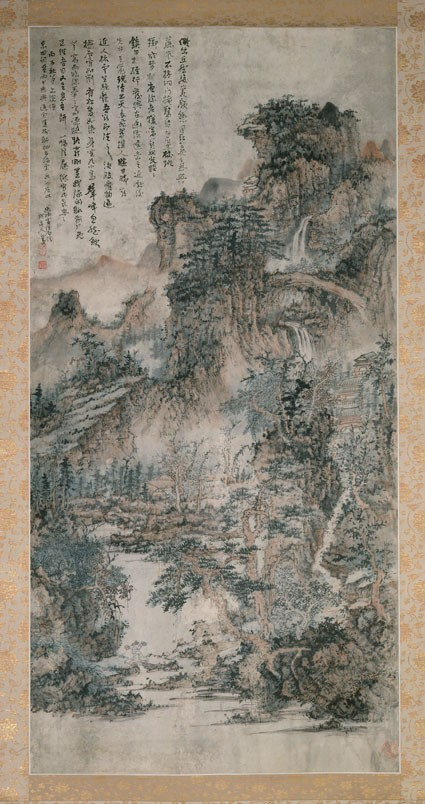
Landscape with waterfalls and trees, 1636. Ashmolean Museum, Oxford

Kun Can (髡殘, Buddhist name; common name: 劉石谿 (Liu Shixi or Liu Jieqiu)) (1612 to after 1674) was a Chinese Buddhist monk and painter during Ming and Qing dynasties. He hailed from Hunan, but spent most of his life in Nanjing. He became a Chan Buddhist monk at an early age and in Nanjing was abbot of a monastery on Niushou Shan. His style of landscape painting was influenced by Wang Meng and he is one of the Four Monk Masters in the early Qing Dynasty. The others being Zhu Da, Hong Ren, and Shitao. As he was also known as Shi Xi he was at times said to be one of the "Two Shi". Few of Kun Can's works survive.

Unlike some of the other Monk Masters he seems to have become a monk well before the fall of the Ming dynasty. In personality he was noted for being frank and straightforward.

== Sources ==
- Chinese Paintings in the Ashmolean Museum Oxford (82-83) Oxford ISBN 1-85444-132-9
- See China
- China-on-site
