= Johann Anton Eismann =

Austrian painter

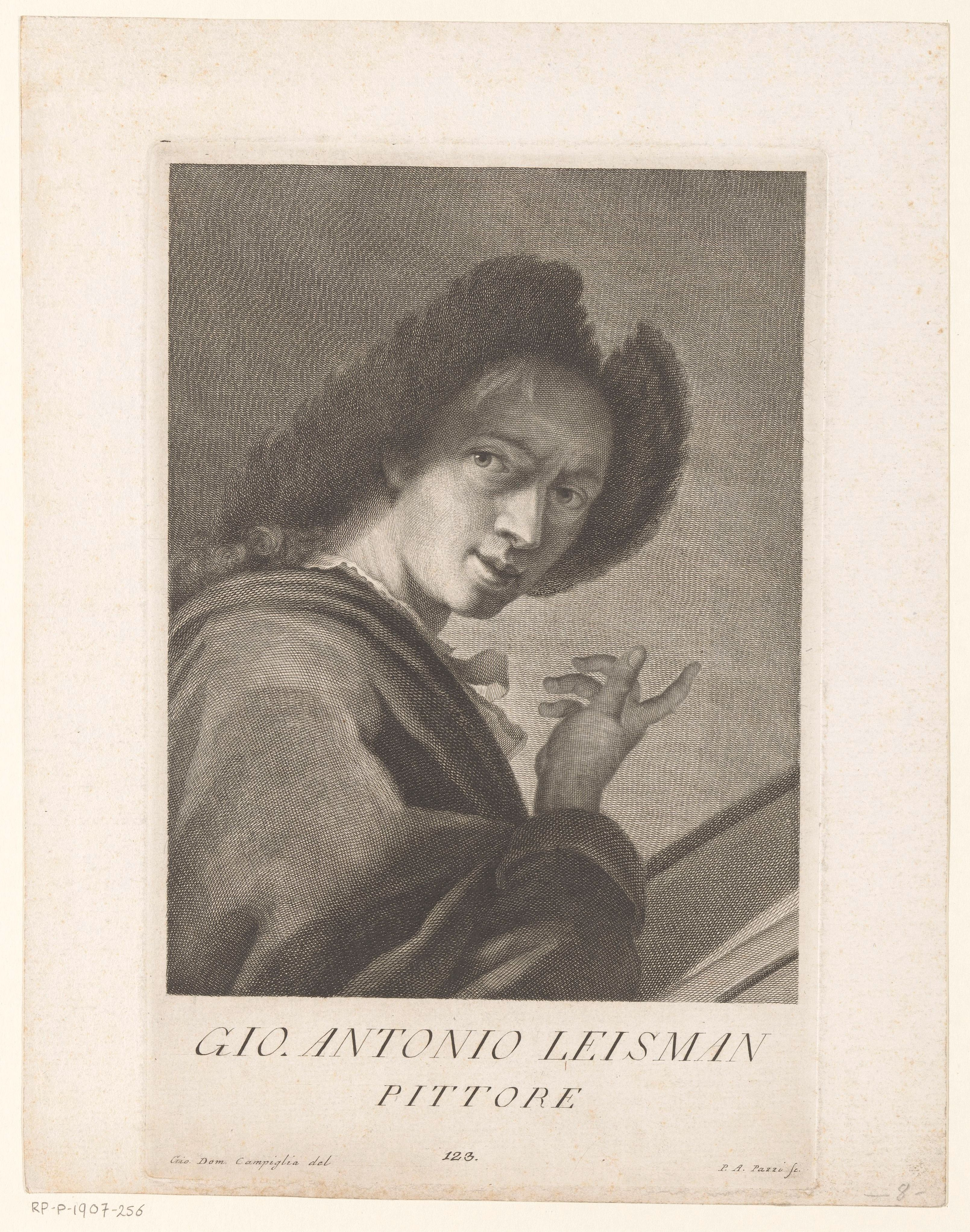
- Portrait of artist Johann Anton Eismann
- Born: 1604; Salzburg, Austria
- Died: 1698 (aged 93–94); Venice, Italy
- Occupation: Painter
- Known for: Harbor and battle genre scenes

Johann Anton Eismann (1604–1698) was a painter from the Prince-Archbishopric of Salzburg in the Holy Roman Empire who worked mainly in the Republic of Venice.

Eismann was born in Salzburg, and was active in Verona and Venice. He painted primarily harbor and some battle genre scenes. He died in Venice in 1698.

== Work ==
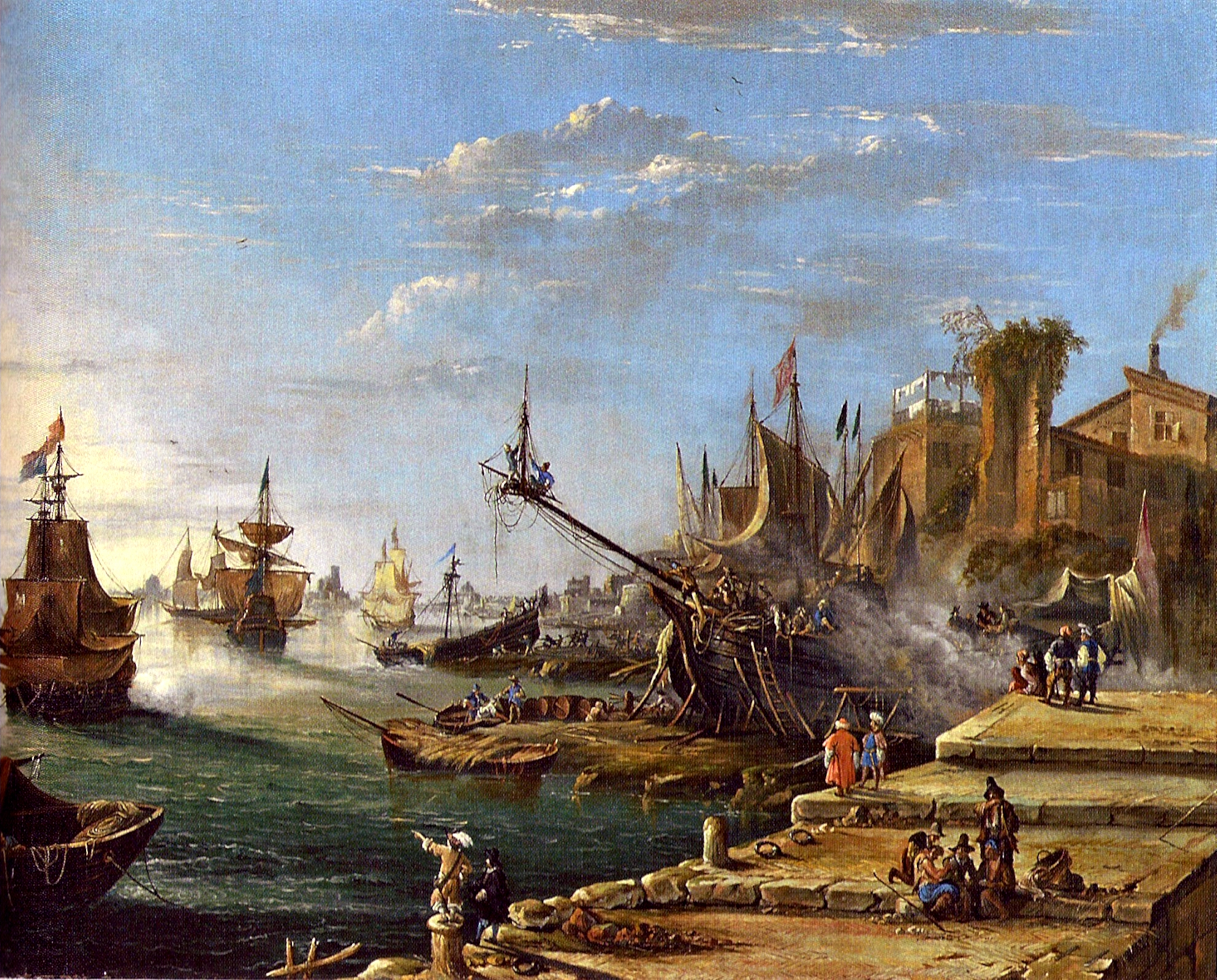
A Sea Port

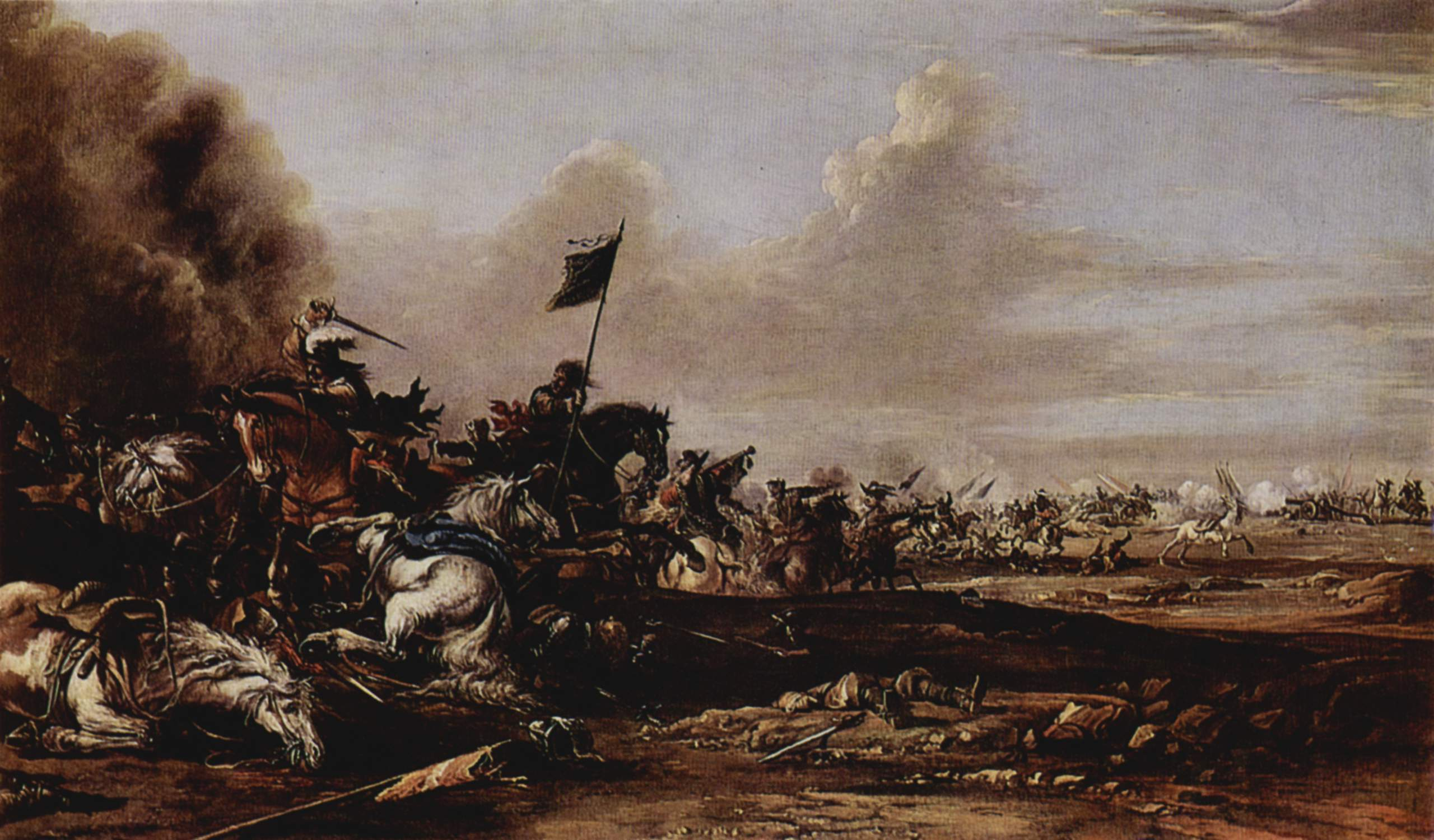
The Battle, Hermitage Museum
