= Hong Ren =

Chinese Buddhist monk and painter

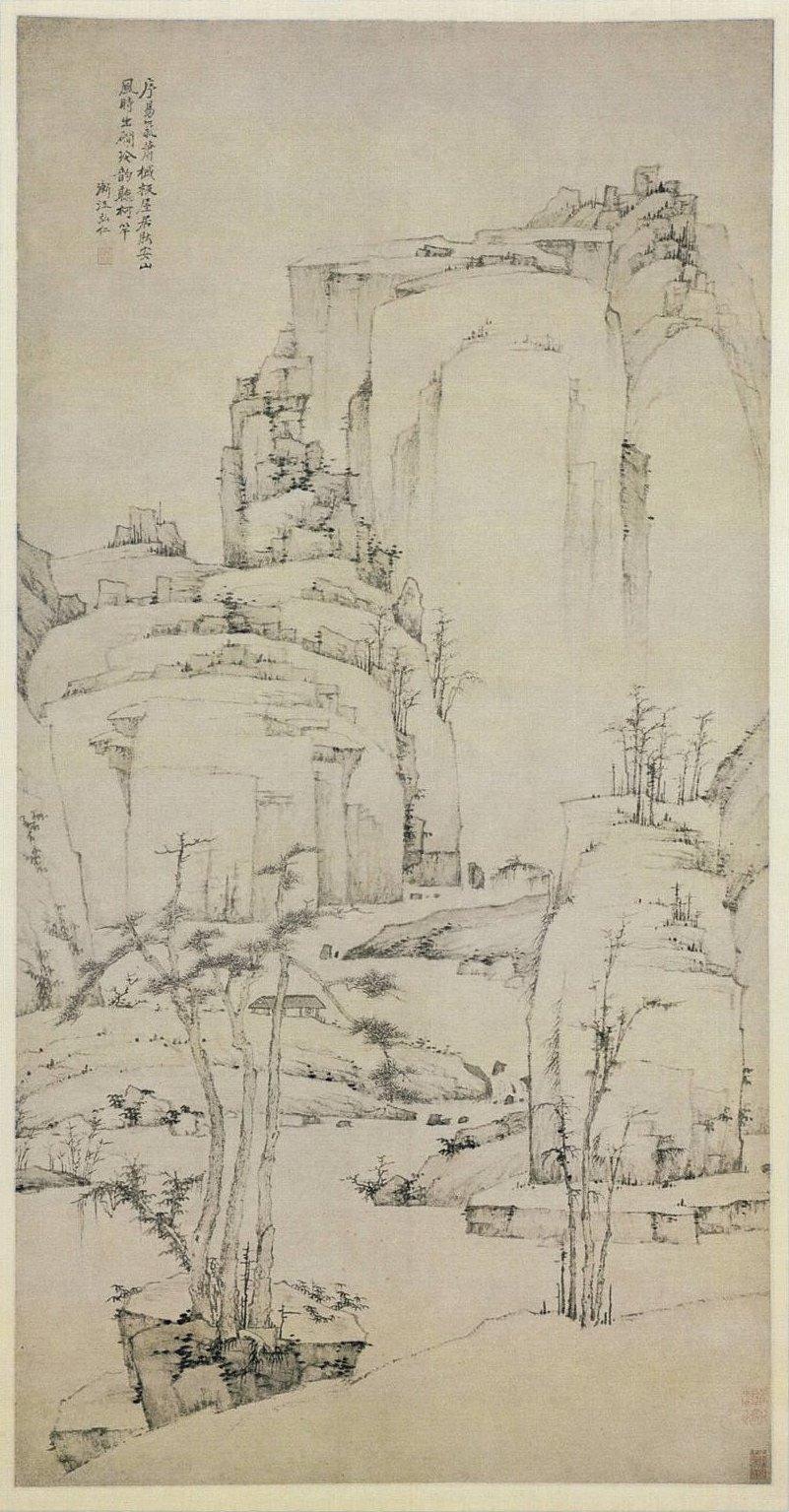
The Coming of Autumn, ink on paper by Hongren (Hong Ren), 1658–61, Honolulu Museum of Art

Hong Ren, who is also known as Hongren, (Chinese: 弘仁; born 1610, Xixian, Anhui province, China—died 1663) was a Chinese Buddhist monk and painter of the early Qing dynasty and a member of the Anhui (or Xin'an) school of painting. His birth name was Jiang Fang. After the fall of the Ming dynasty and the death of his mother, he became a monk, as did his artistic contemporaries, Zhu Da, Shitao, and Kun Can. They protested the fall of the Ming dynasty by becoming monks.

== Painting ==
Although he is regarded to have begun painting to help support his family at an early age, his more famous works were created in his later years. His paintings can be seen to exhibit an intense portrayal of the characteristics presented in the works of Ni Zan; a Yuan Dynasty master.

Hong Ren's style has been said to "[represent] the world in a dematerialized, cleansed version ... revealing his personal peace through the liberating form of geometric abstraction."
