= 1751 in art =

Events from the year 1751 in art.

== Events ==
- September 13 – The Kalvária Banská Štiavnica in the Kingdom of Hungary is completed
- Edme-François Gersaint's Catalogue raisonné de toutes les piėces qui forment l'oeuvre de Rembrandt, the first catalogue raisonné of a single artist's graphic work, is published posthumously in Paris
- Charles-Joseph Natoire is appointed director of the French Academy in Rome
- Giovanni Paolo Pannini restarts work on the Trevi Fountain after the death of Nicola Salvi

== Works ==
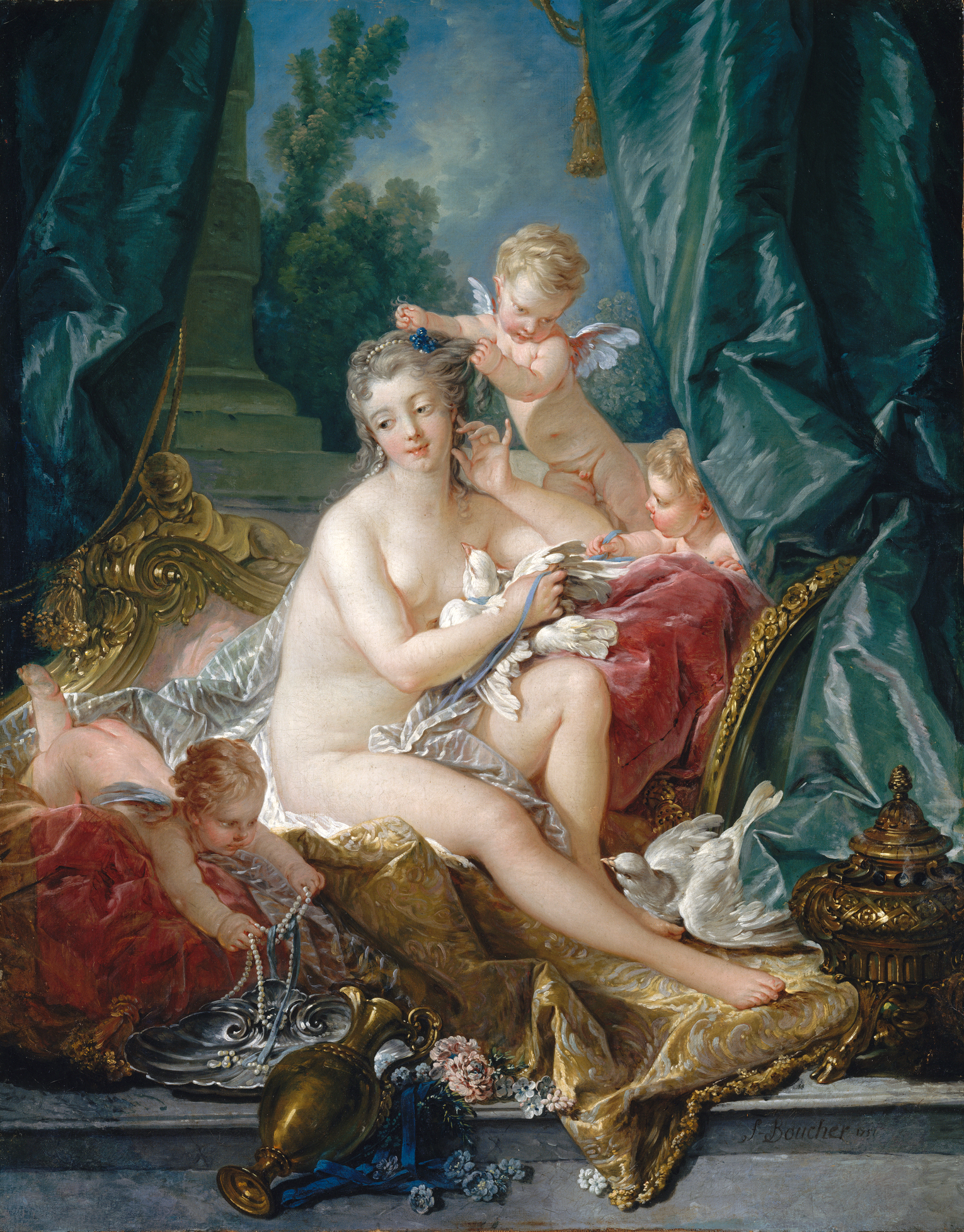
François Boucher, The Toilet of Venus

- François Boucher – Toilette of Venus
- Canaletto
  - The Grand Walk, Vauxhall Gardens
  - London: The Thames from Somerset House Terrace towards the City and London: The Thames from Somerset House Terrace towards Westminster (pair, c. 1750–51)
- Maurice Quentin de La Tour – Self-portrait (pastels)
- William Hoare – Portrait of Henry Pelham
- William Hogarth engraves the prints Gin Lane, Beer Street and The Four Stages of Cruelty
- Pietro Longhi – The Rhinoceros
- Andrea Soldi – Louis-François Roubiliac
- Charles-André Vanloo paints portraits
- Claude-Joseph Vernet – A River with Fishermen

== Births ==
- January 7 – François Dumont, French painter of portrait miniatures (died 1831)
- January 31 – Jean François Carteaux, French painter and army commander (died 1813)
- February 18 – Adolf Ulrik Wertmüller, Swedish painter (died 1811)
- April 1 – Joseph Lange, Austrian actor and amateur painter (died 1831)
- May 11 – Ralph Earl, American Loyalist painter (died 1801)
- May 25 (bapt.) – John Raphael Smith, English painter and mezzotint engraver (died 1812)
- June 5 – Georg Haas, Danish engraver (died 1817)
- July 4
  - Giuseppe Ceracchi, Italian-born portrait sculpture and republican (guillotined 1801)
  - Heneage Finch, 4th Earl of Aylesford, British peer, politician and artist (died 1812)
- August 2 – Nicolas-Marie Gatteaux, French medal engraver (died 1832)
- September 13 – Hendrik Kobell, Dutch landscape and marine painter, etcher, draftsman and watercolorist (died 1799)
- October 6 – John Webber, English landscape artist (died 1793)
- December 8 – Heinrich Füger, German portrait and historical painter (died 1818)
- December 20 – Daniël Dupré, Dutch engraver, painter, draftsman, and watercolorist (died 1817)
- December 31 – Johann Baptist von Lampi the Elder, Austrian historical and portrait painter (died 1830)
- date unknown
  - George Brookshaw, English painter and illustrator (died 1823)
  - William Hamilton, English painter (died 1801)
  - Anna Maria Mengs, German portrait painter in pastel and miniature (died 1792)
  - Thomas Sheraton, English furniture designer (died 1806)
  - John Keyse Sherwin, English engraver and painter (died 1790)
  - Henry Tresham, Irish-born painter of large-scale history paintings (died 1814)

== Deaths ==
- January 6 - Carl Marcus Tuscher, German-born Danish polymath, portrait painter, printmaker, architect, and decorator (born 1705)
- January 29 – Jacob van Schuppen, Austrian painter (born 1670)
- March 8 – Jan František Händl, Czech Roman Catholic priest and baroque painter (born 1691)
- August 1 – Helena Arnell, one of the first Finnish painters and few female artists (born 1697)
- September 21 – Annibale Albani, Italian Cardinal and art collector (born 1682)
- date unknown
  - Francesco Andreini, Italian painter (born 1697)
  - Jean Charles Flipart, French engraver (born 1682)
  - Giovanni Domenico Lombardi, Italian painter in Lucca (born 1682)
  - Michele Rocca, Italian painter who practised in Rome (born 1671)
