= 1697 in art =

Events from the year 1697 in art.

== Events ==
- December 13 – Tsar Peter the Great of Russia visits Dutch Republic official Jacob de Wilde in Amsterdam to view his art collection, "the beginning of the West European classical tradition in Russia"; a view of the meeting is engraved by Jacob's daughter Maria de Wilde.

== Paintings ==
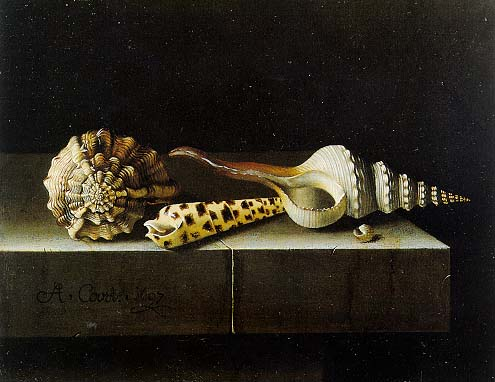
Coorte – Still Life with Shells, private collection

- Giovan Battista Caniana – The Crucifixion (Church of Santa Maria and San Giacomo, Romano di Lombardia)
- Adriaen Coorte – Still Life with Shells
- Carlo Maratta – The Baptism of Jesus
- Hyacinthe Rigaud – Portrait of Cardinal Louis Antoine de Noailles
- Hyacinthe Rigaud and Joseph Parrocel – Portrait of Louis, Grand Dauphin
- Painting of Christian V presiding over the Supreme Court of Denmark

== Births ==
- March 30 – Jan Baptist Xavery, Flemish sculptor active in the Netherlands (died 1742)
- April 12 – Anton Pichler, Tyrolean goldsmith and artist of engraved gems (died 1779)
- June 22 – Pierre-Imbert Drevet, French portrait engraver (died 1739)
- June 25 – Peter van Bleeck, portrait painter and engraver (died 1764)
- October 28
  - Giovanni Antonio Canal, better known as Canaletto, Venetian artist famous for his landscapes, or vedute, of Venice (died 1768)
  - Johann Gottfried Auerbach, Austrian painter (died 1753)
- November 10 – William Hogarth, English engraver and painter credited with pioneering western sequential art (died 1764)
- date unknown
  - Bernard Accama or Bernardus, Dutch historical and portrait painter, born in Friesland (died 1756)
  - Francesco Andreini, Italian painter (died 1751)
  - Helena Arnell, one of the first Finnish painters and few female artists (died 1751)
  - Claude François Devosge, French sculptor and architect (died 1777)
  - Johann Christian Fiedler, German portrait painter (died 1765)
  - Antonio Gionima, Italian painter (died 1732)
  - Michele Pagano, Italian painter of landscapes or vedutista (died 1732)
  - Giovanni Battista Tagliasacchi, Italian painter of historical scenes and portraits (died 1737)
  - Cornelis Troost – Dutch painter from Amsterdam (died 1750)

== Deaths ==
- April 4
  - Jan de Bray, Dutch painter (born 1627)
  - Andrea Carlone, Italian painter (born 1626)
- June 11 – Abraham Begeyn, Dutch painter of landscapes and cattle (born 1637)
- December 31 – Lucas Faydherbe, Dutch sculptor and architect (born 1617)
- date unknown
  - Ludovico Gimignani, Italian painter, active mainly in Rome (born 1643)
  - Muin Musavvir, Persian miniaturist during the Safavid period (born 1638)
  - Mei Qing, Chinese landscape painter, calligrapher, and poet during the Qing Dynasty (born 1623)
  - Claudine Bouzonnet-Stella, French engraver (born 1636)
  - Giulio Cesare Venenti, Italian painter of landscapes and engraver (born 1609)
