= Anne Macaulay =

Scottish musicologist (1924–1998)

- Born: 11 March 1924; Fife, Scotland
- Died: 1998 (aged 73–74)
- Education: University of Edinburgh
- Known for: Pythagorean mathematics, music and stone circles
- Scientific career
- Workplaces: University of Edinburgh

Anne Macaulay (11 March 1924 – 1998) was a Scottish musicologist, author and lecturer.

== Biography ==
Macaulay was born in Aithernie, Fife in Scotland near Lundin standing stones, the youngest child of Alison and Sir David Russell. Her family soon moved to Silverburn near Lundin Links where her father managed a paper-making business through the Great Depression and had interests in religion, archaeology, industry and a good sense of family values. She attended St Leonards School in St Andrews during the Second World War going on to briefly attend the University of Edinburgh which she departed for South Africa she learned how to fly an aeroplane. Around this time her brother, Patrick Russell died and she accompanied her father to Istanbul where he had funded an archaeological excavation. It was here that she met Bill Macaulay, curator of the Glasgow Museum of Art and an expert in mosaics and Byzantine art whom her father held in high esteem. In 1953, they married and moved to Johnsburn House in Balerno near the Pentland Hills. Together they had five children, the last in born in 1957. She developed an interest in classical guitar, which she learned to play to a high standard. This led to an interest in Pythagorean mathematics and its relationship with music. It was from this that her interest in stone circles and prehistoric geometry developed and she began to read the work of Alexander Thom. Over the next several years, she proceeded to resurvey much of Thom's work and travelled widely to Turkey, Malta, Egypt, Greece and throughout the British Isles in search of further evidence of his ideas.

After the break up of her marriage to Bill in 1971 she worked for 17 years trying to bring her work and the mass of data she had recorded into order. Her work became well known to other academics and musicians such as Professor Jay Kappraff, Keith Critchlow, Andrew Glazewski and Paul Segovia. She lectured at conferences and symposia in the United States and the UK and in 1994 was awarded an Honorary Fellowship by the University of Edinburgh. Macaulay's research interests included the origin of the alphabet, history of the guitar, the deity Apollo, and pythagorean mysteries. She was a trustee of the Salisbury Centre in Edinburgh and lectured for the Research into Lost Knowledge Organization (RILKO). She died early, in 1998, but her family said of her "She was fortunate to walk with many who knew the ancient ways, and she uncovered the truth as easily as drinking a cup of tea".

== Megalithic measures and rhythms ==
Macaulay's work was posthumously collated, edited and published in 2006 by Vivian T. Linacre, a Perth based surveyor who is president of the British Weights and Measures Association (an advocacy group for Imperial units and Richard A. Batchelor, an honorary Research Fellow at the University of St Andrews, geologist and investigator into the geometry of Fife. The book contains a critical re-assessment of the geometry used in over one hundred and eighty of the stone circles surveyed by Alexander Thom (who surveyed over two hundred) along with their mensuration using the megalithic yard and the megalithic rod. From Professor Fernie's 1981 studies of the Metrological Relief in the Ashmolean Museum, Oxford (which Macaulay gives by its previous name The Arundel Stone) she claimed a similarity between the Greek Fathom and the megalithic rod of 2.072 m. She also suggested that many of the megaliths had been designed using a "third yardstick" length of one Greek Foot, depicted on the Metrological relief at 0.296 m, or one seventh of a megalithic rod. Concerning this claim, Jay Kappraff wrote "However, according to the archaeological record, there was no standard unit of a 'foot' in ancient Greece." She found that the best direct evidence for the use of an ancient unit of measure in megalithic Britain at the fan of stone rows in Mid Clyth. Douglas Heggie had found this gave the strongest evidence for an early unit of measure of any site in the UK. Heggie was very dubious about the existence of the megalithic yard, stating that his careful analysis uncovered "little evidence for a highly accurate unit" and "little justification for the claim that a highly accurate unit was in use".

Macaulay suggested that a high culture of bards (or druids) emerged following an influx of Indo-European farming techniques into Britain in the fifth millennium BC. This culture were able to determine pythagorean mathematics from harmonious sounding triads played on ancient Lyres. These mathematics were then suggested to have been used in the construction of stone circles and exported back to Greece via the tin trade.
