= Megalithic yard =

Hypothetical ancient unit of measurement

The megalithic yard is a hypothetical ancient unit of length equal to about 2.72 feet (0.829 m). Some researchers believe it was used in the construction of megalithic structures. The proposal was made by Alexander Thom as a result of his surveys of 600 megalithic sites in England, Scotland, Wales and Brittany. Thom also proposed the megalithic rod of 2.5 megalithic yards, or on average across sites 6.77625 feet. As subunits of these, he further proposed the megalithic inch of 2.073 centimetres (0.816 in), 100 of which comprised a megalithic rod, and 40 of which comprised a megalithic yard. Thom applied the statistical lumped variance test of J.R. Broadbent on this quantum and found the results significant, while others have challenged his statistical analysis and suggest that Thom's evidence can be explained in other ways, for instance that the supposed megalithic yard is in fact the average length of a pace.

== Other units ==
Thom suggested that "There must have been a headquarters from which standard rods were sent out but whether this was in these islands or on the Continent the present investigation cannot determine."

Margaret Ponting has suggested that artefacts such as a marked bone found during excavations at Dail Mòr near Callanish, the Patrickholme bone bead from Lanarkshire and Dalgety bone bead from Fife in Scotland have shown some evidence of being measuring rods based on the megalithic yard in Britain. An oak rod from the Iron Age fortified settlement at Borre Fen measured 53.15 inches (135.0 cm) with marks dividing it up into eight parts of 6.64 inches (16.9 cm). Archaeologist Euan Mackie referred to five-eighths of this rod 33.2 inches (84 cm) as "very close to a megalithic yard". A measuring rod recovered from a Bronze Age burial mound in Borum Eshøj, East Jutland by P. V. Glob in 1875 measured 30.9 inches (78 cm). Keith Critchlow suggested this may have shrunk 0.63 inches (1.6 cm) from its original length of one megalithic yard over a period of 3000 years.

Thom made a comparison of his megalithic yard with the Spanish vara, the pre-metric measurement of Iberia, whose length was 2.7425 feet (0.8359 m). Mackie noticed similarities between the megalithic yard and a unit of measurement extrapolated from a long, marked shell from Mohenjo Daro and ancient measuring rods used in mining in the Austrian Tyrol. He suggested similarities with other measurements such as the ancient Indian gaz and the Sumerian šu-du3-a. Along with John Michell, Mackie also noted that it is the diagonal of a rectangle measuring 2 by 1 Egyptian remens. Jay Kappraff has noted similarity between the megalithic yard and the ancient Indus short yard of 33 inches (0.84 m). Anne Macaulay reported that the megalithic rod is equal in length to the Greek fathom of (2.072 metres (6.80 ft)) from studies by Eric Fernie of the Metrological Relief in the Ashmolean Museum, Oxford.

== Reception ==
Thom's proposals were initially ignored or regarded as unbelievable by mainstream archaeologists. Clive Ruggles, citing astronomer Douglas C. Heggie, has said that both classical and Bayesian statistical reassessments of Thom's data "reached the conclusion that the evidence in favour of the megalithic yard was at best marginal, and that even if it does exist the uncertainty in our knowledge of its value is of the order of centimetres, far greater than the 1mm precision claimed by Thom. In other words, the evidence presented by Thom could be adequately explained by, say, monuments being set out by pacing, with the 'unit' reflecting an average length of pace."

David George Kendall makes the same argument, and says that pacing would have created a greater difference in measurements between sites, and that a statistical analysis of sites would reveal whether they were measured by pacing or not. In an investigation for the Royal Academy, Kendall concluded that there was evidence of a uniform unit in Scottish circles but not in English circles, and that further research was needed. Statistician P. R. Freeman reached similar conclusions and found that two other units fit the data as well as the yard.

Douglas Heggie casts doubt on Thom's suggestion as well, stating that his careful analysis uncovered "little evidence for a highly accurate unit" and "little justification for the claim that a highly accurate unit was in use". In his book Rings of Stone: The Prehistoric Stone Circles of Britain and Ireland. Aubrey Burl calls the megalithic yard "a chimera, a grotesque statistical misconception." Most researchers have concluded that there is marginal evidence for a standardized measuring unit, but that it was not as uniform as Thom believed.

== Arguments for a geometric derivation ==
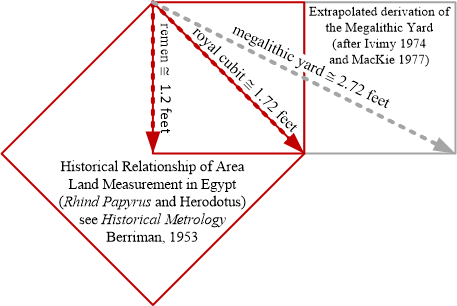
Explanation of how some have derived Thom's Megalithic Yard unit of measure from metrological land measure relationships established historically in Egypt's Dynastic periods

Some commentators upon Thom's megalithic yard (John Ivimy and then Mackie) have noted how such a measure could relate to geometrical ideas found historically in two Egyptian metrological units; the remen of about 1.2 feet and royal cubit of about 1.72 feet. The remen and royal cubit were used to define land areas in Egypt: "On documentary and other evidence Griffith came to the conclusion that the square on the royal cubit was intended to be twice that on the remen; and Petri identified the remen as a length of 20 digits".

A square with side length equal to the diagonal of a square with side length equal to one remen has an area of one square royal cubit, ten thousand (a myriad) of which defined an Egyptian land measure, the setat. John Ivimy noted "The ratio MY : Rc is SQRT(5) : SQRT(2) to the nearest millimeter, which makes the MY equal to SQRT(5) remens, or the length of a 2 × 1 remen rectangle." (see figure at right).

The main weakness in this argument is probably that, in order to derive their yard, the builders of the megalithic monuments would have needed the remen and royal cubit, upon which this geometrical relationship relies. However, since the megalithic constructs of the British Isles and northern France predate the pyramids by millennia, this supposed counter-argument is anachronistic.

Recent work by John Michell (Ancient Metrology, The Lost Science of Measuring the Earth), John Neal (All Done with Mirrors), Richard and Robin Heath (various works on British megalithic circles and on Carnac) make a case for the connection of the megalithic yard with a systemic relation of geodetics and the lunation cycle.

== See also ==
- Pseudoscientific metrology
