= 1609 in art =

Events from the year 1609 in art.

== Events ==
- January 9 – Letters patent issued relating to accommodation and workshops for artists in the Louvre Palace mezzanine in Paris.
- Hans Krumpper becomes chief sculptor to the Bavarian court under Maximilian I, Elector of Bavaria.
- Mesrop of Khizan paints a Gospel which ends up in the Bodleian Library, Oxford.

== Paintings ==
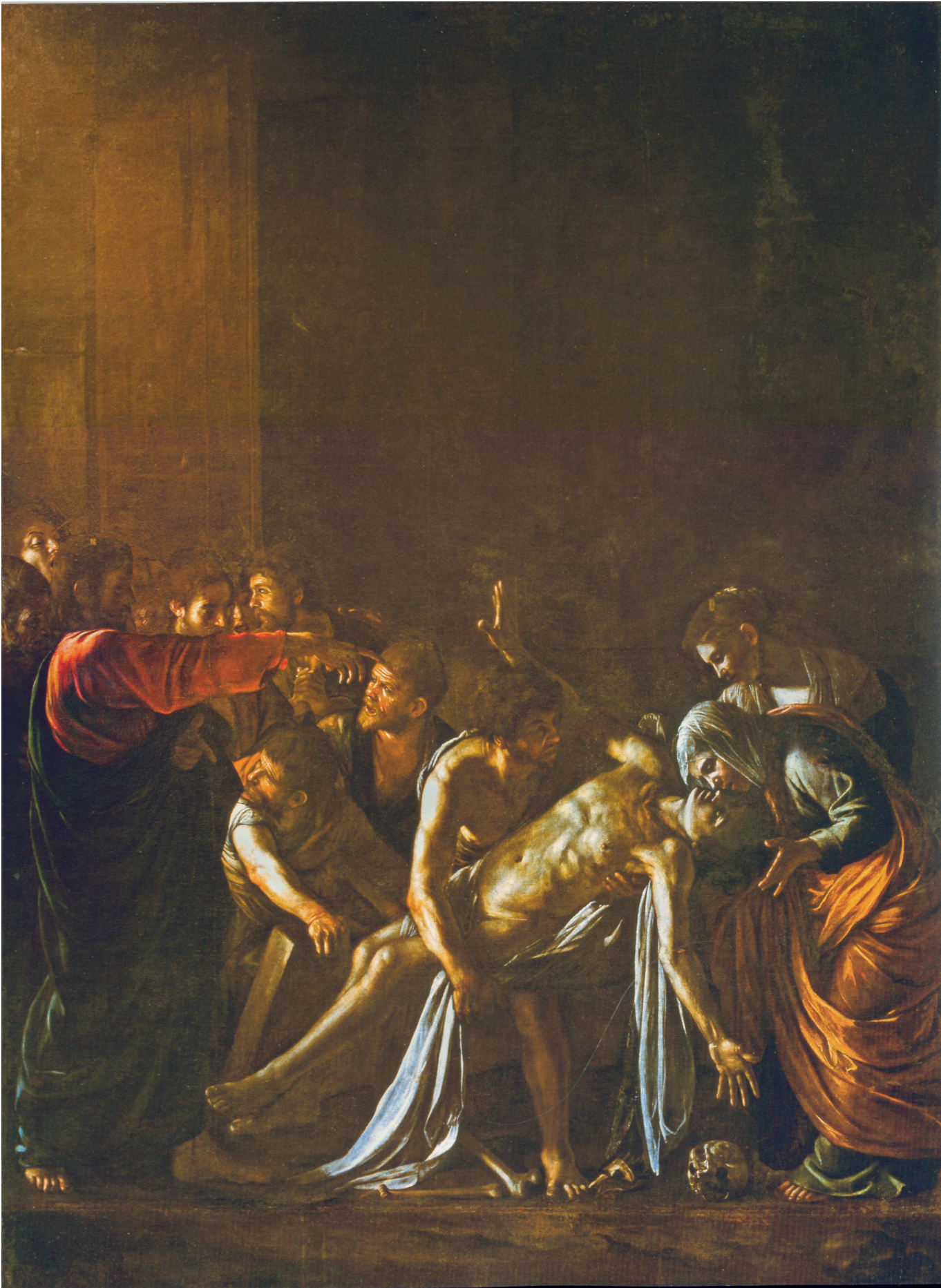
Caravaggio, The Raising of Lazarus

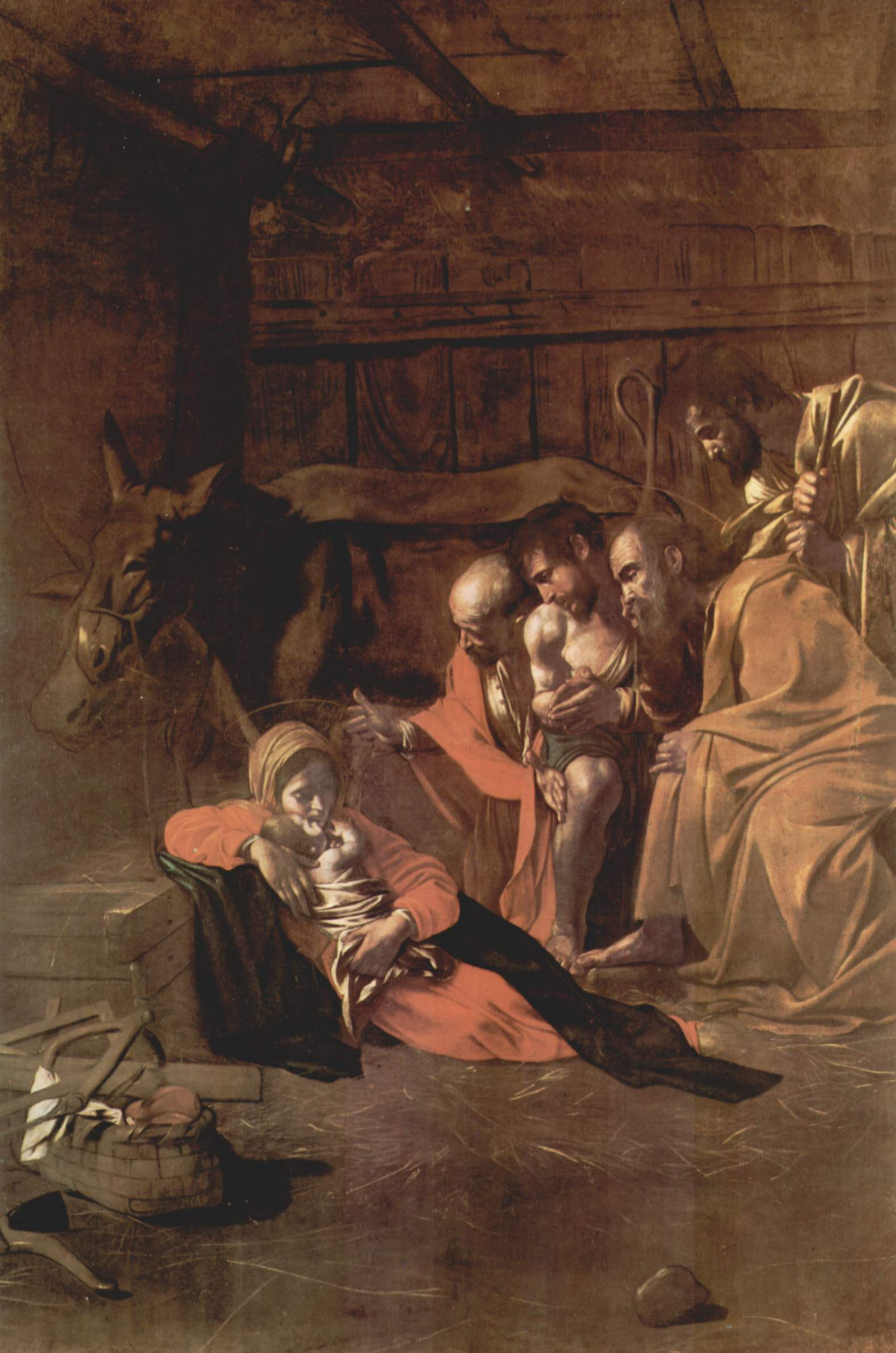
Caravaggio, Adoration of the Shepherds

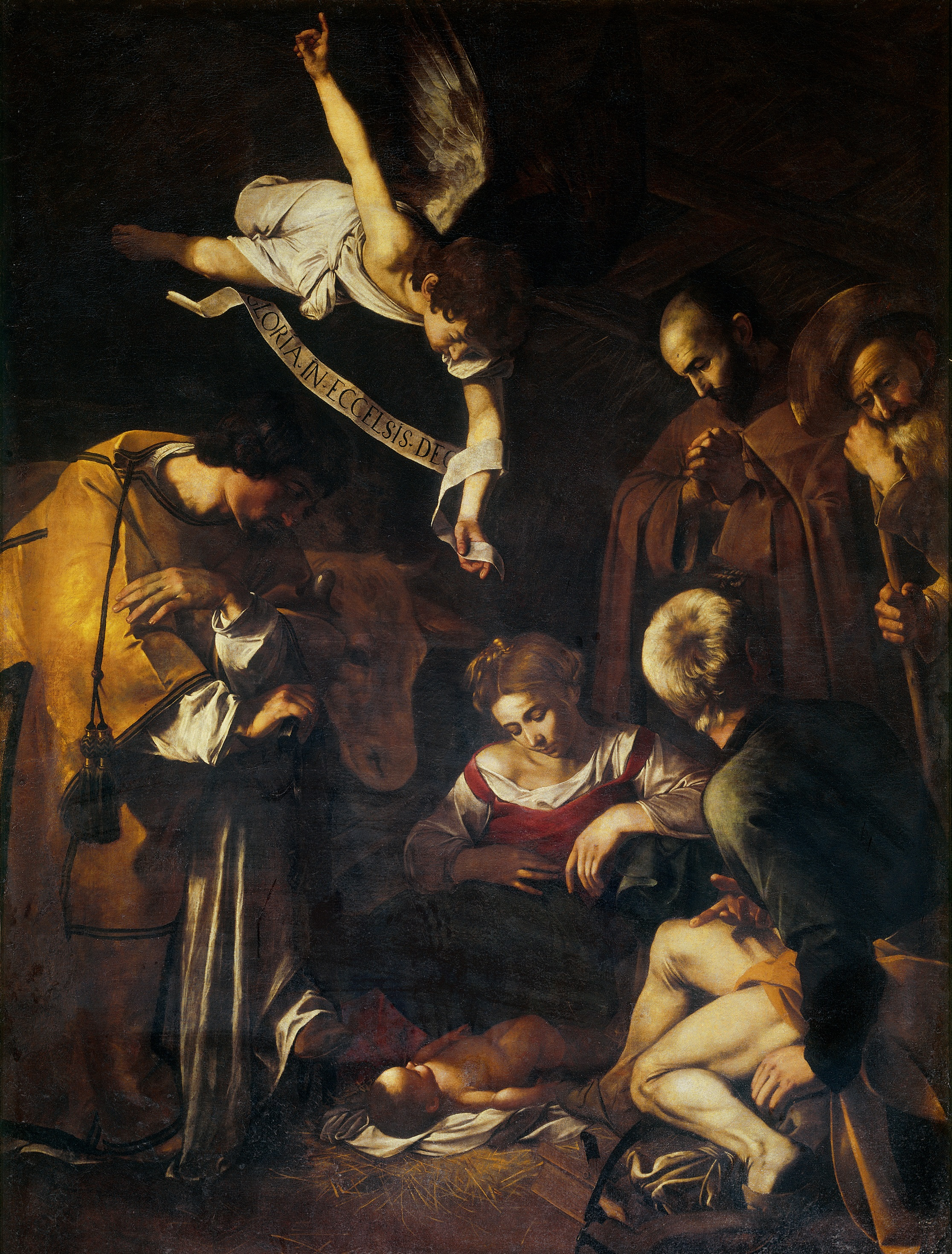
Caravaggio, Nativity with St. Francis and St. Lawrence

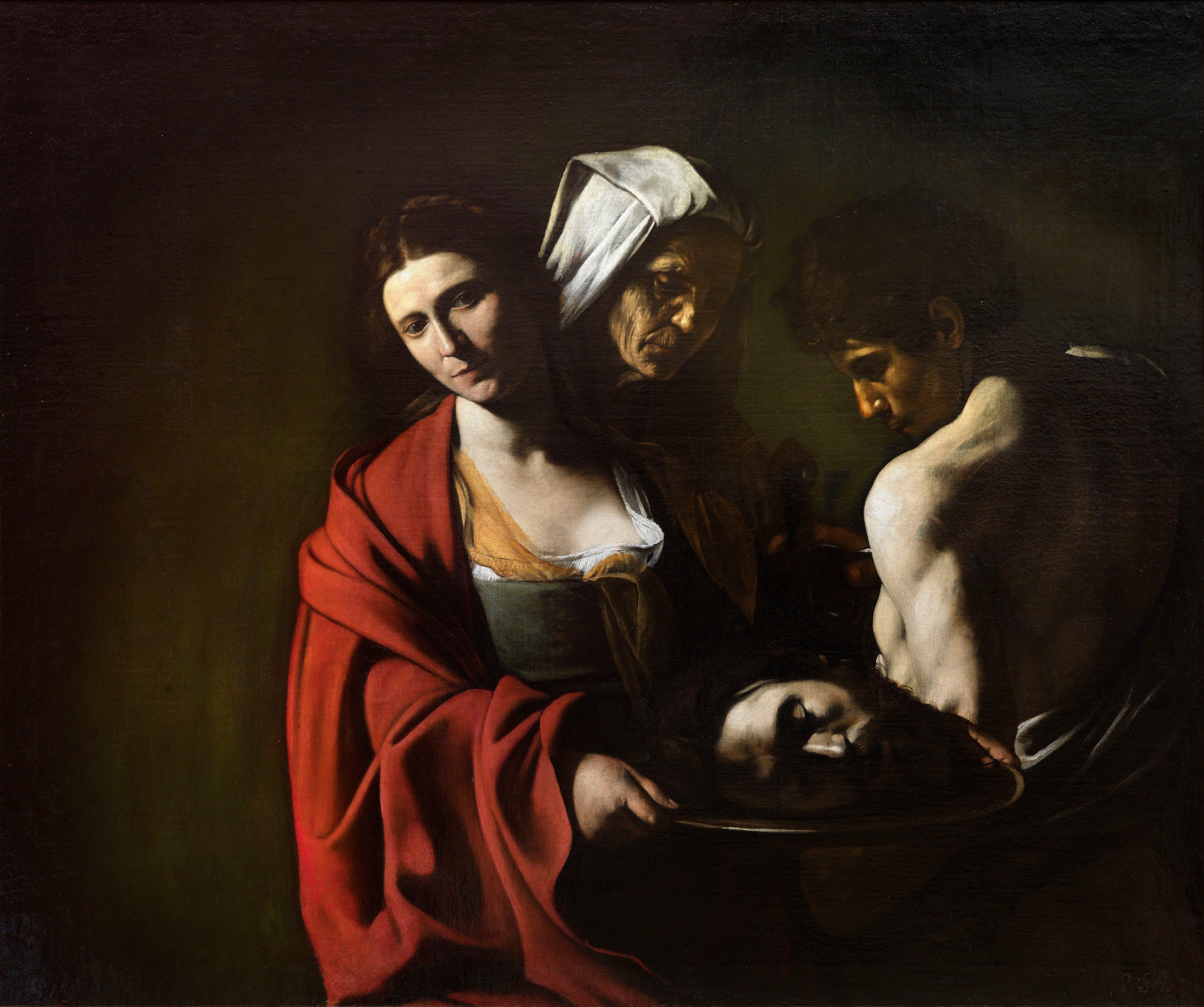
Caravaggio, Salome with the Head of John the Baptist

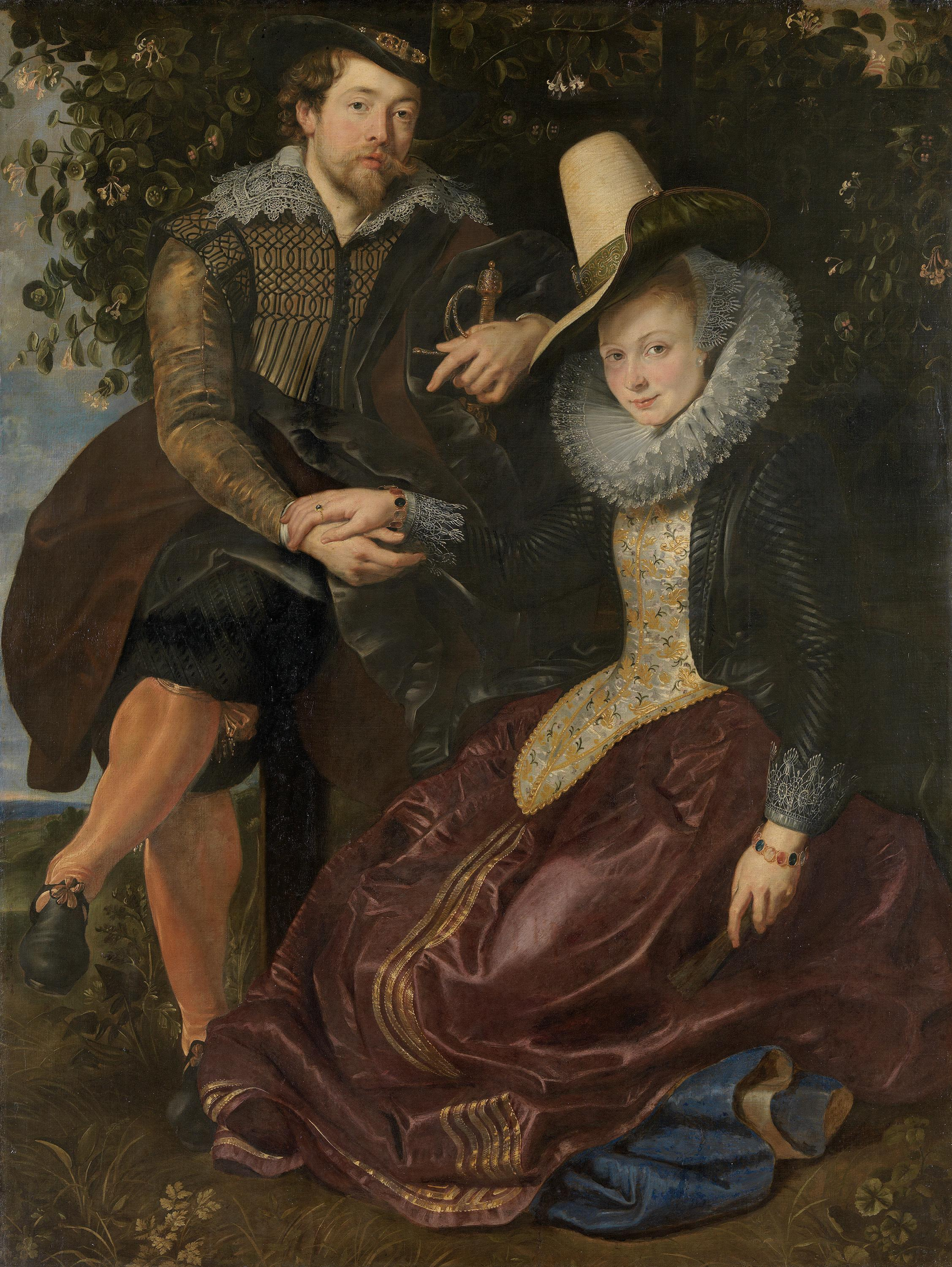
Rubens, Honeysuckle Bower
- Caravaggio
  - The Raising of Lazarus
  - Adoration of the Shepherds
  - Nativity with St. Francis and St. Lawrence
  - Salome with the Head of John the Baptist (Royal Palace of Madrid)
- Adam Elsheimer – The Flight into Egypt
- El Greco – Christ Driving the Money Changers from the Temple (San Ginés, Madrid)
- Peter Paul Rubens – some dates approximate
  - Adoration of the Magi (original version for Antwerp City Hall)
  - The Head of Saint John the Baptist Presented to Salome (c.)
  - Honeysuckle Bower
  - Judith Beheading Holofernes
  - Portrait of a young woman with a rosary

== Births ==
- January 20 – Carlo Ceresa, Italian painter of portraitures, altarpieces and religious works (died 1679)
- March 1 (baptised) – Ambrosius Bosschaert the Younger, Dutch painter (died 1645)
- March 16 – Agostino Mitelli, Italian painter of quadratura (died 1660)
- March 23 (baptised) – Giovanni Benedetto Castiglione, Italian painter (died 1664)
- May 6 (baptised) – Antonie Waterloo, Dutch painter, publisher and draughtsman
- July 28 – Judith Leyster, Dutch painter of Haarlem (died 1660)
- August 25 – Giovanni Battista Salvi or Sassoferrato, Italian painter (died 1685)
- August 30 – Artus Quellinus the Elder, Flemish sculptor (died 1668)
- December 11 – Alexander Cooper, English Baroque miniature painter (died 1660)
- date unknown
  - Jacob Adriaensz Backer, Dutch painter (died 1651)
  - Giovanni Angelo Canini, Italian painter and engraver (died 1666)
  - Giovanni Domenico Cerrini, Italian painter from the Bolognese School (died 1681)
  - Samuel Cooper, English miniature painter (died 1672)
  - Bernardino Gagliardi, Italian painter of the Baroque period (died 1660)
  - Salomon Koninck, Dutch painter of genre scenes and portraits and engraver (died 1656)
  - Carlo Francesco Nuvolone, Italian painter working in Lombardy (died 1661 or 1662)
  - Tobias Pock, Austrian painter (died 1683)
  - Herman Saftleven, Dutch painter of the Baroque period (died 1685)
  - Giulio Cesare Venenti, Italian painter of landscapes and engraver (died 1697)
- probable
  - François Collignon, French engraver, print-seller and publisher (died 1687)
  - Domenico Gargiulo, Italian painter of landscapes (died 1675)

== Deaths ==
- July 15 – Annibale Carracci, Italian painter (born 1560)
- July 20 – Federico Zuccari, Italian Mannerist painter and architect (born 1542/1543)
- October – Joseph Heintz the Elder, Swiss painter, draftsman and architect (born 1564)
- date unknown
  - Giovanni Battista Armenini, Italian art historian and critic (born 1530)
  - Aegidius Sadeler I, Flemish engraver of the Sadeler family (born 1555)
  - Giusto Utens, Flemish painter of a series of Medicean villas (born unknown)
  - Tiburzio Vergelli, Italian sculptor and founder (born 1551)
