= Brookshaw =

Brookshaw is a surname. Notable people with the surname include:

- Dorothy Brookshaw, Canadian sprinter
- George Brookshaw (c. 1751–1823), English painter and engraver
- Richard Brookshaw (1748–c.1779), English engraver
- Tracy Brookshaw, Canadian professional wrestler, better known by her ring name Traci Brooks
