= Goodaver stone circle =

Stone circle on Bodmin Moor, Cornwall, England

- Dons Meyn Kosmeur (Cornish)
- Location within Cornwall
- 50.548596°N 4.530086°W
- Type: Stone circle
- Periods: Bronze Age
- Location: Bodmin Moor, Cornwall

Goodaver, Goodaver stone circle or Goodaver circle (Cornish: Dons Meyn Kosmeur) (grid reference SX20857515) is a stone circle located in the parish of Altarnun, near Bolventor on Bodmin Moor in Cornwall.

== Description ==
The circle has a diameter of 32.3 metres (106 ft) (almost exactly to thirty nine Megalithic Yards) and consists of twenty three standing stones and one recumbent that has disappeared over the last century, they were originally thought to number twenty eight. The stones are well presented situated near the top of Shephard's Hill at an altitude of 306 metres (1,004 ft). The stones are generally rectangular and measure between 0.6 metres (2.0 ft) and 1.6 metres (5.2 ft) high by 1.45 feet (0.44 m) wide. They are spaced approximately 3.7 metres (12 ft) apart, slightly more irregular but in line with other big Bodmin Moor circles. Reverend A. H. Malan discovered the circle in 1906 when only three stones remained standing. Local farmers supplied workers to erect the fallen stones in their current position and it is clear that several stones were inverted, spaced incorrectly with some reversed faces and possibly in the wrong places.

== Archaeology ==
There are remains of a large hilltop cairn is situated approximately 80 metres (260 ft) southwest of the stone circle at (grid reference SX20927509). The cairn shows no sign of kerb or cist and consists of a rocky mound covered in turf and approximately 19.5 metres (64 ft) in diameter and 0.7 metres (2.3 ft) high. Stones may have been removed for use in adjacent dry stone walls as it has been damaged on the northern side. There are also some remaining hut circles in the area showing signs of ancient settlement.

== Literature ==
- William Borlase (1754). Observations on the antiquities, historical and monumental, of the county of Cornwall ...: Consisting of several essays on the first inhabitants, Druid-superstition, customs, and remains of the most remote antiquity, in Britain, and the British Isles ... With a summary of the religious, civil, and military state of Cornwall before the Norman Conquest ... Printed by W. Jackson, in the High-Strand.
- William Copeland Borlase (1872). Naenia Cornubiae: the cromlechs and tumuli of Cornwall. Llanerch. ISBN 978-1-897853-36-8.
- William C. Lukis (1885). The prehistoric stone monuments of the British Isles: Cornwall. Printed for Nichols and Sons for the Society of Antiquaries.
- Aubrey Burl (2005). A guide to the stone circles of Britain, Ireland and Brittany. Yale University Press. ISBN 978-0-300-11406-5.
