= Colyton Grammar School =

Grammar school, academy in Devon, England

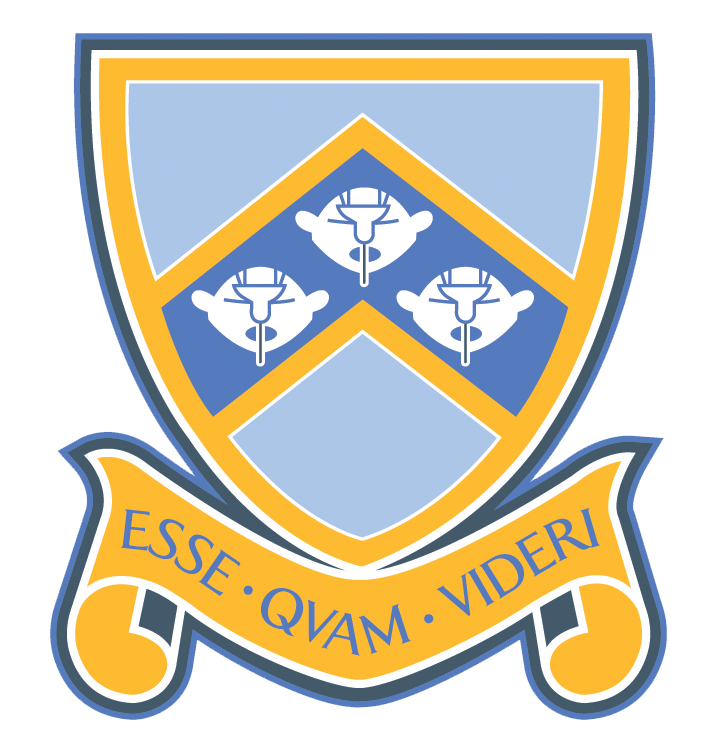

Location
- Whitwell Lane; Colyford, Devon, EX24 6HN; England; 50.728°N 3.0725°W

Information
- Type: Grammar school, Academy
- Mottoes: Expectation, Excellence, and Enjoyment; Esse Qvam Videri (To be rather than to seem)
- Religious affiliation: Church of England
- Established: 1546; 480 years ago
- Founders: Feoffees of Colyton
- Specialist: Science
- Department for Education URN: 136366 Tables
- Ofsted: Reports
- Chair of Trustees: Ian Griffin
- Headmaster: Timothy Harris
- Gender: Mixed
- Age: 11 to 18
- Enrolment: 1023, including 6th Form
- Houses: 5: Ash, Beech, Cedar, Oak, and Elm, with their seal being that of their respective trees
- Colours: blue and gold
- Publication: Seven Stripes
- Website: https://www.colytongrammar.com/

Colyton Grammar School (CGS) is a co-educational grammar school (and academy) located in the village of Colyford in East Devon, England, that caters for pupils aged 11 to 18. The school has been classified by Ofsted as "Outstanding" in three successive reports. As of 2023 it was ranked by The Sunday Times as the ninth-best state school in the country, and the best in the South West. Founded by local merchants in 1546, the school is situated on an 18-acre site near the Devon coast.

== History ==
In 1546 a group of 20 yeomen and merchants petitioned the Crown to buy back the confiscated property of the executed Earl of Devon. They were granted this land and property in a Royal Charter in 1546 by a deed of enfeoffment there by becoming the Feoffees of Colyton, one of the 80 oldest charities in England still operating today. Their first act was to endow a grammar school in the later half of the 16th century and by a second Royal Charter granted by Elizabeth I directing a school be maintained with a grant of £5.00 a year "for the goodly and virtuous education of 20 poor boys forever".

The existing school was a petty school situated in a single room, the parvise room, over the porch of the parish church where the local priest educated the son of local merchants and yeomen until the Feoffees converted The Church House (a property confiscated from the Earl of Devon) in 1612, the first real home of Colyton Grammar School remaining there until 1929 when the school moved to its present site in Colyford.

The first headmaster on record was William Hull, who joined the school in 1603, for a salary of £5 a year. The first headmistress – Mrs. Susanah Stokes – was appointed in 1792. It was only in 1875 that the school was established as a day and boarding school with its current name – Colyton Grammar School.

On 20 June 1876, the school population reached a record low of just one pupil. Numbers steadily increased again and by August 1884, there were 33 pupils. The school was closed in 1900 due to a lack of pupils and remained closed until 1905, when it was re-opened with a new headmaster.

In 1913, a change made in the school's constitution allowed girls to be admitted for the first time and the school officially became a co-educational grammar school. A Board of Governors with fifteen members was established in 1914. In 1929, the school moved to its present site in Colyford.

== Recent developments ==
The school began a program of development and expansion in 1991, adding and renovating many buildings over the subsequent two decades. This included two new Study Centres, the "Study Centre" and the "Sindalls Building", a major renovation of the Chemistry block, the "Jowett Building", a new, expansive Science and Design & Technology block, the "Feoffees Building", a new Music building, a new Art building, the large "Walker Building" which contains the school library, called "The Elizabeth Preston Library", History, Psychology and Modern Languages classrooms, a new Humanities building, the "Coly Building", including RE and Geography classrooms, a new canteen named "Take Five" (renamed "Maddy's" in 2024 to honour a deceased alumnus), and a complete refurbishment of the "Cottrill Hall", the main school hall.

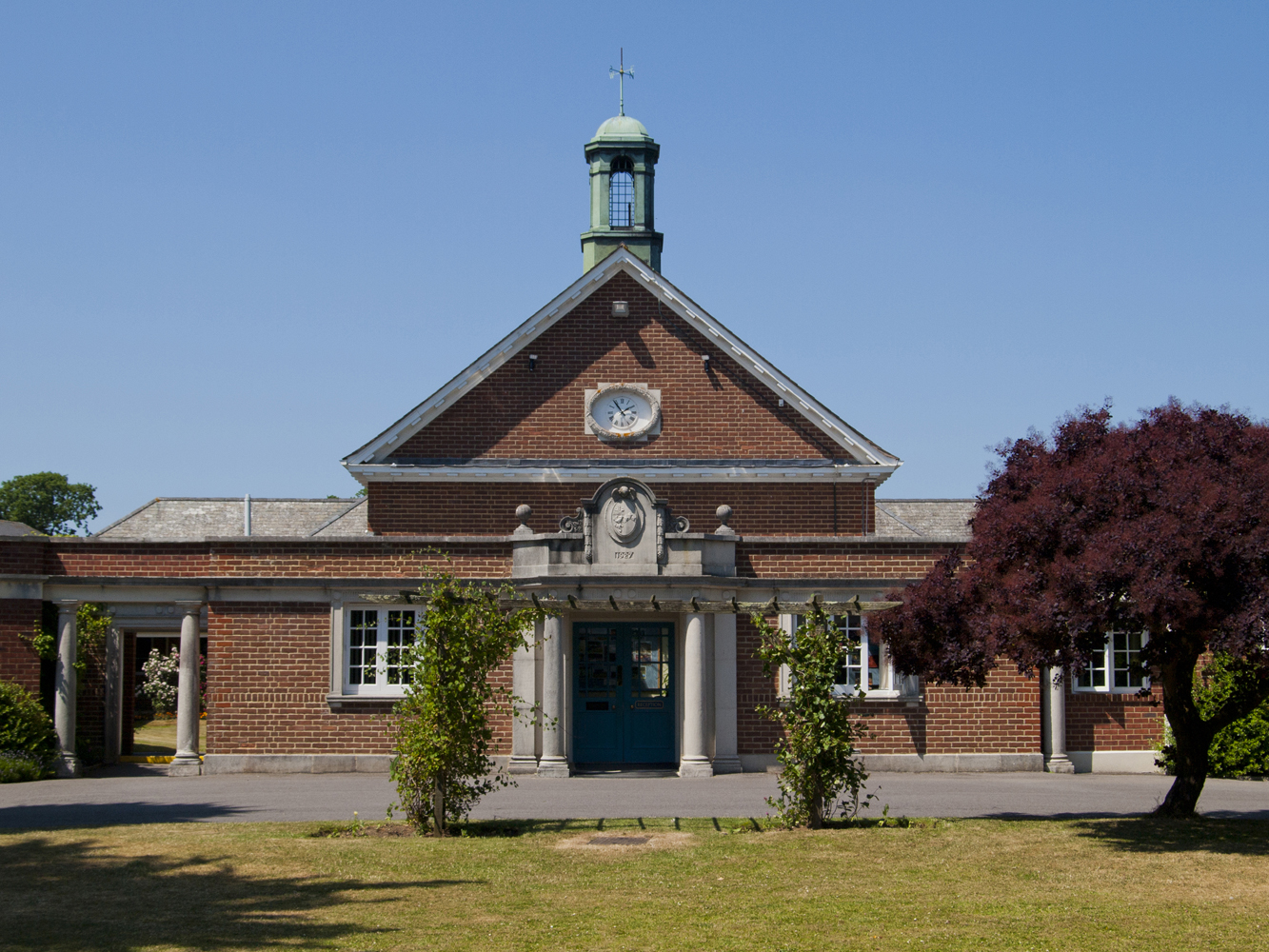
Front of Colyton Grammar School, 2013

On 1 January 2011, Devon County Council ceased to maintain the school. The school became one of the Coalition Government's Academies. Colyton Grammar School Academy Trust, an exempt charity and company limited by guarantee, assumed responsibility for this state-funded independent school.

In 2019, the Drama Studio was removed and replaced with a classroom and a new Wellbeing Centre. The old computing rooms were converted into classrooms and the tech labs were turned into the new computing rooms. Following these redevelopments, in 2022 the East Wing of the school was renovated to install a new Drama Studio named after former teacher and benefactor Sid Bradbeer. It was opened by actor and alumnus Tom Brittney.

In 2023 a partnership investment between the school, Parents’ Association, alumni, local grant awarding bodies and the local authority resulted in a new sports-pitch, available for the students and the local community. It was opened by Ollie Devoto of the Exeter Chiefs.

On 12 May 2023 the school decided to end the tradition of "Muck-Up Day", resulting in Year 13s coming into school dressed as "Pirates and Princesses" and being barred from lessons before being sent home, days before their A-level exams.

At the beginning of the 2023/2024 school year several classrooms had to be closed due to RAAC concrete, including the recently renovated east wing. This led to the closure of the Drama studio (less than a year after its opening) and many amenities in the east wing. Hence many temporary classrooms and temporary portable cabins have been erected in the school site. The large new building on the front of the school lawn, opposite the reception, provides the school with a spacious new science classroom, and a drama studio (fitted out with lighting technology for rehearsal purposes).

=== Curriculum ===
The school is a member of the South West Academic Trust, which brings together selective schools across the south west of England to share good practice. The school, as of 2007, had students taking GCSEs in Year 10 as opposed to Year 11, allowing for a three-year Sixth Form. As of September 2016, the GCSE exams are taken in Year 11 again, with the first examinations being taken in 2017–2018. This has meant a return to a two-year Sixth Form. Now, the students start the GCSE curriculum in Year 9, giving them 3 years to learn the content. There were no GCSE examinations taken in the academic year 2016–2017. There were falling grades as part of a national trend in 2013 but since then grades at GCSE have recovered.

Beginning in the academic year 2017–2018, 155 new students are admitted each year (as opposed to the former 124), with the introduction of a 5th House, Elm.

== Staff ==
As of August 2025, there are 126 staff members at Colyton Grammar School, including site and catering staff.

== Notable Colytonian Alumni ==
- Tom Brittney, actor
- Tom Brooks, writer and theorist
- Florence Nightingale David, statistician
- Tom Moran, screenwriter
- Sir Rex Richards, scientist and academic, former Vice-Chancellor of the University of Oxford
- Carry Somers, fashion designer, social entrepreneur and fashion campaigner
- Innes Fitzgerald, British track and field athlete and cross country runner
