= Matías de Arteaga y Alfaro =

Spanish painter (c. 1630–1704)

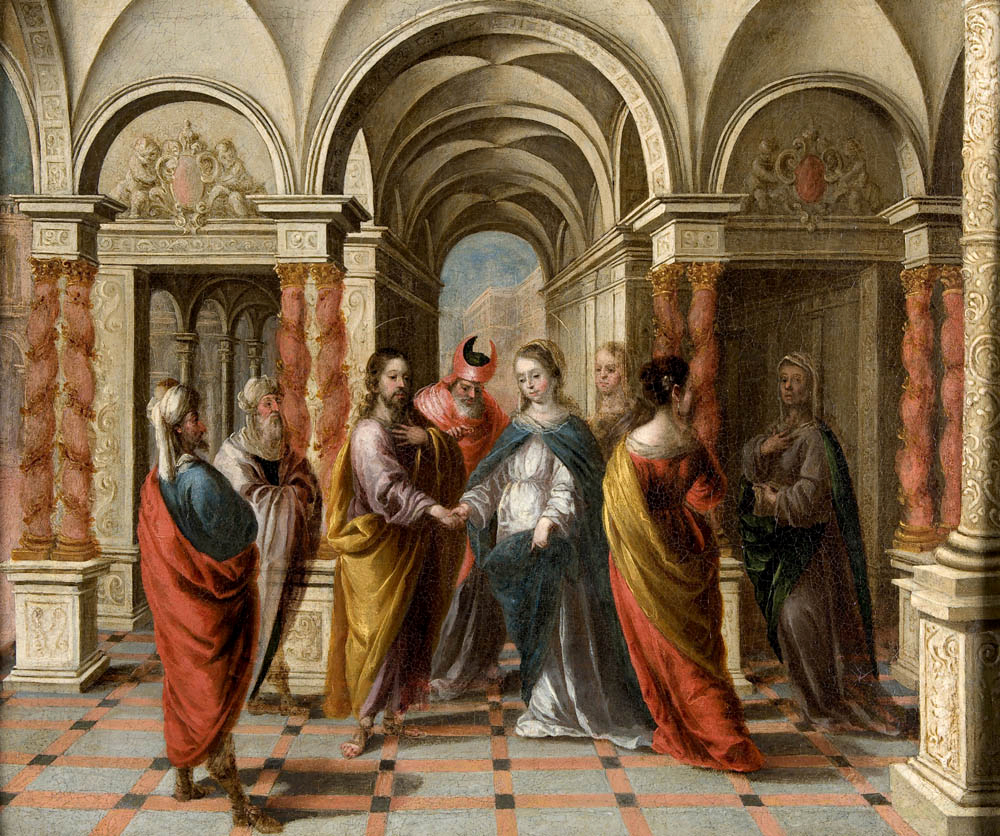
The Marriage of the Virgin by Matias de Arteaga, private collection, before 1703

Matías de Arteaga y Alfaro, also Matias de Arteaga, (c. 1630–1704) was a Spanish painter and engraver.

Arteaga was born in Seville about 1630, the son of the engraver Bartolomé Arteaga. He studied painting under Valdés Leal. His paintings are mostly of the Virgin Mary, with architectural backgrounds. They include two altarpieces in the conventual church of San Pablo.

He made engravings after various works by Valdés and Francisco Herrera the Younger, and one of St. Dominick after a drawing by Alonso Cano; also a St. Ferdinand by Murillo, for La Torre Farfan's account of the Seville festival in honour of St. Ferdinand; for which he likewise engraved views of the Giralda tower of Seville, and of the interior and exterior of cathedral. He also executed a series of fifty-eight plates for the History of St. Juan de la Cruz, the first barefooted Carmelite. He engraved a plate of the arms of the family of Arze for a book dedicated to a member of the house, in 1695. His works are usually signed with his name in full, or in an abbreviated form. He died at Seville in 1704.

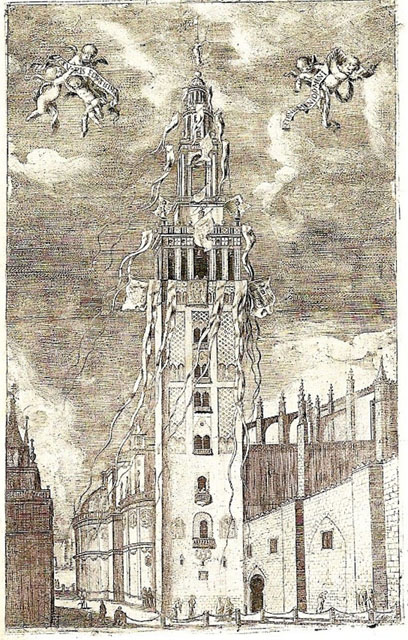
Engraving of the Giralda, published in a work by Fernando de la Torre Farfan in 1672
