= Richard Brookshaw =

English engraver

Richard Brookshaw (1748 – in or after 1779) was an English mezzotint engraver.

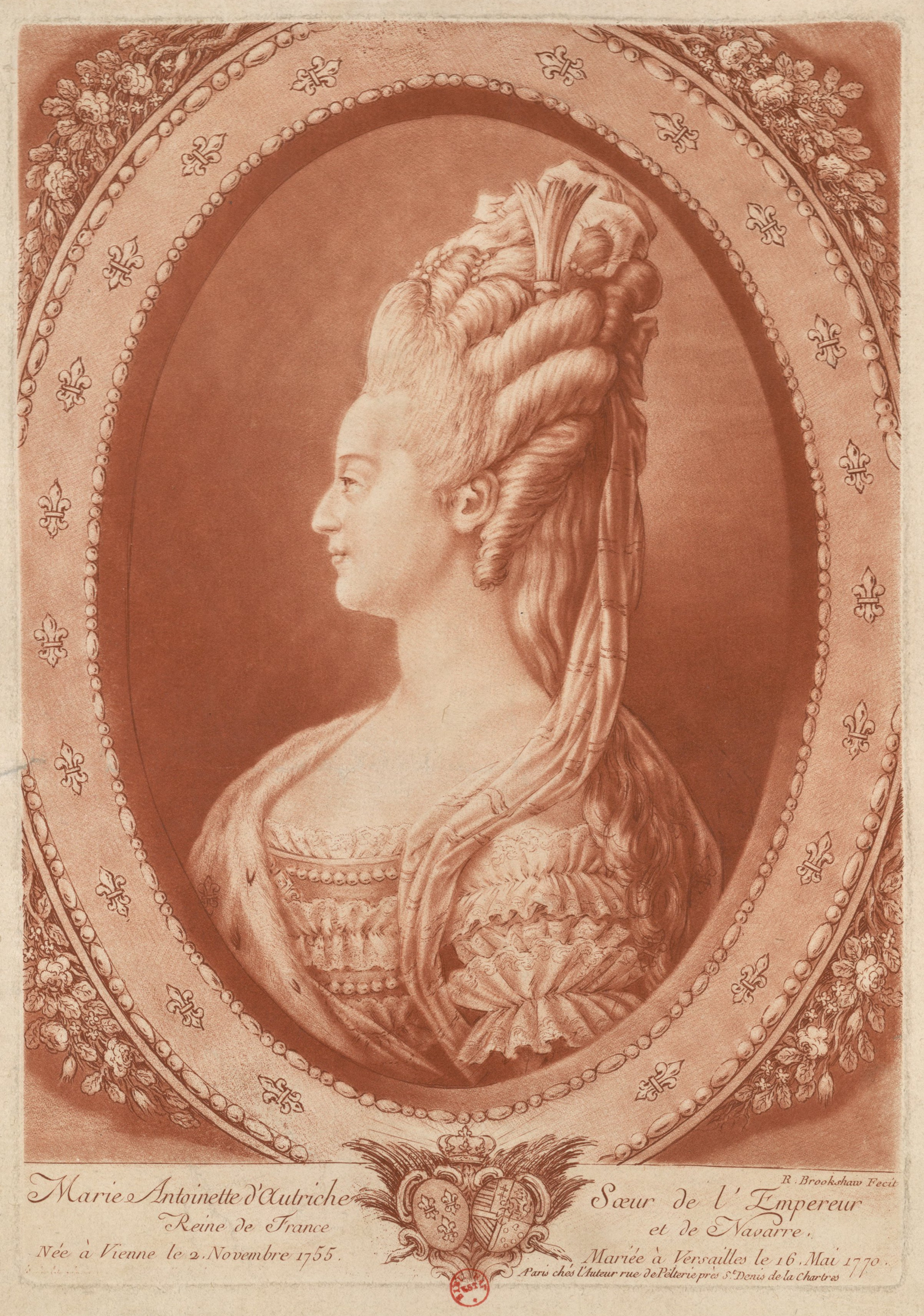
Marie Antoinette, engraving from the 1770s.

== Life ==
Brookshaw worked for some years producing reduced engraved copies from popular prints by James MacArdell (1729?-1765), James Watson (1739?-1790), and others. He then travelled to Paris, where he established himself in the "Rue de Tournon, vis-à-vis l'Hôtel de Nivernois, chez le Bourrelier", and in 1773 published a pair of portraits of the Dauphin, afterwards Louis XVI, and Marie Antoinette. These proved so popular that Brookshaw engraved them 5 times in different sizes.

His talents were highly appreciated in France, and during his residence there he produced some excellent plates - now scarce. Whether he returned, at any time, to England is not known, neither is the place or date of his death. The last record of him are some plates in the "Pomona Britannica" (a botanical work illustrated by George Brookshaw, Richard's brother, and published in 1804).

His best works published in France were the above-mentioned portraits, and those of the Duke of Orleans, the Countess d'Artois, and the Countess de Provence. Among those engraved in England are 'Christ on the Cross,' after A. van Dyck (1771); 'Thunderstorm at Sea,' after Hendrik Kobell (1770); 'The Jovial Gamesters,' after A. van Ostade; portraits of Miss Greenfield (1767) and Miss Emma Crewe and her sister, after Sir Joshua Reynolds.
