= Tom Brooks (writer) =

British writer and theorist

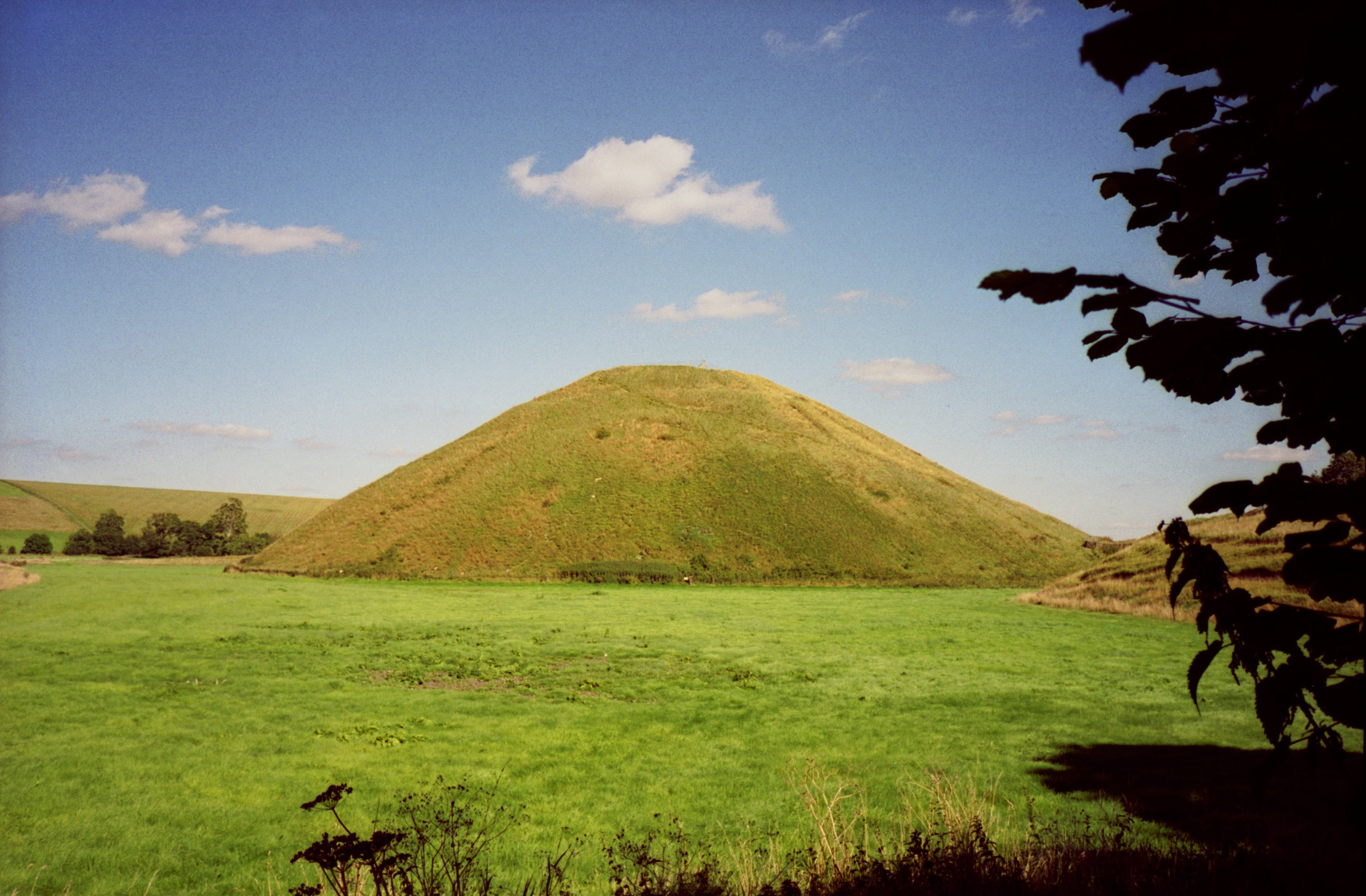
- Silbury Hill
- Born: London, United Kingdom
- Known for: theories of Prehistoric geometry in Britain
- Scientific career
- Fields: Writer

Tom Brooks is a British author, draftsman and a proponent of Prehistoric geometry theories.

Brooks was born in London and attended East Sheen Grammar School before returning to his family home in Devon where he attended Colyton Grammar School. His career included time spent in the Royal Navy along with being a Marketing director and a draftsman.

Brooks has concentrated on theorizing upon the layout and geometry of ancient sites in Britain and has published three books on the subject: The Hand of Man; Prehistoric Geometry in Britain; and 'Seeing Around Corners' – Geometry in Stone Age Britain – The Proof. In a survey of over 1500 ancient sites in Britain, Brooks claims that many were constructed by prehistoric man on a connecting grid of isosceles triangles spiraling outwards from Silbury Hill (pictured) with each triangle pointing to the next site. Monuments that comprised the grid included hillforts, standing stones, churches and stone circles such as Stonehenge. Archaeologists have made the criticism that many such patterns can be easily found as Britain is so rich in ancient sites of different types from different periods.

== Publications ==
- The Hand of Man. Now out of print, published Edward Gaskell.
- Prehistoric Geometry in Britain. Self-published. Out of print.
- Seeing Around Corners. Geometry in Stone Age Britain- the Proof. Previously available from http://www.prehistoric-geometry.co.uk/.

== See also ==
- Ley lines
- Alexander Thom
- Anne Macaulay
