= Andrew Glazewski =

Polish priest (1905–1973)

Canon Andrew Glazewski
- Born: 3 March 1905; Chmielowa, Ukraine
- Died: 6 November 1973 (aged 68)
- Other name: Andrew
- Occupations: Parish Priest to Polish exiles at Ilford Park, physicist, public speaker, educator
- Title: Canon, Deacon

Canon Andrew Konstanty Glazewski (1905 – 6 November 1973) was a Polish Catholic priest, lecturer in spirituality, healer, and researcher into dowsing, the Earth's magnetic field, and paranormal phenomena.

He settled in Britain in 1947 after serving as chaplain to the Polish forces during World War II. From 1948 until his death, he served as parish priest at Ilford Park, a settlement of Polish exiles in South Devon. His published papers examine the nature of gravity, the human field, the Earth's magnetism, the mechanics of prayer, and the theory and practice of healing. A close associate of Sir George Trevelyan, he co-founded the Scientific and Medical Network.

== Early life and education ==
Glazewski was born in the family home on the banks of the Dniestr, close to the Ukrainian village of Chmielowa. The family was landed gentry and regarded themselves as Polish, though Poland did not exist as a political entity. In 1915, the family moved to Lviv. He enrolled in Lviv University to study law. However, in 1924, he received his priesthood vocation. At first, he joined the Dominican order, but finding the discipline too austere, he entered a secular novitiate in Lviv. He was ordained in 1931 and subsequently studied Theology at Angelicum University in Rome. In 1938, he returned to Poland and was assigned a small parish near Chmielowa. Following the outbreak of World War II, he escaped through Romania to Rome and came to Britain in 1940. He served as army chaplain to the Polish forces and attained the rank of captain. Following D-Day, he was assigned as chaplain to the 10th Mounted Rifles Regiment and sent to Europe. He was wounded twice and later received the Polish Cross of Valour and the Silver Cross of Merit with Swords. Returning to England, he served as chaplain to a large community of Polish exiles housed in army barracks near Newton Abbot, Devon --- a position he held until his death.

== Work with Jan Rosen ==
While at Lviv University (1923-1925), Andrew Glazewski worked closely with the artist Jan Henryk de Rosen, who was commissioned to paint the interior of the Armenian Cathedral in Lviv. Rosen used Glazewski as a model for Saint Andrew in his fresco "The Founding of the Blessed Sacrament" and as Saint Stephen. Later, while attending the Lviv Seminary, Glazewski founded a youth movement, "Odrodzenie," whose goal was to renew the Catholic faith that was frequently met in the Cathedral. Around 1931, Rosen painted Glazewski as the priest Ignacy Skorupca in his fresco "The Miracle at the Vistula" in the Pope's private chapel at Castello Gandolfo.

== Scientific Interests ==
Along with his theological studies, Glazewski studied physics and became conversant with the latest Relativity and Quantum Mechanics discoveries. After discovering that he could use his hands to heal, sometimes over large distances, he formulated a field theory to explain how it worked. In "The Gravitational Wave," he speculates that gravity contains a scalar field analogous to sound. "The Music of Crystals, Plants and Human Beings" built on the works of J.C. Bose, Alexander Gurwitsch and Gustaf Stromberg. It explores the role of sound and musical harmonics in the development and form of crystals, plants, and animals. The paper shows how he tested many of his theories in his laboratory. "A New Suspension of the Magnetic Needle" describes a detector he built to measure the Earth's vertical current and the data he gathered using this detector. He also develops his hypothesis that a bar magnet has additional poles, East-West poles. Throughout his life, he taught the Psycho-Physical Healing technique that he had developed, a precursor to non-contact healing methods such as Therapeutic Touch. He explained the physics behind the healing technique in his paper to the London Hospital Gazette.

== Spiritual and pastoral work ==
Glazewski was in strong demand as a retreat leader in Polish communities such as the boys' school, Divine Mercy College, and parishes in London. He held annual camps for young people of his parish on St. Mary's (Isles of Scilly). He was recognized for his healing work and spiritual teaching in his parish and among English-speaking congregations. He drew on the psychological works of Carl Jung, Dionysius the Areopagite, and the musicologist Hans Kayser. An admirer of Thomas Aquinas's theology, he translated part of the Summa Theologica into Polish. He taught contemplative prayer and meditation, emphasizing God as a field that permeates all of nature. In 1965, Sir George Trevelyan invited Glazewski to lecture at the adult education center at Attingham Park in Shropshire on psychology and healing. He taught there regularly until the Center's closure in 1971.

Glazewski often spoke about founding a university that would study issues at the boundary of spirituality and medicine. In 1973, he contacted George Blaker and Dr Patrick Shackleton, Dean of Postgraduate Medical Studies at the University of Southampton, and suggested they collaborate to find such a center. They subsequently established the Scientific and Medical Network.

He died of a heart attack while participating in a workshop at Hawkwood College near Stroud on 6 November 1973. His body rests in Newton Abbot cemetery.

== Bibliography ==
"The Gravitational Wave," Proceedings of the Scientific and Technical Congress of Radionics and Radiesthesia, London, May 1950.

"The Music of Crystals, Plants and Human Beings" Radio, Perception, September 1951

"A New Suspension of the Magnetic Needle," Radio Perception Vol XI, 80, June 1953

"Can there be any science behind Healing Hands?" The London Hospital Gazette, March 1967.

"Milosc" from the "Summa Teologica" by St. Thomas Aquinas, translated into Polish with notes by Andrew Glazewski. Publ. Veritas, 1967

"The Human Field in Medical Problems," Psionic Medicine, 1970

"The Pattern of Telepathic Communication," The Radionic Association, 1974.

"The Mechanics of Prayer," The Wrekin Trust, 1974

Harmony of the Universe, A compilation of talks and writings, with biography and personal memories by Paul Kieniewicz, White Crow Books, 2014, ISBN 1910121002

Audio Lectures by Canon Andrew Glazewski

The Mechanics of Prayer, 1965

The Science Behind Healing, 1968

Angels, 1968
