= Patrickholme bone bead =

- Material: Bone
- Created: Bronze Age
- Discovered: Patrickholme, Lanarkshire, Scotland by J. H. Maxwell

The Patrickholme bone bead is a square sectioned bone fragment with a perforated hollow through the middle.

It was found during archaeological excavations in Patrickholme sand quarry in Lanarkshire, Scotland by J. H. Maxwell in 1949. It has been tentatively suggested that this might be tangible evidence of a prehistoric unit of measurement. It measures 33mm and is suggested to date to the Bronze Age. Due to oxidization its original length is uncertain. Three and a half beads were found in total with five other bones that may have been beads. The Patrickholme bone bead was the only one showing a square section that was likely to have been artificially shaped.

== See also ==
- Dalgety bone bead
