= Dalgety bone bead =

Archaeological discovery in Scotland

- Material: Bone
- Created: Bronze Age
- Discovered: Dalgety, Fife, Scotland by Trevor Watkins

The Dalgety bone bead is a square sectioned, burnt bone fragment with a perforated hollow through the middle.

It was found during archaeological excavations at Barns Farm, Dalgety, Fife, Scotland, in the context of an Early Bronze Age grave. The grave contained a single inhumed body in a coffin, accompanied by remains of three cremations. The bone bead was found amongst the burnt bone fragments of one of the cremations. It measures 32mm (oxidisation means the original length is unknown) and is suggested to date to the Bronze Age.

== See also ==
- Patrickholme bone bead
