= Jan František Händl =

Czech priest & painter (1691–1751)

Jan František Händl (1691 - 8 March 1751) was a Czech Roman Catholic priest and baroque painter.

Händl Manetin worked at first as a chaplain. He was self-taught painter, and spent time with Petr Brandl in Manětín. After the death of Parson Alexius Pleschner in 1721, Händl became a pastor, and for his work was later promoted to the deanery. Händl died in the spring of 1751 to inflammation of the neck and was buried in his own tomb, which he himself had designed. In 1932 the tomb was opened, but it was empty.

In 1730, he painted an altarpiece of Saint Joseph. In 1738 he painted John the Baptist and two images of Christ and the Crucifixion, which are located on the side altars of the Manětínská church. In the years 1742, 1744 and 1745 he painted a series of paintings for the Manětínská church cemetery: Barbara of Portugal, Visitation of the Virgin Mary, Saint Lawrence and Jude the Apostle. Five years later they added a picture of Wenceslaus I, Duke of Bohemia. He painted in 1750 an altarpiece of Saint Peter and Saint Paul.
