= Honeysuckle Bower =

Painting by Peter Paul Rubens

The Honeysuckle Bower
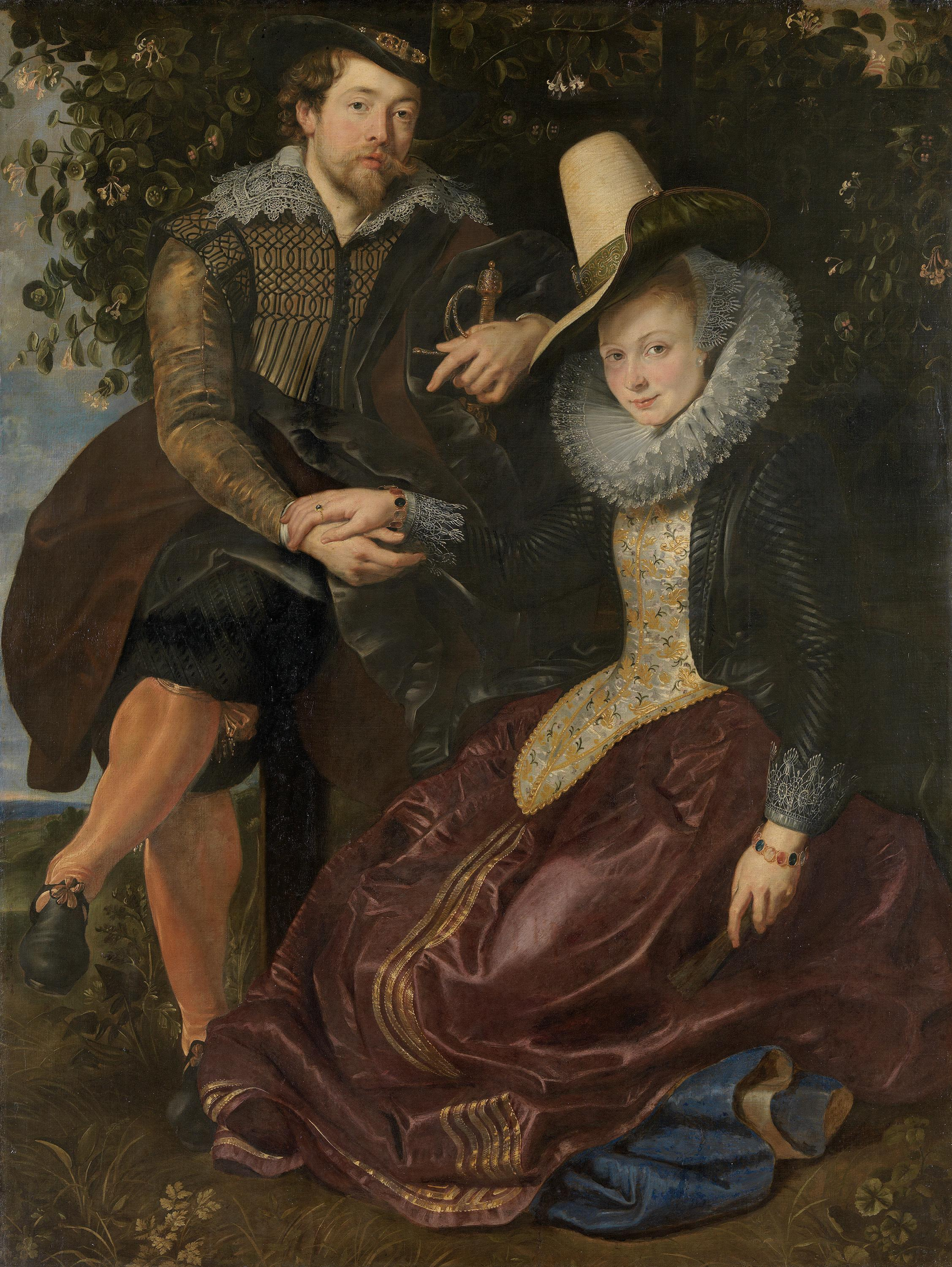
- Artist: Peter Paul Rubens
- Year: c. 1609
- Medium: Oil on canvas
- Dimensions: 178 cm × 136.5 cm (70 in × 53.7 in)
- Location: Alte Pinakothek; Munich

The Honeysuckle Bower is a self-portrait of the Flemish Baroque painter Peter Paul Rubens and his first wife Isabella Brant, painted c. 1609.The couple is seated in fine clothes within a garden composition and a vine of honeysuckle is placed overhead. The symbolism of the double-portrait alludes to meanings of love and marriage, such as the holding of right hands (dextrarum iunctio), and the concept of the garden of love. The pose of the two figures and their fine clothing signify self-fashioning by Rubens. They wed in 1609, the same year that work was created; it was ultimately given to Isabella's father Jan Brant and would later end up in the collection of Johann Wilhelm II of Düsseldorf. The couple would be married for seventeen years, and have three children before Isabella died in 1625. Her death would have a profound impact on Rubens and through his loss he created an posthumous portrait.

== Description ==
The painting is a full-length double portrait of the couple seated in a bower (wikt), also called an arbor of honeysuckle. The couple is dressed in fine clothing of an aristocratic class within this portrait while also maintaining a casual and adoring pose. They are surrounded by love and marriage symbolism: the honeysuckle and garden are both traditional symbols of love, and the holding of right hands (junctio dextrarum) represents union through marriage.

=== Symbolism ===
The honeysuckle plant has had various meanings over the years. Most notably, the meaning that is still associated with the flower, began in the Middle Ages. The overall qualities that the honeysuckle plant symbolized was the idea of lasting pleasure; it also had meanings of steadfastness and permanence. This became a typical symbol found in paintings in the time of Rubens.

The Garden of Love was a popular literary concept and symbol around the same time that the painting was created. The initial concept may have come from symbols of paradise that were present in medieval cloister gardens. Another element that may have influenced this was Roman de la Rose, as well as the role of the garden in aristocratic society. In these scenes, women depicted as objects of admiration by their suitors and the garden is full of joyfulness and music.

In this painting Rubens and Isabella join their right hands in an act of Dextrarum iunctio. Dextrarum iunctio was the ceremony of joining the right hands of a couple together, and it has ancient Roman origins. This symbol most likely referred to the idea of harmony within the marriage of Rubens and Isabella. Additionally, Rubens depicts himself as an aristocratic gentleman with his left hand on the hilt of his sword. The sword is an important piece in Ruben's noble portrayal here, since the carrying of a sword was a symbol only permitted to those of the elite class. Rubens gained permission when he became the court painter for governors of the Netherlands.

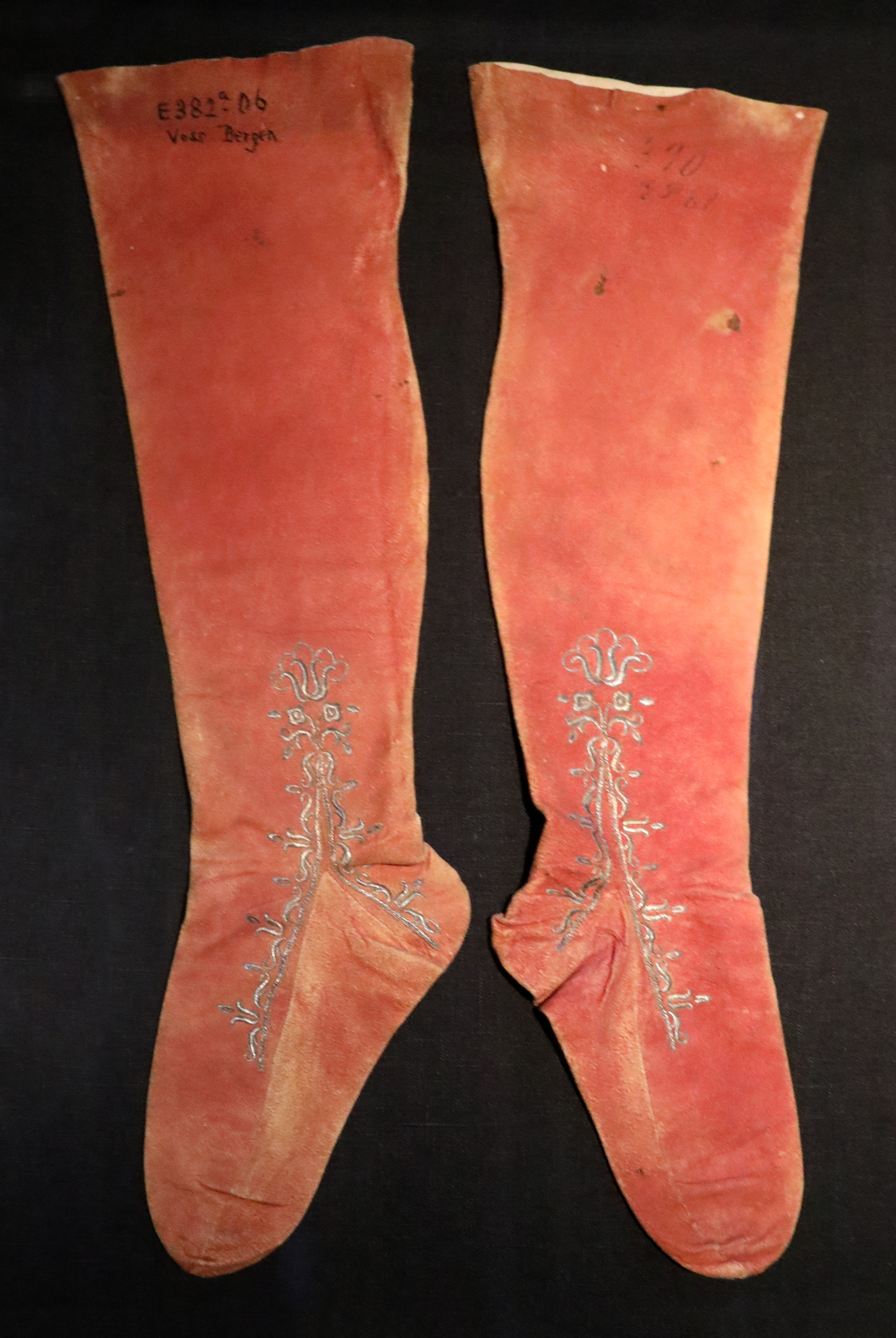
Red stockings from 17th century

The symbols found within the artwork point to self-fashioning by Rubens, because of the aristocratic portrayal and symbolism. This can be seen in the orange silk stockings, the bejeweled hat on his head, and the collar around his neckline. One detail to note is the unbuttoned collar which signifies a marriage formed through an intellectual match. In her left hand, symbolizing both her gentility and femininity, Isabella holds a fan.

The pose of the two figures is more casual and modest compared to the noble clothing that they are wearing. Isabella is seated on the ground and recalls the Madonna of Humility, thus constructing an image as a virtuous wife. At the same time, the pose that Rubens constructs Isabella in also displays his attention to her and his overall devotion as a husband.

=== Historical context ===
They wed on 3 October 1609, in St. Michael's Abbey, Antwerp, shortly after he had returned to the city after eight years in Italy. Rubens was thirty-two and Isabella Brant was eighteen at the time, they would go on to have three children together and seventeen years of marriage, before Isabella died in 1625. Most likely she died from the bubonic plague. When Isabella died, Rubens was tremendously impacted and wrote letters and crafted a posthumous portrait of her. Within this portrait, Rubens, gives the lasting message of eternal friendship and love.

Rubens remarked in a letter to Pierre Dupuy in July of 1626 about this profound loss:

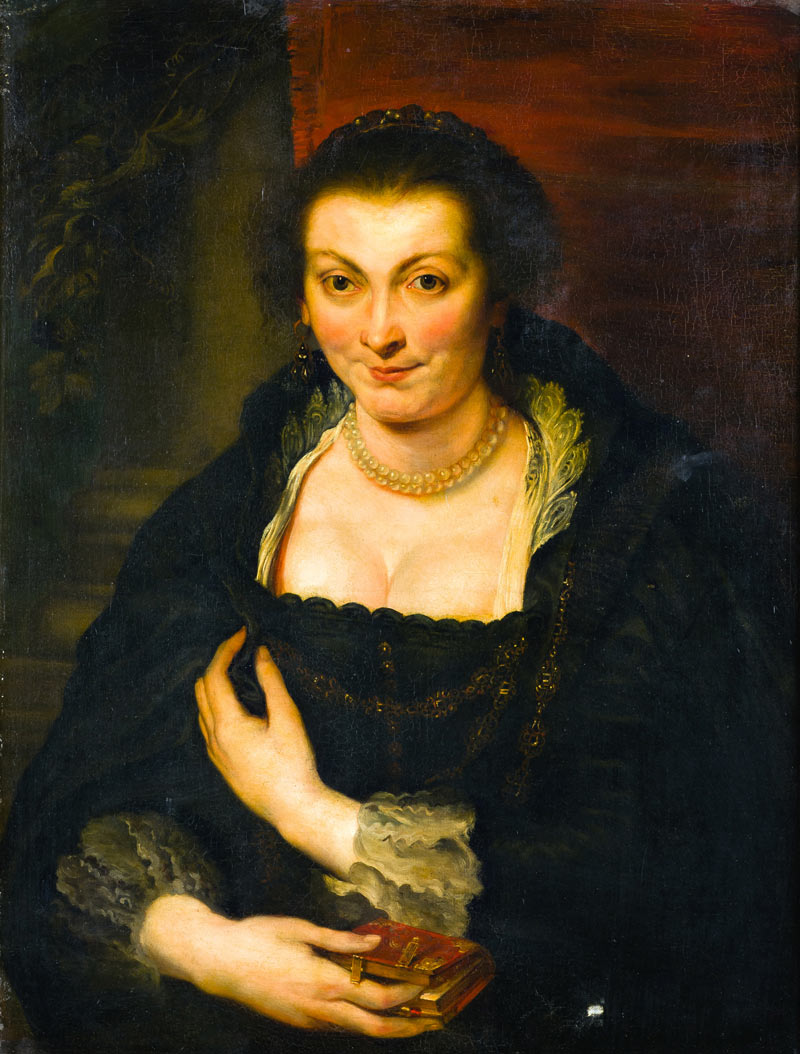
Posthumous portrait of Isabella Brant

"... Truly I have lost an excellent companion, whom one could love - indeed had to love, with good reason - as having none of the faults of her sex. She had no capricious moods, and no feminine weak: ness, but was all goodness and honesty. And because of her virtues she was loved during her lifetime, and mourned by all at her death. Such a loss seems to me worthy of deep feeling, and since the true remedy for all ills is Forgetfulness, daughter of Time, I must without doubt look to her for help. But I find it very hard to separate grief for this loss from the memory of a person whom I must love and cherish as long as I live…"

Other important historical contexts contributed to the meaning of this double portrait, including the popular art theories and books at the time, mainly, the concept of liefde baart kunst and the use of emblem books in the construction of this painting by Rubens.

The idea of topos liefde baart kunst in art was a major component of art theory in the Netherlands at this time. This essentially translates to "love begets art," meaning that art develops from love; this idea of love is very important in the realm of the artist. This idea was expressed as the love of art and or God; it also combines two types of love, conjugal and erotic. In other words, this concept explored the idea of a muse and model relationship with the artist.This particular artwork by Rubens is one example of this concept illustrated in painting, specifically the idea of the wife or spouse as the model and that relationship in tales.

The idea of marriage was also an important concept for Rubens and other artists of this period as it symbolized a moral and respectable person. Rubens may have been influenced by a notable and popular emblem book about the "domestication of love," titled, Amorum Emblemata (1608) by Otto van Veen. Also of note that the author of this emblem book was Rubens' teacher, and thus had a large influence on him. Amorum Emblemata was created in multiple-language issues, such as Latin-Italian-French, Latin-English-Italian, Latin-Dutch-French. Each version of the book had essentially the same basic information of mottos and quotations in Latin; also included in these books were the same printed images. While not the first compiler of emblems van Veen, added elements which further extended the popularity of the genre. The central message by van Veen, which was delivered by Cupid, was the supremacy of love and important of marriage and love. The composition of this piece also pulled from an emblem book, titled Emblematum liber by Andrea Alciato; specifically, the motto and printed image of In fidem uxorium (conjugal fidelity).

== Details ==
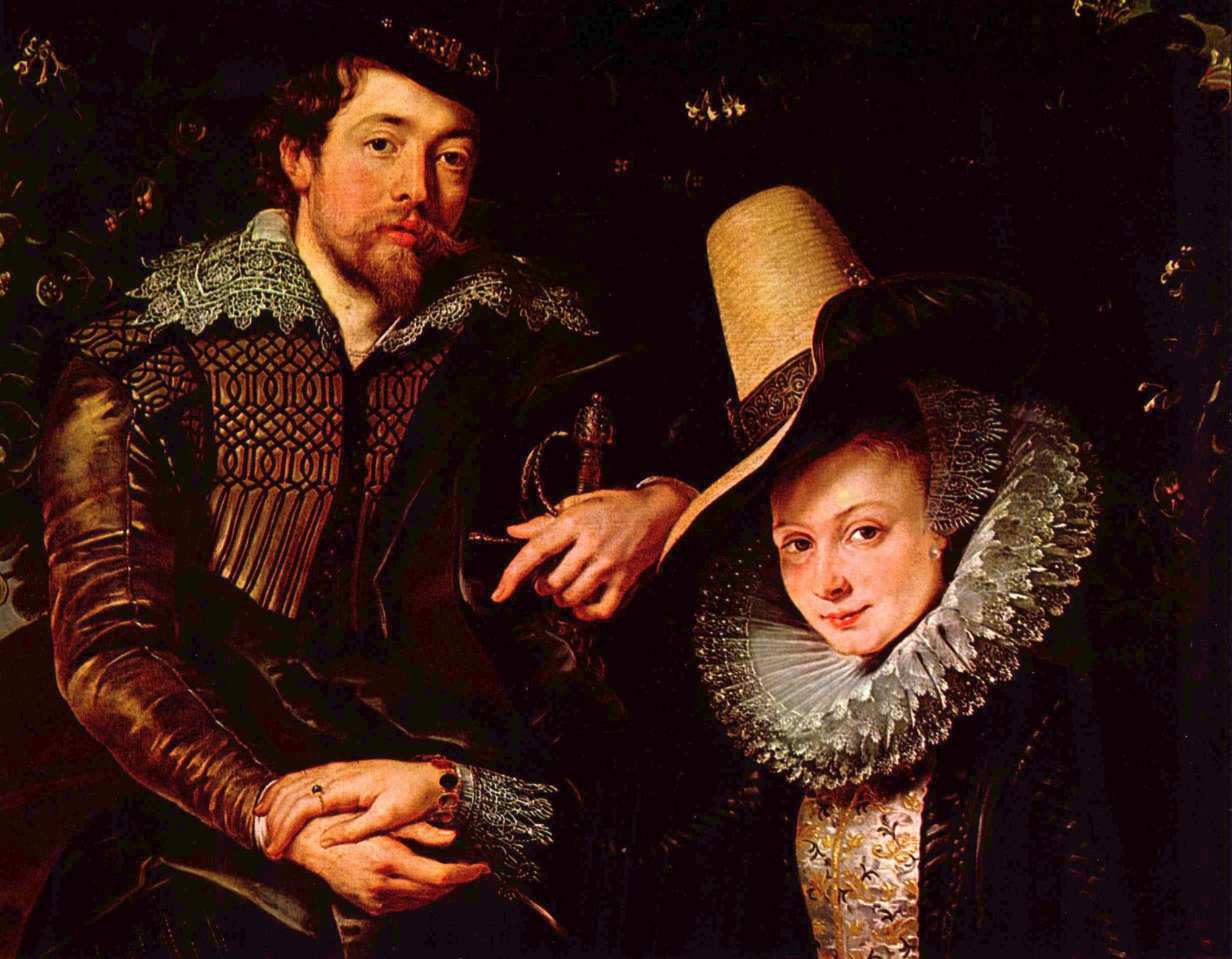
The couple, close-up

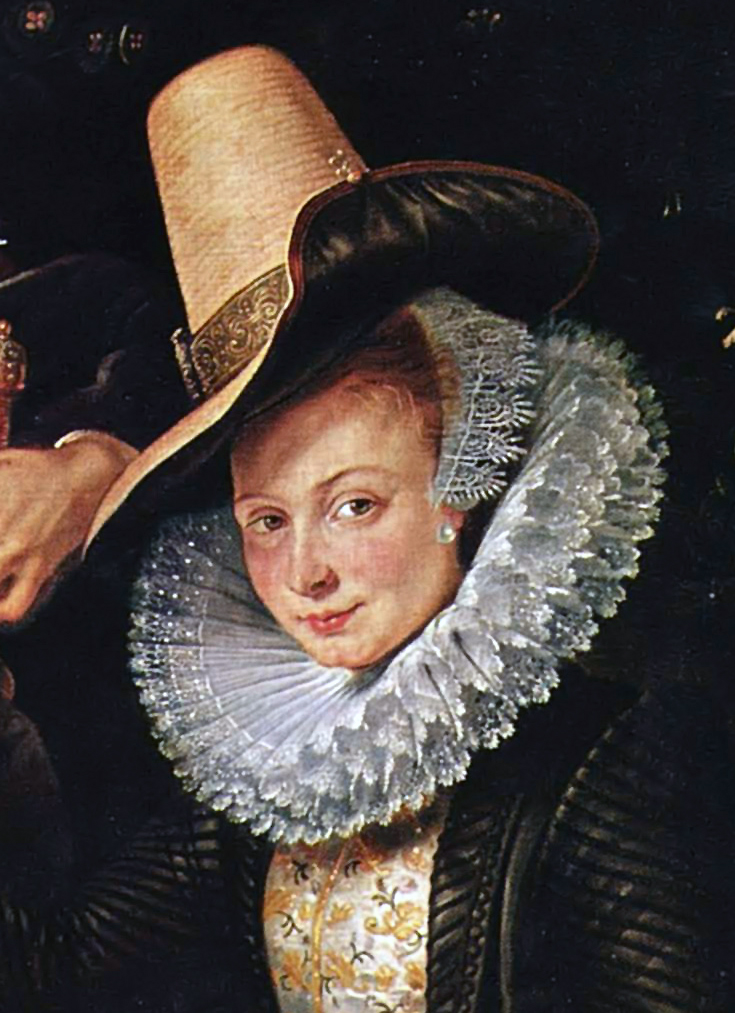
Isabella Brant close-up

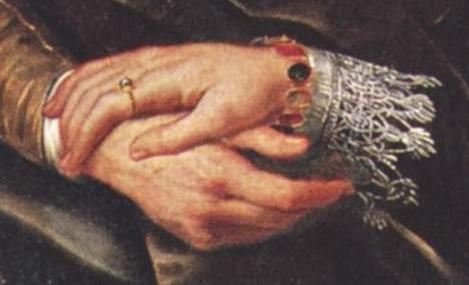
Detail of their hands

== Provenance ==
The artwork was given to Isabella Brant’s father, Jan Brant after the two married in 1609. Around the 18th century the painting ended up in the gallery collection of Johann Wilhelm II von der Pfalz in Düsseldorf. Later on, Honeysuckle Bower and other paintings by Rubens in the Düsseldorf Collection were given to the Alte Pinakothek museum in Munich as a form of inheritance in 1805.
