= Metrological Relief =

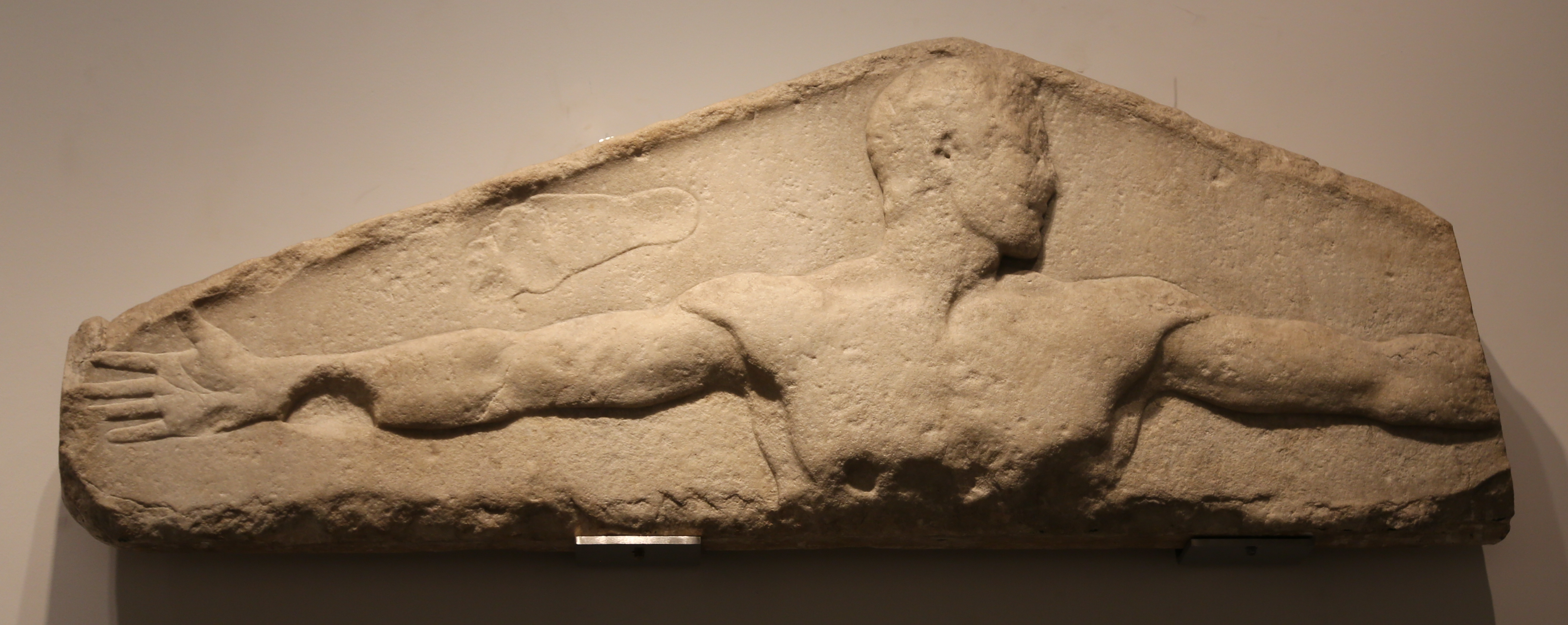
- Material: Marble
- Size: length: 2.09 meters height: 62 cm
- Created: 460–430 BC
- Discovered: 1625–26; Turkey or Greece
- Discovered by: William Petty
- Present location: Ashmolean Museum, Oxford, United Kingdom

The Metrological Relief is an Ancient Greek relief of a man with arms outstretched, cut with hammer and chisel on a triangular, marble slab between 460 and 430 BC.

It was found in Turkey or the Greek Islands in 1625–26 by a chaplain called William Petty collecting sculptures for Thomas Howard, Earl of Arundel. It was sold to Sir William Fermor in 1691 and then presented to Oxford University in 1755. It is now on display at the Ashmolean Museum in Oxford, United Kingdom. It was the only known metrological relief until 1988 when another was found on Salamis Island, Greece.

== Measurements ==
The relief measures 2.09 m long, 62 cm high, c. 10 cm thick and is broken over the figure's left forearm but when complete it measured one Greek fathom or orguia. There is also an image of a foot above the right forearm which measures 29.7 cm, an imprint of a clenched fist over the right forearm of 11 cm and fingers, which measure between 1.85 and 2 cm. Eric Fernie studied the relief and noted its ancient measurement of the Greek fathom.
