= Giulio Cesare Venenti =

Italian engraver (1642–1697)

Giulio Cesare Venenti (1609–1697) was an Italian engraver of the Baroque period. He was born in Bologna, where he first apprenticed under Francesco Brizio and Reni. He is best known for engravings of painters of Northern Italy including Parmigianino, Domenico Maria Canuti, and Annibale Carracci, including his landscapes.
