= Francesco Andreini (painter) =

Italian painter

Francesco Andreini (1697–1751) was a Rococo era painter from Cesena, Papal States. Two canvases by Andreini, depicting the Death of Nessus and the Rape (or abduction) of Europa, are displayed in the painting collection of the Circolo della Scranna, housed in the Palazzo Albicini in Forlì, Italy.
