= Jay Kappraff =

American mathematician

- Born: November 4, 1937; Bronx, New York, NY
- Died: January 22, 2024 (aged 86); Baltimore, MD
- Education: Brooklyn Polytechnic (B.Ch.E); Iowa State (M.S.); New York University (Ph.D.)
- Known for: mathematics of design
- Scientific career
- Workplaces: New Jersey Institute of Technology

Jay Kappraff was an American author and professor of mathematics at the New Jersey Institute of Technology.

== Biography ==
Kappraff was trained in engineering, physical sciences and mathematics, earning a B.Ch.E. in chemical engineering at New York Polytechnic in 1958. He went on to be awarded a PhD in applied mathematics in 1974 from the Courant Institute of Mathematical Science, New York University and a M.S. in chemical engineering in 1960 from Iowa State University. He began work for DuPont DeNemours as a chemical engineer from 1961 to 1962 going on to teach mathematics for a brief period before obtaining a position at NASA as an aerospace engineer from 1962 until 1965. He went on to be an instructor of mathematics at the Cooper Union College, New York City from 1968 until 1974.

Following this, he joined the New Jersey Institute of Technology, where he worked until his death. He was a consultant for the Department of Energy in 1976. In 1978, he developed a course in the mathematics of design for computer scientists, mathematicians and architects. In bringing together such an interdisciplinary range of subjects, he began to study what he termed a common language of design and geometry. He has been a lecturer on the relationship between art and science and published a large number or articles on subjects ranging from plasma physics, solar heating, aerospace engineering and fractals. He has also published a number of books on these and related subjects and compiled a series of video lectures on the science of design.

In 1991, his book Connections won a prize for the best book in chemistry, physics, mathematics, astronomy and reference from the Association of American Publishers.

At the NJIT, Kappraff has organized various forums and tuition programs on subjects from Nuclear war and ancient geometry to experimental mathematics. he was a member of the faculty council and chairman of the NJIT Technology and Society Forum committee. He is a member of the Mathematics Association of America and on the editorial board of a new interdisciplinary journal, the International Journal of Biological Systems.

== Selected bibliography ==
- Kappraff, J. "Geometric Foundations of Design: Old and New". World Scientific. (2021)
- Kappraff, J. "A Participatory Approach to Modern Geometry." World Scientific. (2014)
- Kappraff, J. "Beyond Measure." World Scientific. (2002)
- Kappraff, J. "Ancient Harmonic Law". Bridges 2007. (2007)
- Kappraff, J. and McClain, E.G. "The Proportions of the Parthenon: A work of musically inspired architecture". Music in Art: International Journal for Music Iconography, Vol. 30/1–2 (Spring–Fall 2005)
- Kappraff, J. and Adamson, G.W. Generalized Binet Formulas, Lucas Polynomials, and Cyclic Constants. FORMA vol. 19, No. 4 (2005)
- Kappraff, J. and Adamson, G.W. Polygons and Chaos. Journal of Biological Systems and Geometric Theories, Vol. 2 pp 79–94 (Nov. 2004).
- Kappraff, J. The Anatomy of a Bud. In Bridges:2004 edited by R. Sarhangi. Winfield, KS:Central Plains books (2004)
- Kappraff, J. and Adamson, G.W. The Relationship of the Cotangent Function to Special Relativity Theory, Silver Means, p-cycles, and Chaos Theory. FORMA. Vol.18, No. 3, pp 249–262 (2003)
- Kappraff, J. The Anatomy of a Bud. In Bridges:2004 edited by R. Sarhangi. Winfield, KS:Central Plains books (2004)
- Kappraff, J. and Adamson, G.W. Polygons and Chaos. Journal of Dynamical Systems and Geometric Theories, Vol. 2 pp 79–94 (Nov. 2004).
- Kappraff, J. and McClain, E. The System of Proportions of the Parthenon: A Work of Musically Inspired Architecture. Music in Art: International Journal of Music Iconography, Vol. 30 (2005), 5–16.
- Kappraff and Adamson, G.W. "Polygons and Chaos". Symmetry : Art and Science No. 1/2 (2001).
- Kappraff, J. "A Secret of Ancient Geometry." In Geometry at, Work edited by C.Gorini. Mathematics Association of American Geometry MAA Notes No. 53 (2000)
- Kappraff, J. "Systems of Proportion in Design and Architecture and their relationship to Dynamical Systems". In Visual Mathematics (an electronic journal). Issue 1. Feb. 1999.
- Kappraff, J., Blackmore, D., and Adamson, G. "Phyllotaxis asDynamical System: A Study in Number." In Symmetry in Plants edited by R.V. Jean and D. Barabe. Singapore: World Scientific. In print (1996).
- Kappraff, J. "Musical Proportions at the Basis of Architectural Proportions both Ancient and Modern." In Nexus '96 edited by K. Williams. Fuccechio: Edizioni Dell' Erba. In print (1996).
- Kappraff, J. "Linking the Musical Proportions of Renaissance, the Modulor, and Roman Systems of Proportions." Space Structures, Vol. 11, Nos. 1 and 2 (1996).
- Blackmore, D. and Kappraff, J. "Phyllotaxis and Toral Dynamical Systems." Journal of Applied Mathematics and Mechanics (1995).
- Kappraff, J. "Connections: The Geometric Bridge between Art and Science " 470 pages. New York: McGraw–Hill. 1991.
- Kappraff, J. "The Spiral in Myth, Mathematics, and Nature." In Spiral Symmetry edited by I. Hargittai and C.A. Pickover. Singapore:World Scientific. 1991.
- Kappraff, J. "A Course in the Mathematics of Design." In Symmetry:Unifying Human Understanding. Edited by I. Hargittai. Pergamon Press. 1986.
- Kappraff, J. "The Geometry of Coastlines: A study in Fractals." In Symmetry: Unifying Human Understanding edited by I. Hargittai. Pergamon Press. 1986.
