= Helena Arnell =

Finnish artist (1697–1751)

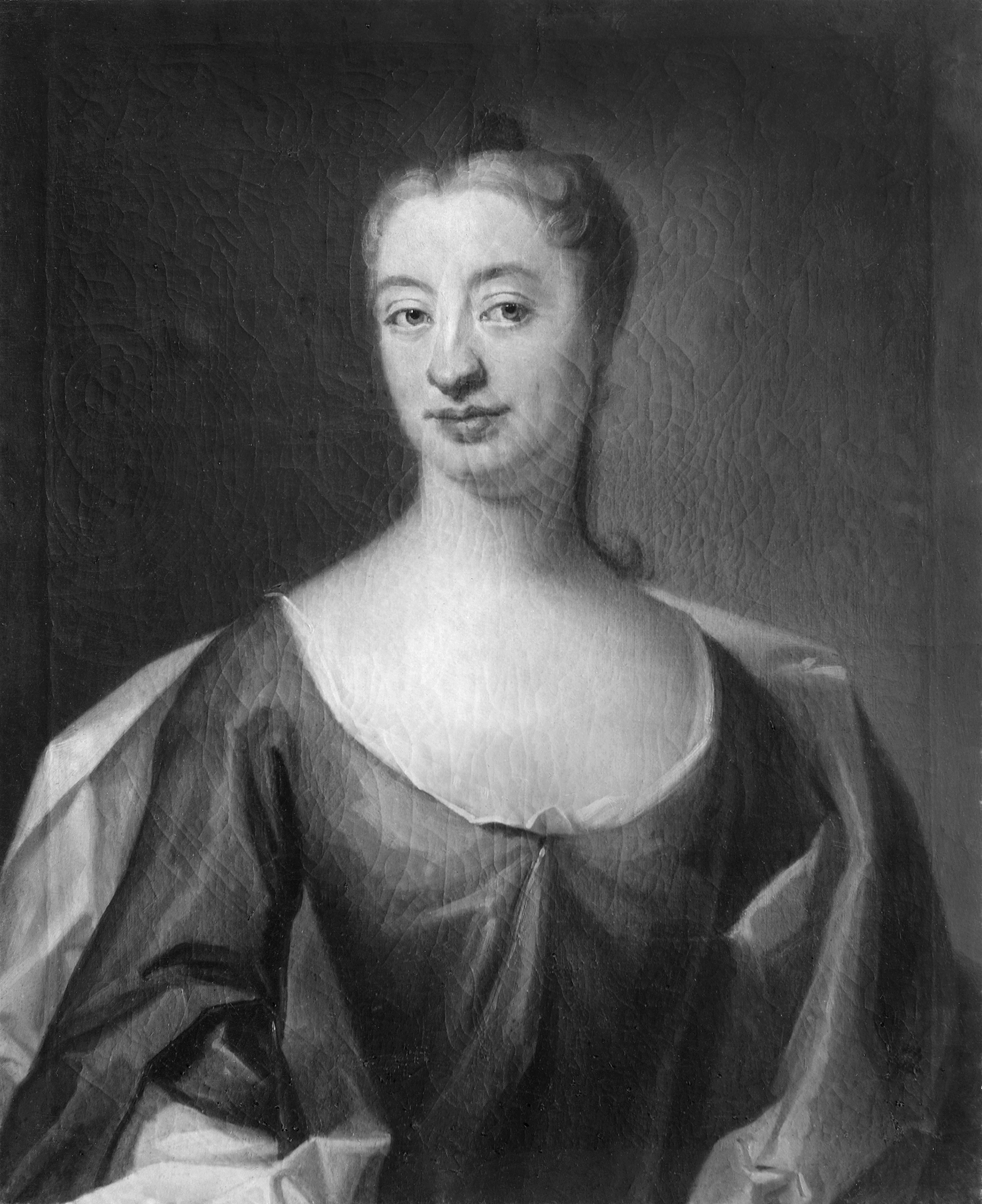
- Helena Arnell by Johan Henrik Scheffel in 1733
- Born: Helena Arnell-Gezelius; 1697; Stockholm, Sweden
- Died: 1 August 1751 (aged 53–54); Porvoo, Sweden (now Finland)
- Known for: Painting

Helena Arnell-Gezelius (1697 – 1 August 1751) was one of the first painters in Finland (then part of Sweden).

She was the daughter of a Swedish nobleman Jonas Lauréntii Arnell and Helena Adlerberg. In 1720, she married Johannes Gezelius the Youngest – doctor of theology and bishop of Porvoo. They had a son named Johan Gezelius (later Olivecreutz).

After her husband died in 1733, Helena moved to Sauvo.

== Works ==
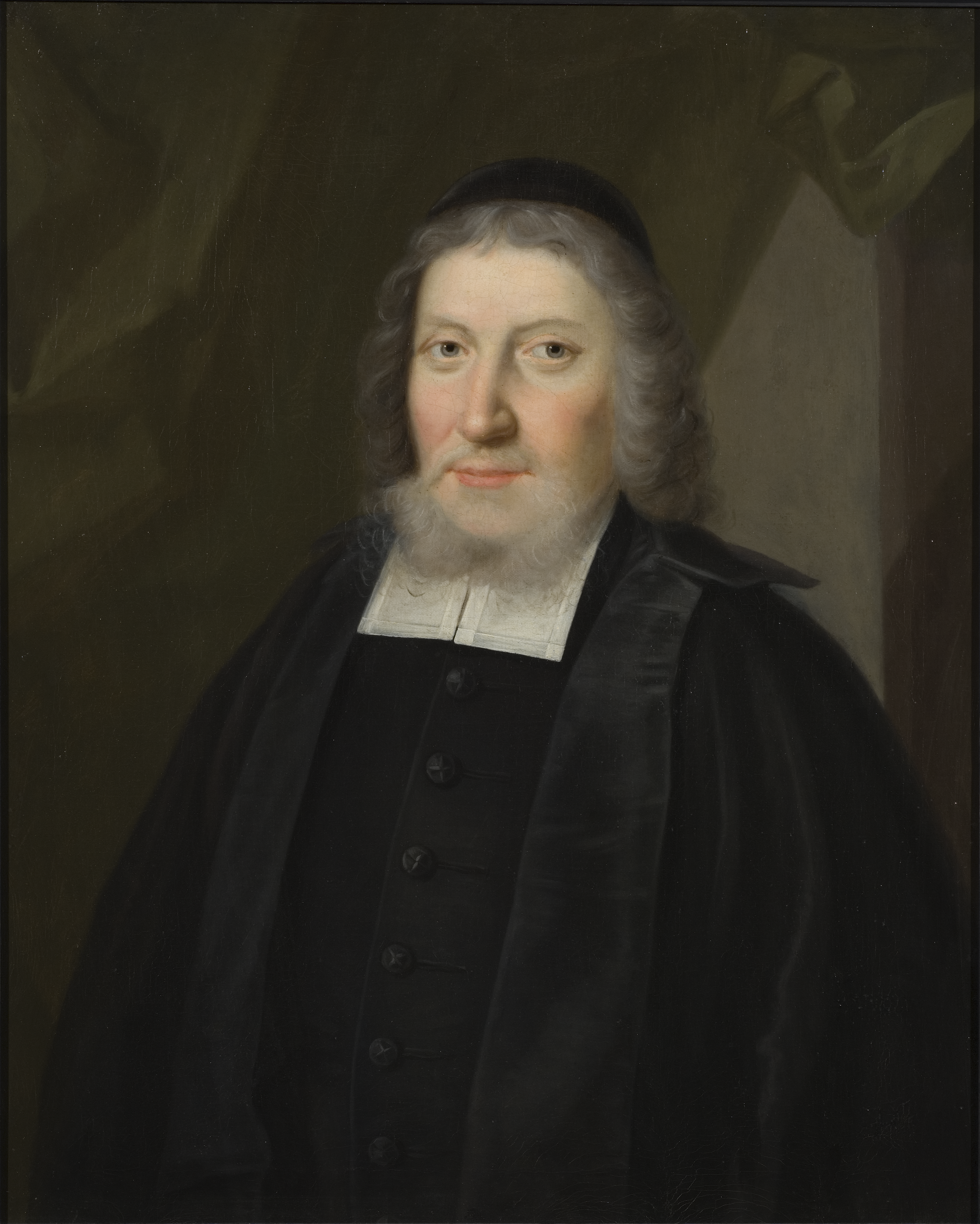
Portrait of Johannes Gezelius the younger

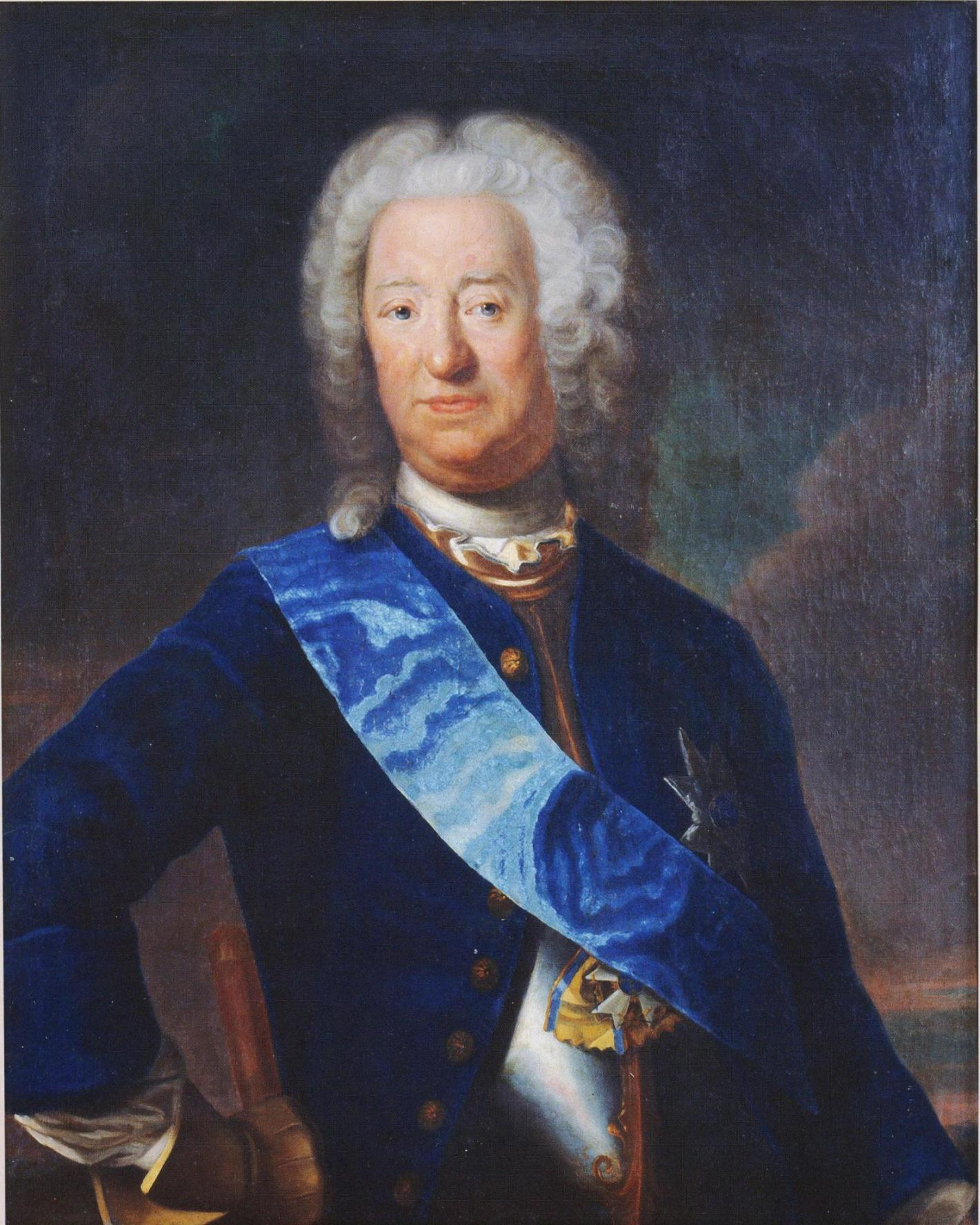
Portrait of Carl Olderman Cronstedt, 1740s
