= George Brookshaw =

English painter

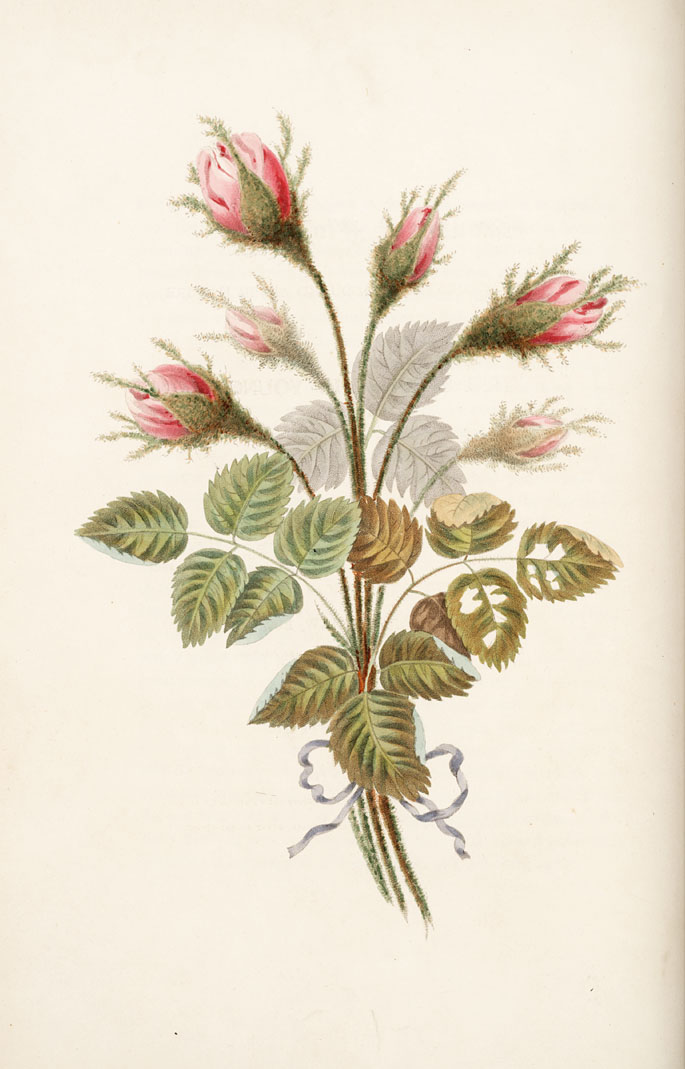
Moss Rose, 1817

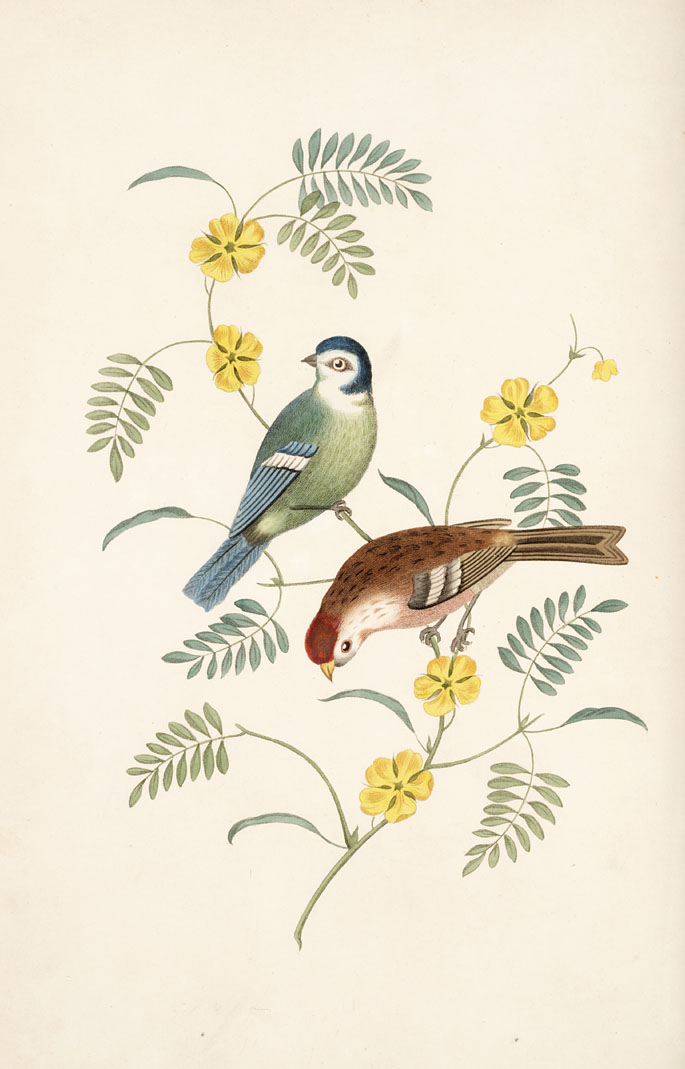
Blue Tit & Redpoll, 1817

George Brookshaw (c. 1751–1823), also known as G. Brown, was an English painter and illustrator from London.

His early career was spent as a London cabinet-maker specializing in painted furniture, often with floral decorations. Brookshaw also published supplementary drawing manuals on fruit, flowers, and birds. His books included A New Treatise on Flower Painting, or, Every Lady Her Own Drawing Master in 1818.

His 1812 book Pomona Britannica records and illustrates fruit varieties grown in the greenhouses and gardens of Kensington Palace and other famous places in England. The book is especially noteworthy for pineapples and cherries.

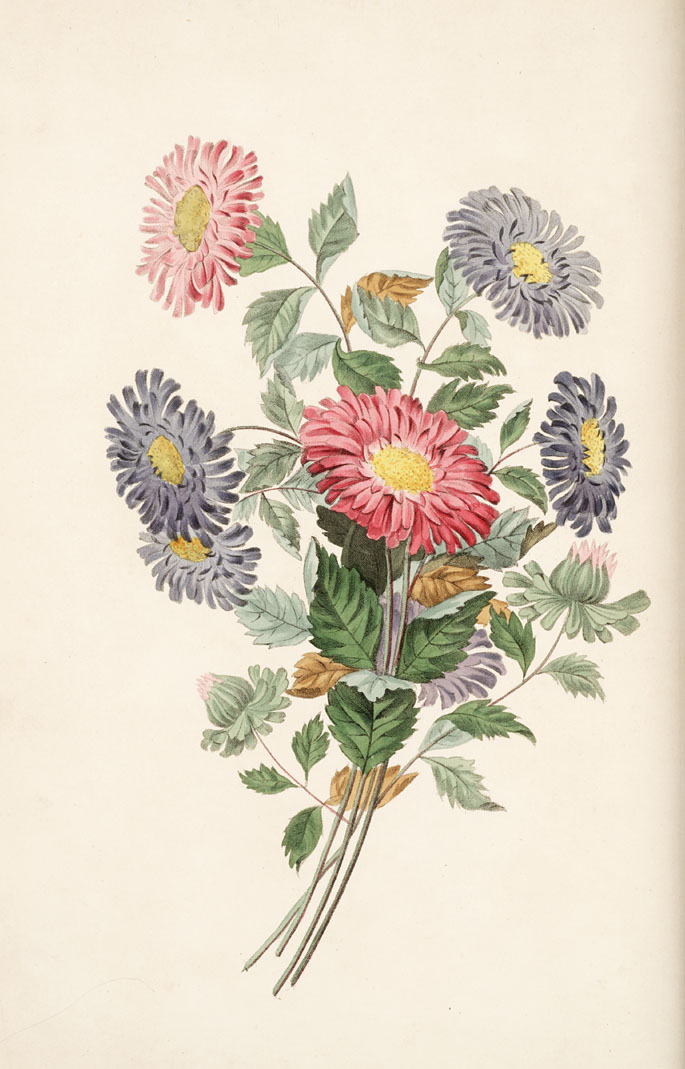
China Asters, 1817

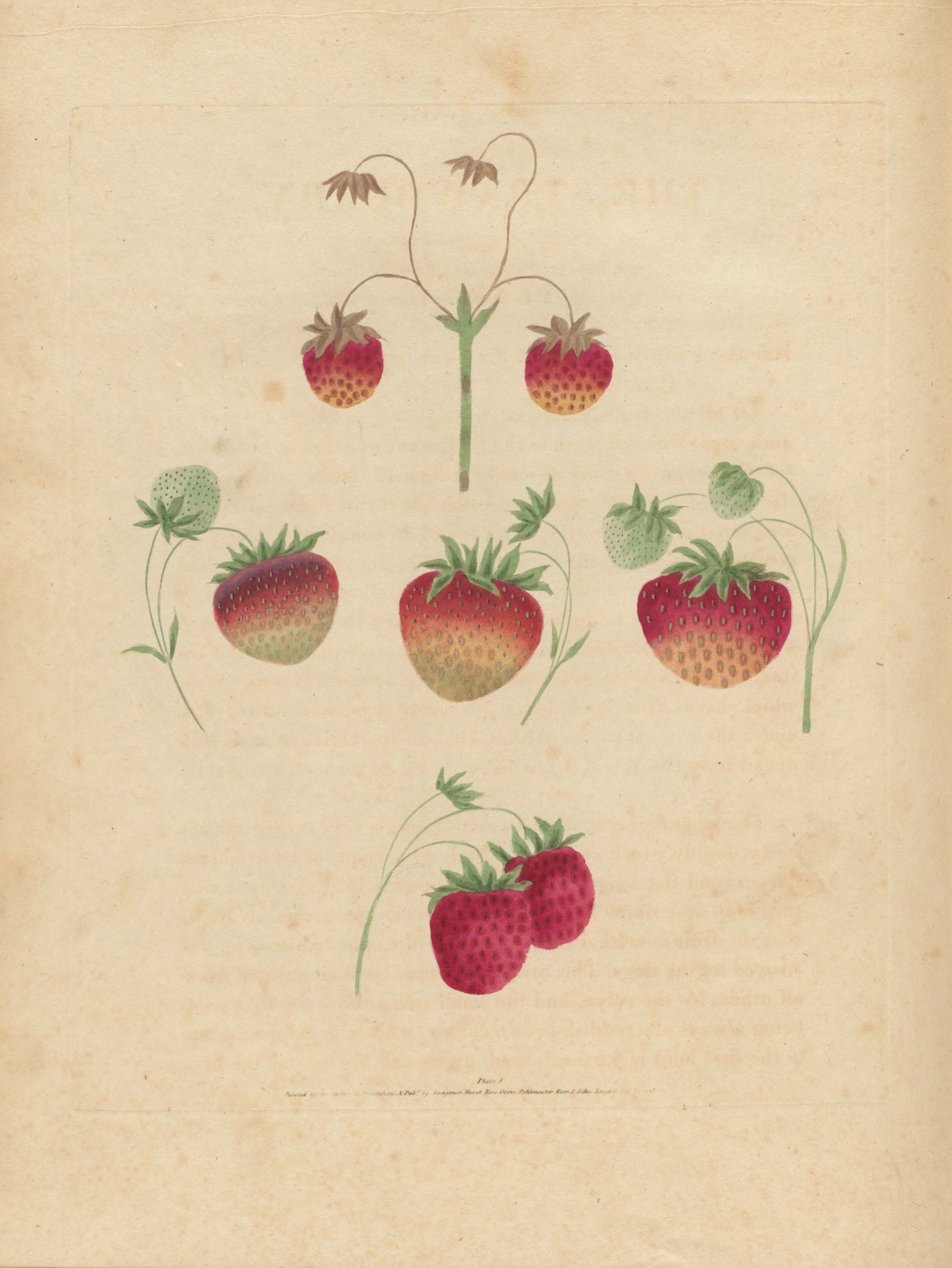
Strawberries, 1817.jpg
