= 1750 in art =

Events from the year 1750 in art.

== Events ==
- The Accademia di Belle Arti di Venezia is founded by the Venetian Senate as Venice’s school of painting, sculpture, and architecture, with Giovanni Battista Piazzetta as its first president.

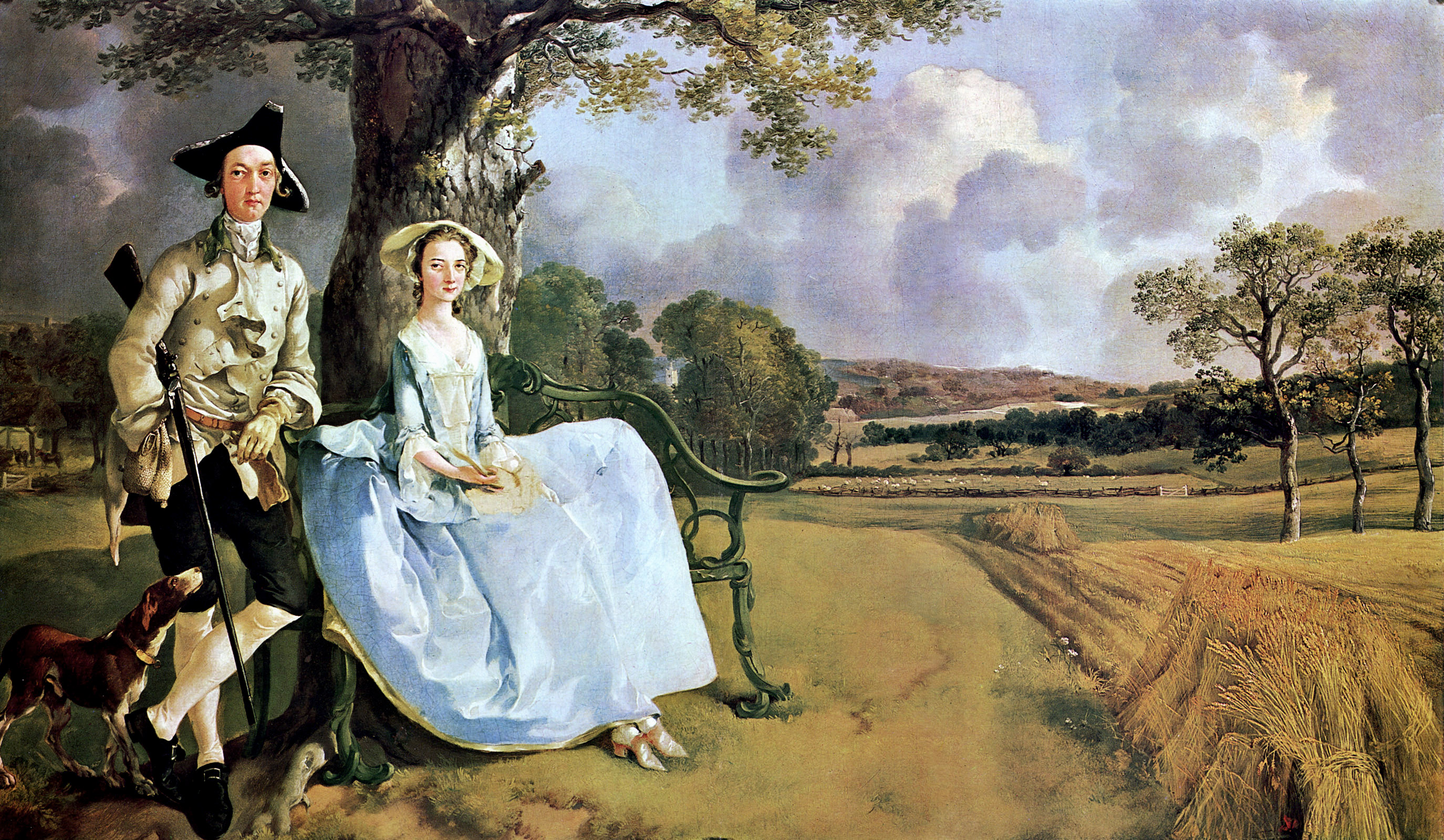
Gainsborough's portrait of Mr and Mrs Andrews

- Marcello Bacciarelli enters the service of Augustus, Elector of Saxony and King of Poland.

== Works ==
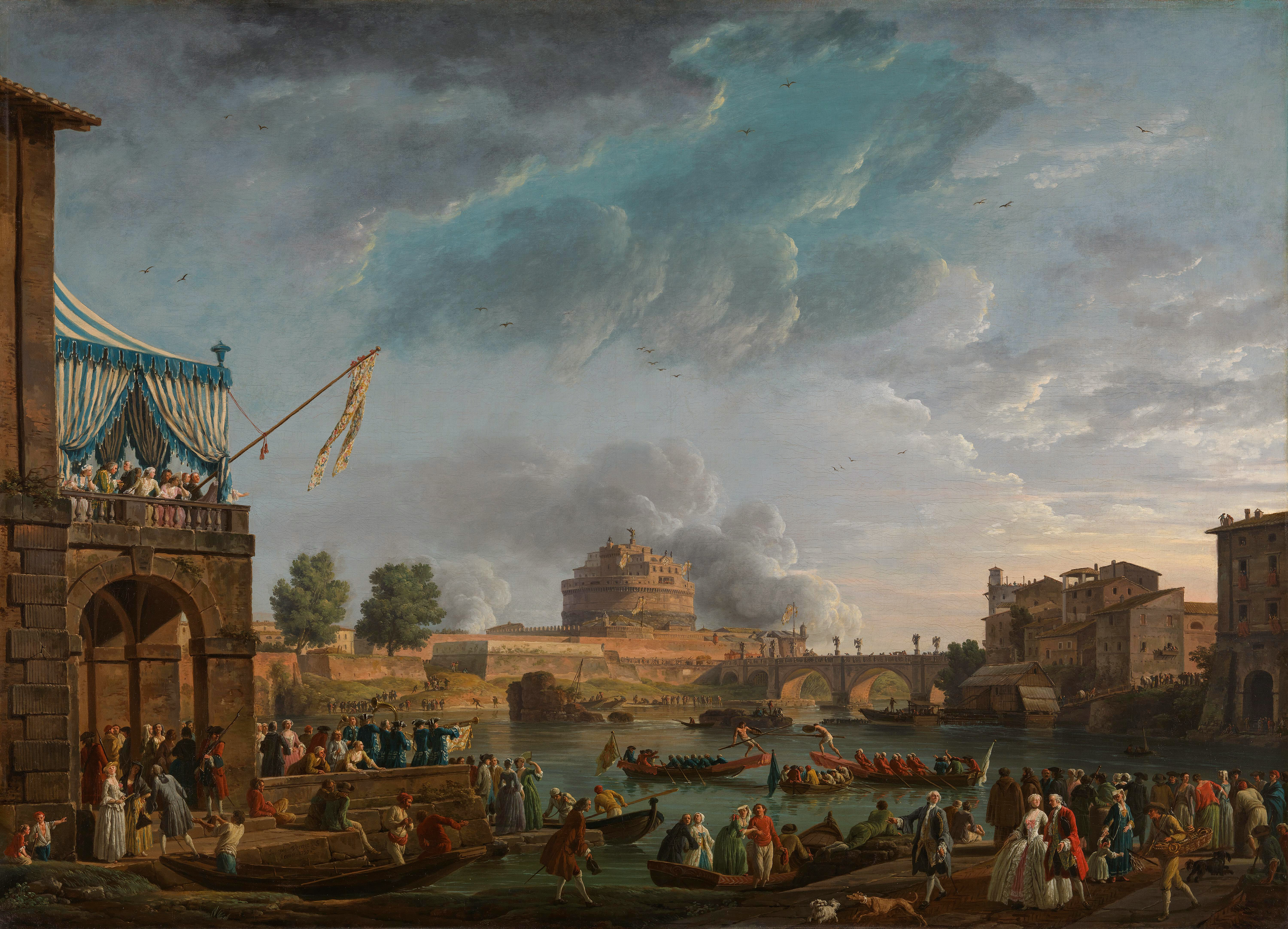
A Sporting Contest on the Tiber by Claude-Joseph Vernet.

- Jean Barbault paints Neapolitan Herder and a Cow leaving a Cave (Musée des Beaux-Arts de Strasbourg, France)
- Canaletto paints
  - Bacino di S. Marco: From the Piazzetta (National Gallery of Victoria, Melbourne, Australia)
  - Greenwich Hospital from the North Bank of the Thames
  - The Thames from the Terrace of Somerset House, Looking toward St. Paul's (Yale Center for British Art, New Haven, Connecticut)
  - A View of the Molo and the Riva degli Schiavone in Venice (Yale University Art Gallery, New Haven)
- Andrea Casali paints Lucretia (approximate date)
- Nihâl Chand paints Bani Thani (approximate date)
- Filippo della Valle carves the Annunziata bas-relief at Sant'Ignazio Church, Rome
- Georg Desmarées paints The Artist with his daughter Antonia (approximate date) and Portrait of Maria Rosa Walburga von Soyer
- Thomas Gainsborough
  - Holywells Park
  - Mr and Mrs Andrews
- William Hogarth paints the satirical The March of the Guards to Finchley
- Thomas Hudson – Portrait of William Shirley
- Maruyama Okyo paints The Ghost of Oyuki in ink on silk
- Samuel Scott – An Arch of Westminster Bridge
- Frans van der Mijn paints a portrait of the English politician, architect and collector Sir Thomas Robinson, 1st Baronet
- Claude Joseph Vernet
  - A Sporting Contest on the Tiber
  - a Times of Day series

== Births ==
- March 9 – Johann Friedrich August Tischbein (Leipziger Tischbein), German painter (died 1812)
- June 5 – Claude-Jean-Baptiste Hoin, French portrait and landscape painter (died 1817)
- July 21 – Daniel Caffé, German pastel painter of portraits (died 1850)
- October 30 – Jan Bulthuis, Dutch draftsman and painter (died 1801)
- December 6 – Pierre-Henri de Valenciennes, French painter (died 1819)
- December 8 – Giuseppe Cades, Italian sculptor, painter, and engraver (died 1799)
- date unknown
  - Luigi Agricola, Italian painter and jeweler (died 1821)
  - John Boyne, British water-colour painter (died 1810)
  - P. Jean-Baptiste Bradel, French draughtsman and engraver (died unknown)
  - Manuel de la Cruz, Spanish painter (died 1792)
  - John Downman, English portrait painter (died 1824)
  - George Engleheart, English painter of portrait miniatures (died 1829)
  - Ludwig Guttenbrunn, Austrian painter (died 1816)
  - Francesco Pozzi, Italian engraver (died 1805)
  - Samuel Shelley, English miniaturist and watercolour painter (died 1808)
  - Stefano Tofanelli, Italian painter during the Neoclassic period (died 1810)
  - François Marie Suzanne, French sculptor, who created a terracotta figure of Benjamin Franklin in 1793

== Deaths ==
- March 7 – Cornelis Troost, Dutch painter (born 1697)
- April - Guillaume Taraval, Swedish painter of French descent (born 1701)
- April 29 – Egid Quirin Asam, German plasterer and sculptor (born 1692)
- June 25 - Diego Francesco Carlone, Italian sculptor (born 1674)
- July 31 – Juste-Aurèle Meissonnier, French goldsmith, sculptor, painter, architect, and furniture designer (born 1695)
- August 12 – Rachel Ruysch, Dutch artist who specialized in still-life paintings of flowers (born 1664)
- August 20 – Nishikawa Sukenobu, Japanese ukiyo-e printmaker from Kyoto (born 1671)
- date unknown
  - Francesco Boccaccino, Italian painter, born at Cremona (born 1680)
  - Mattia Bortoloni, Italian Rococo painter (born 1696)
  - Leonardo Coccorante, Italian painter especially of large, highly detailed landscapes with imaginary classical architectural ruins (born 1680)
  - Antonio David, Italian portrait painter, especially of the House of Stuart (born 1698)
  - Jan Griffier II, English painter (born 1688)
  - Philipp Ferdinand de Hamilton, painter from the Southern Netherlands active in Austria (born 1664)
- probable – Robert Griffier, Dutch landscape painter (born 1688)
