= Manuel de la Cruz =

Manuel de la Cruz may refer to:

- Manuel de la Cruz (painter) (1750–1792), Spanish painter
- Manuel de la Cruz y Fernández (1861–1896), Cuban writer and journalist
