= Nihal Chand =

Nihal Chand may refer to:

- Nihâl Chand (1710–1782), Indian painter
- Nihalchand (born 1971), Indian politician
