= Johann George Tromlitz =

German flautist, flute maker, and composer (1725–1805)

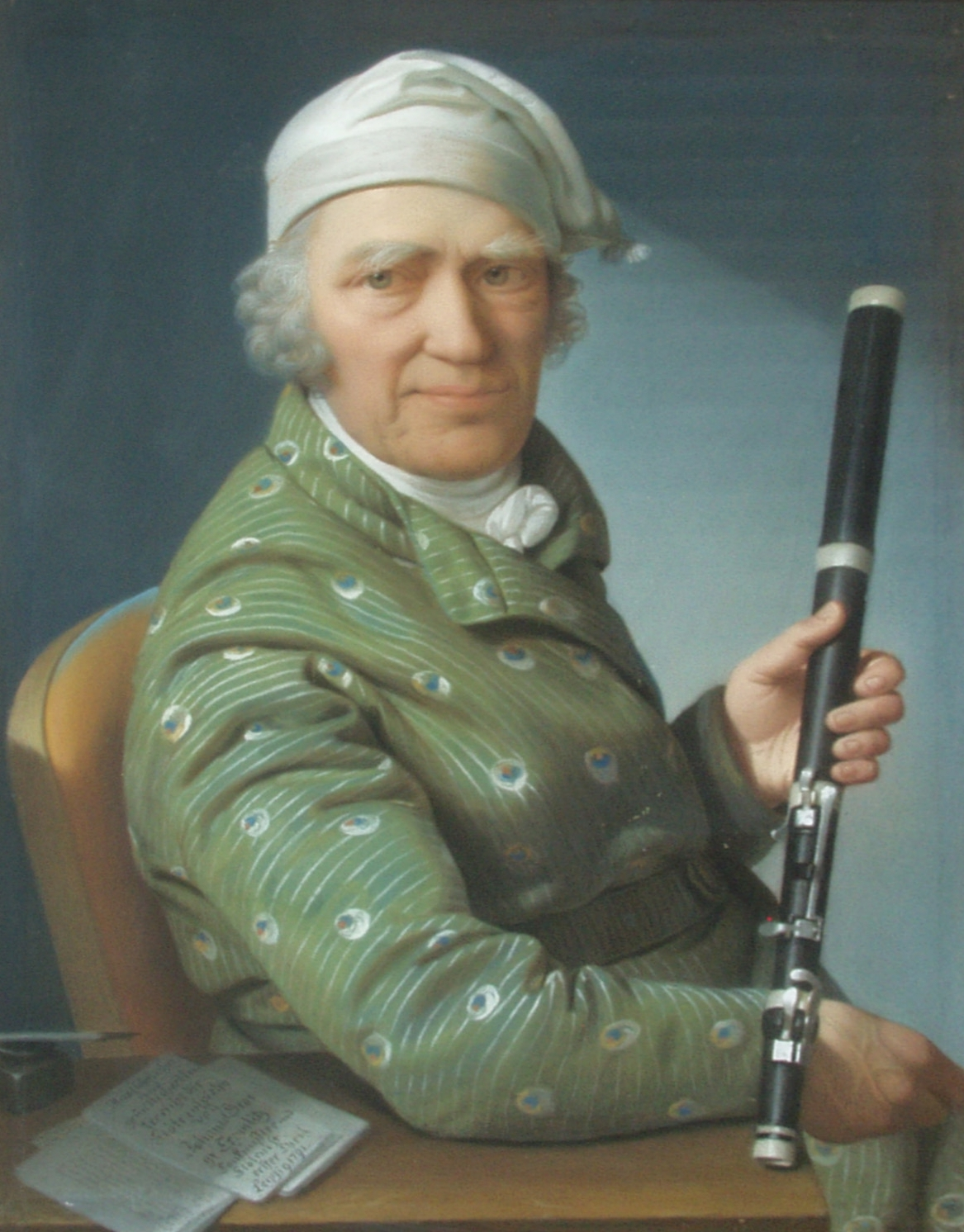
Johann George Tromlitz by Daniel Caffé, 1803

Johann George Tromlitz (November 8, 1725 – February 4, 1805), born at Reinsdorf, near Artern, Germany, was a flautist, flute maker and composer. He wrote three books on the art of flute playing.
