= John Boyne (artist) =

Irish water-colour painter

- Born: 1750-1759; County Down, Ireland
- Died: 22 June 1810; Penton Place, Pentonville, London

John Boyne (circa 1750 - 22 June 1810) was an Irish water-colour painter, engraver, and caricaturist.

== Life ==
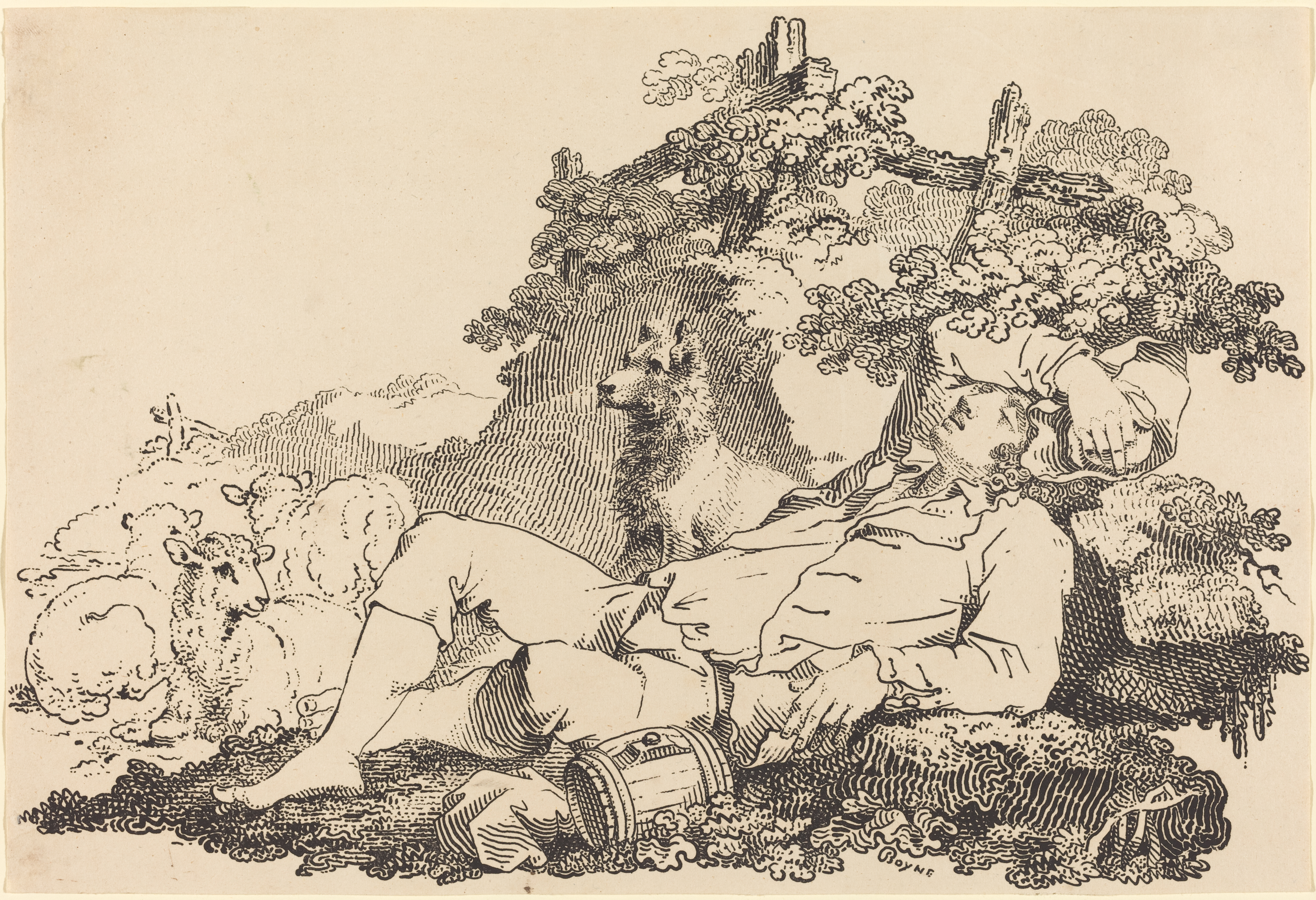
Shepherd with Dog and Sheep, lithograph, 1806

John Boyne born in the County Down about between 1750 and 1759. Boyne and his father moved to England when Boyne was 9 years old. He was apprenticed to William Byrne, the landscape engraver. Strickland claims that "owing to his idle and dissipated habits he was not successful" as an engraver.

He was a member of a group of strolling players for a time, before returning to London in 1781. There he took up a position as a master in a drawing school and returned to art practice. Between 1788 and 1809 he exhibited 18 figure subjects and caricatures with the Royal Academy. The British Museum hold 2 drawings by him from a series of heads from Shakespeare's players, "King Lear" and "The Quack Doctor". His "C. Macklin and Miss Pope as Shylock and Portia" was engraved by Nutter in 1790. The Royal Collection Trust hold a number of works by or after Boyne.

He died at his home at Penton Place, Pentonville on 22 June 1810.

== Selected works ==
- "Meeting of Connoisseurs" held in the V&A
- Banditti (1783)
- "General Blackbeard wounded at the battle of Leadenhall" (1784)
