= Daniel Caffé =

German painter

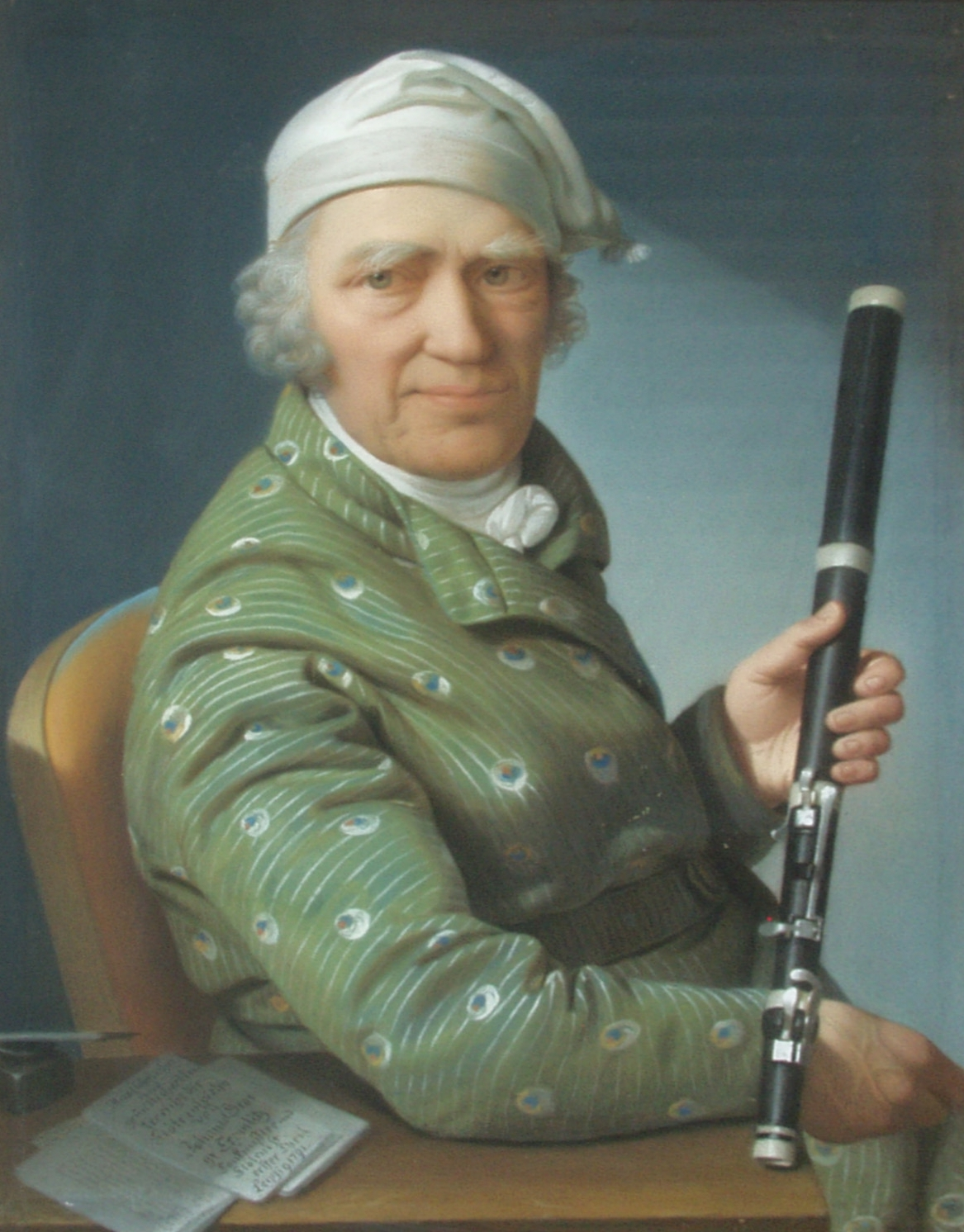
The flutist, flute maker and composer Johann George Tromlitz by Daniel Caffé, 1803

Daniel Caffé (21 July 1750 – 16 January 1815) was a German pastel painter of portraits.

Caffé was born in Küstrin, Kingdom of Prussia, and began his career as a painter of architectural decoration. He traveled to Dresden, where he became a portrait artist. In this way gained access into the Dresden Academy of Fine Arts under Casanova. He was influenced by the neoclassical work of Mengs. After ten years in Dresden, he moved to Leipzig. He was favored by requests from Russian patrons, including Prince Beloselski and Admiral Fyodor Grigoryevich Orloff. He was also known for copying works from Dresden Gallery.

He died in Leipzig, aged 64.

== See also ==
- List of German painters
