= Jean Barbault =

French painter

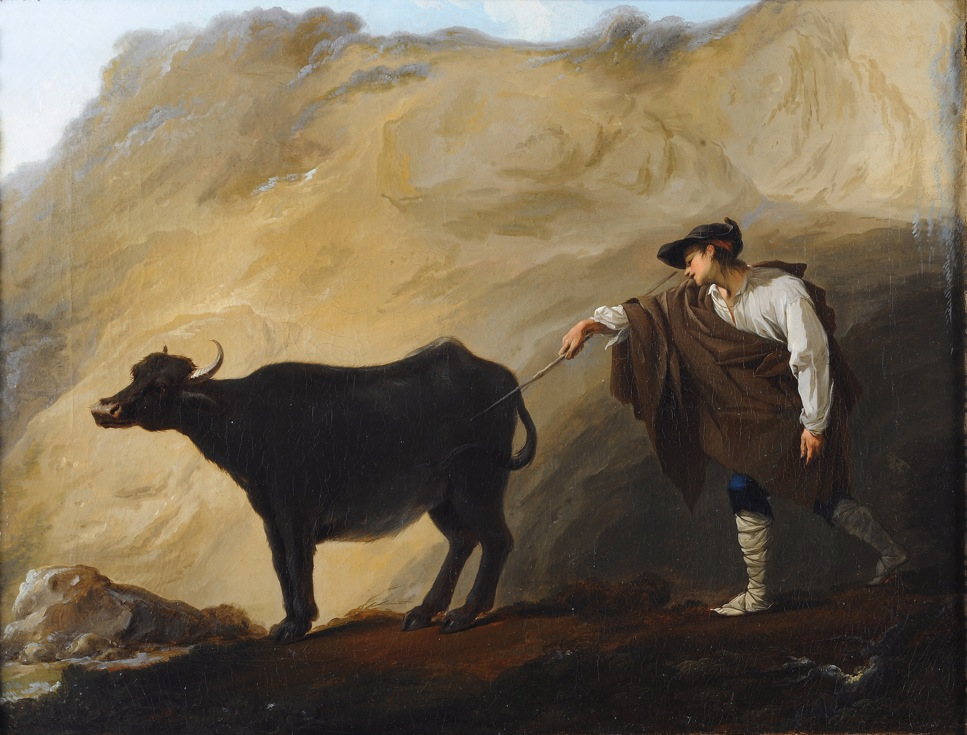
- Neapolitan Herder and a Cow leaving a Cave, (1750). Barbault modelled the herder on his own likeness
- Born: c. 1718; Viarmes, France
- Died: 1762; Rome, Italy
- Education: French Academy in Rome
- Known for: Painting, etching
- Notable work: Les Plus Beaux Monuments de Rome Ancienne, 1761
- Movement: Historical themes, Orientalist themes

Jean Barbault (c. 1718–1762) was a French painter, etcher and printmaker, who worked in Rome for most of his life. He is noted for paintings of local people, wearing traditional costumes or Oriental costumes and for his work documenting iconic Roman monuments and antiquities which were published in two volumes.

== Life and career ==
Jean Barbault was born in Viarmes, France in around 1718 and was a student of Jean Restout the Younger in Paris. Very little is known of his early life.

In 1745 he failed to win the Prix de Rome, but travelled to Rome in 1747 at his own expense and survived by undertaking engraving work. He spent most of his career in Italy, where he lived from around 1747. There, he was admitted to the French Academy in Rome in 1750. He was a "disciple of Piranesi" and "was fascinated by Rome's sprawling Baroque thoroughfares". In 1748, he made engravings for the Varie vedute di Roma antica e moderna published in Rome.

Many of his works are small paintings depicting individual figures, either Italian women, or his fellow artists. He notably executed a series of sketches and paintings of French artists who participated in the Turkish mascarade organized in 1748 to mark the Carnival of the French Academy in Rome. For the Carnival, Barbault himself dressed as an Officer of the Sultan's Guards. Some twenty works made up the series, of which the painting, The Greek Sultana, originates. In these works, painters are represented wearing fantastical "Oriental" costumes which were very much in vogue during the mid-18th century. In this regard, Barbault became one of the earliest proponents of the representation of traditional costume, a custom that became fashionable and was emulated by many later French artists.

One of his larger works in oil on paper – almost four metres wide – depicts a group of artists taking part in a carnival procession entitled The Four Corners of the World (1751). It now forms part of the collection of the Musée des Beaux-Arts et d’Archéologie at Besançon. He also painted scenes of ruins in a style similar that of Servandoni.

Certain art historians believe that Barbault based the figure in the painting, Neapolitan Shepherd and Buffalo Leaving a Cave on himself. It is very similar in attitude and appearance to a figure that appears on the far right of The Four Corners of the World which is also believed to be based on a likeness of the artist.

As a painter, Barbault has never been well known, and has been described as a "minor talent." He is perhaps better known for his etchings, especially the two sets of prints he published, namely: Monuments de Rome ancienne and Rome Moderne, both published in folio form. He also made a few engravings, including The Martyrdom of St. Peter, after Subleyras, and The Arrival of Columbus in America, after Solimena.

He died in Rome in 1762, at the age of 43 leaving a widow and three children.

An exhibition of his work was held in Beauvais, touring to Angers, Valence and Dijon, in 1974–75; another, which included about half of his known paintings, was staged at the Musée des Beaux-Arts in Strasbourg in 2010.

== Work ==
Barbault not only produced individual paintings, engravings and sketches, but he also worked as an illustrator and published two folios of etchings documenting iconic Roman monuments and antiquities.

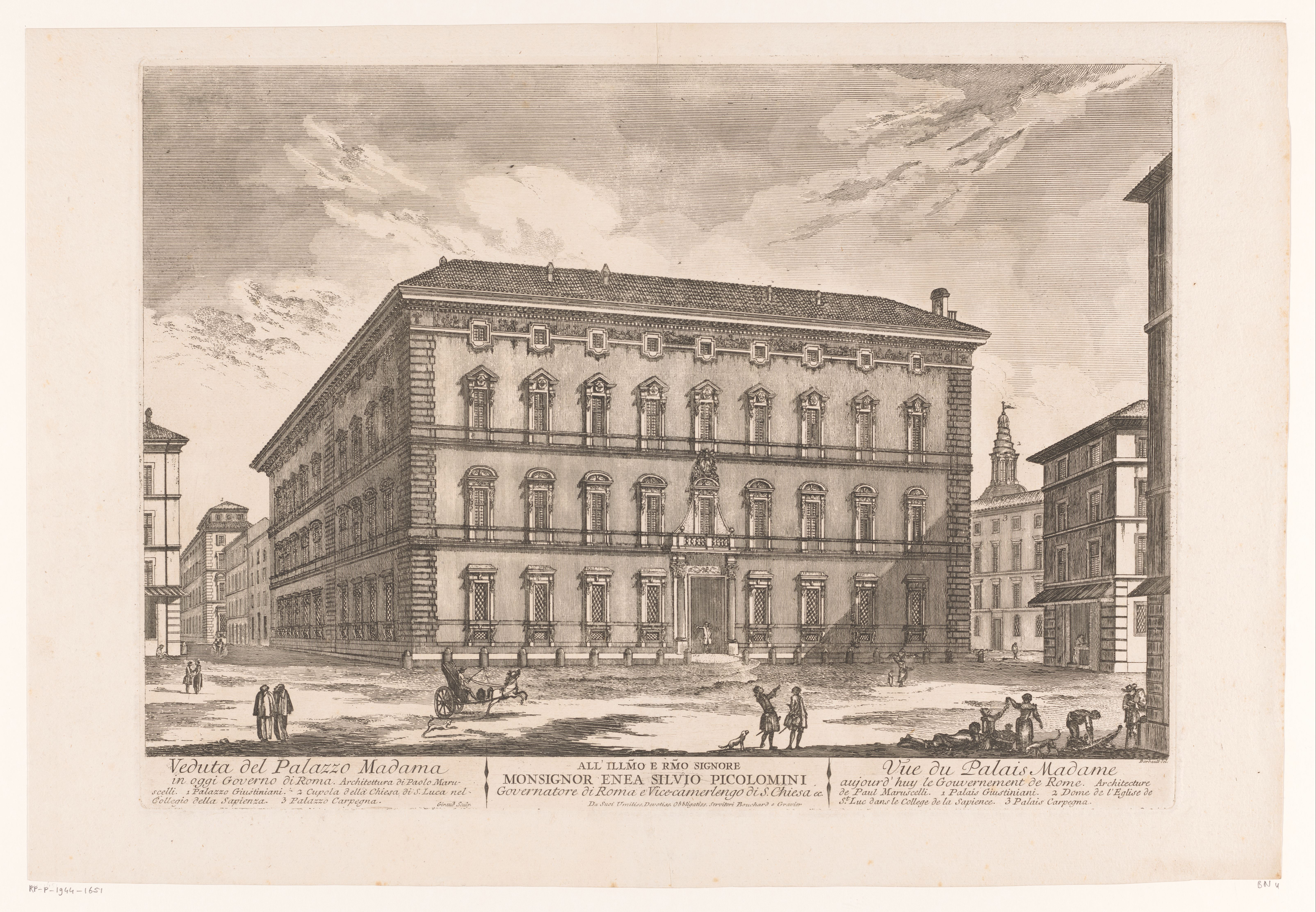
Gezicht op het Palazzo Madama, Rome, drawing by Jean Barbault, 1763

=== Publications ===
- Les Plus Beaux Monuments de Rome Ancienne ou Recueil des plus beaux Morceaux de l'Antiquité Romaine qui existent encore, Bouchard et Gravier, Rome, 1761 [Series of 128 engravings designed by Barbault with etchings by Jean Barbault, Carlo Nolli (1724–c. 1770) and Leonardo di Giovanni Pietro Bufalini (c. 1486–1552), doi:10.3931/e-rara-79835 (Digitized edition at E-rara).
- Les Plus Beaux Edifices de Rome Moderne, 1763 [Published posthumously]

=== Painting and etching ===
- The Painter Clément in Turkish Costume, 1748, red chalk, private collection
- The Greek Sultana, 1748
- Temple Priest, 1748
- Neapolitan Herder and a Cow leaving a Cave, circa 1750, oil on canvas, Musée des Beaux-Arts, Strasbourg
- Ruins with Pyramids, 1754
- Peasant Woman of Frascati, 1762, oil on canvas
- La Vénitienne, date unknown
- Self-portrait, date unknown, Cini collection, Venice
- Two small paintings of Roman Ruins, Museum Cerralbo, Madrid.

=== Gallery ===
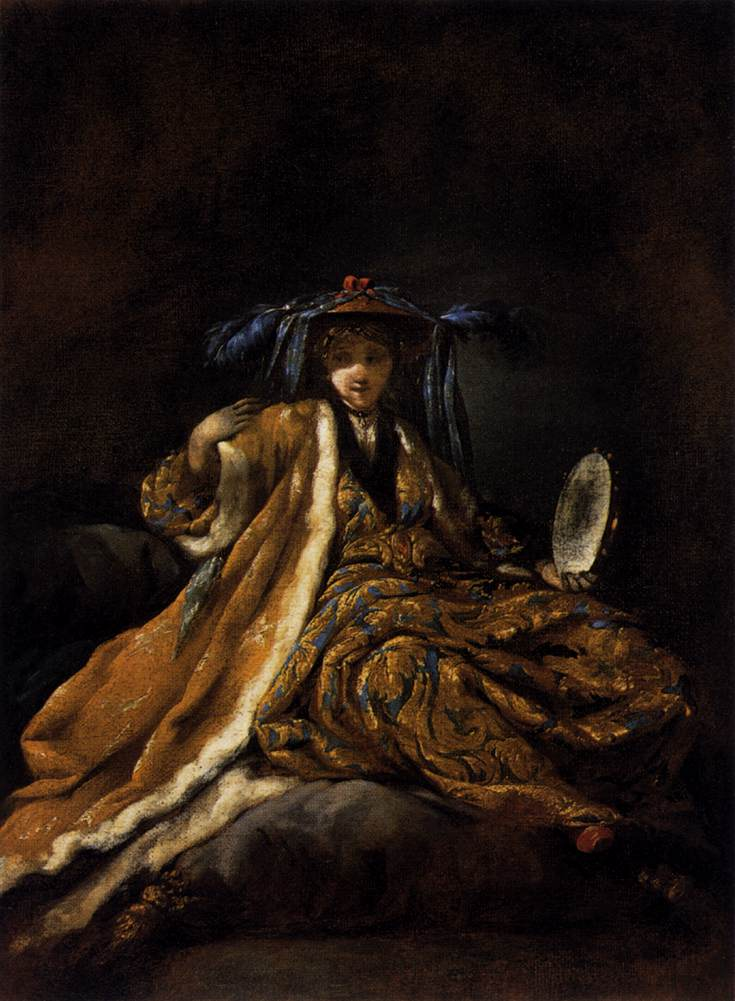
Greek Sultana, 1748

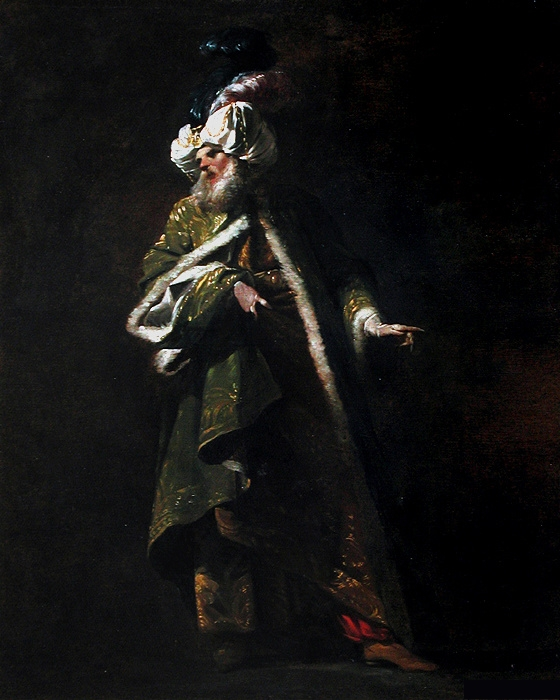
Temple Priest, 1748, Louvre

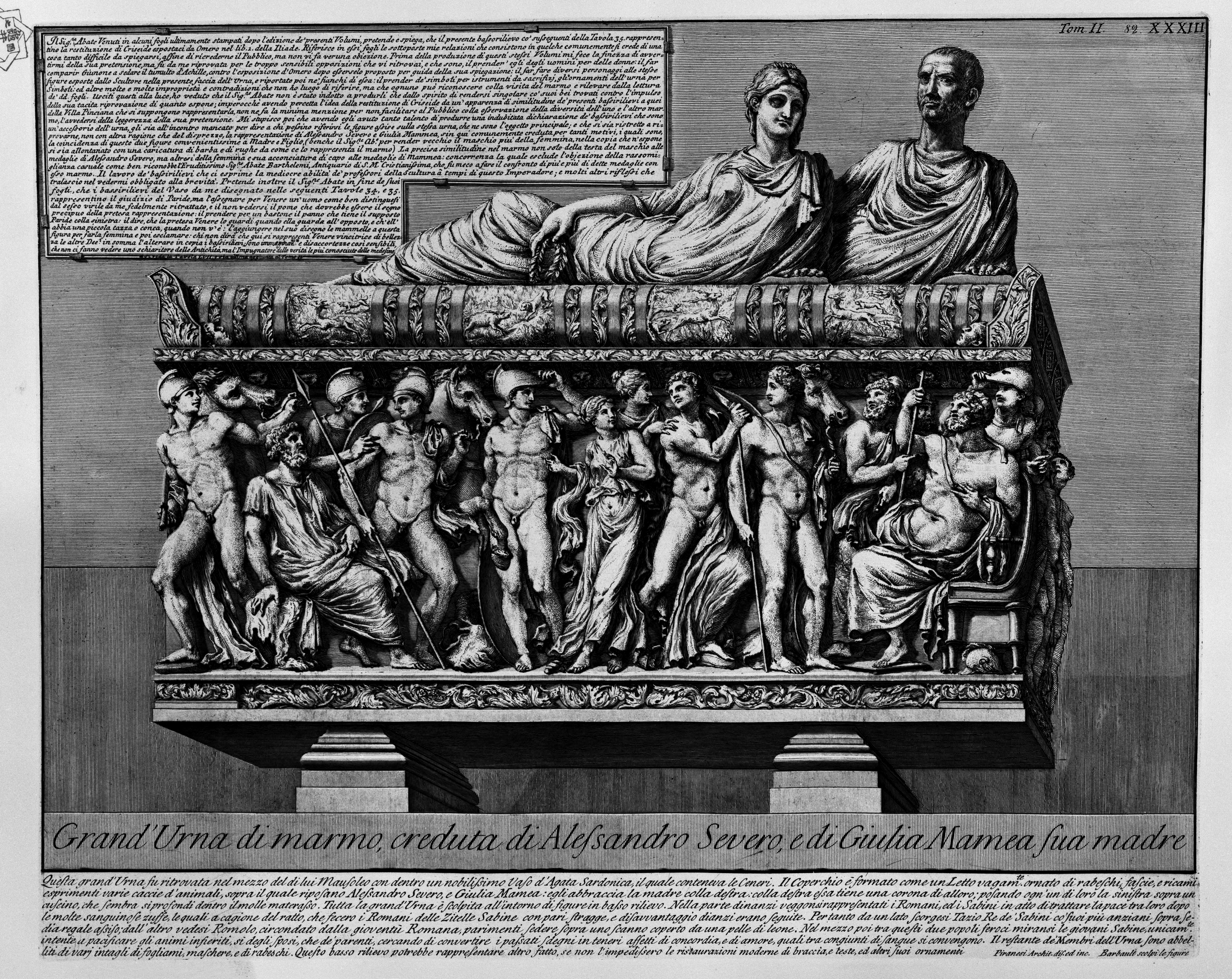
Sarcophagus of Alexander Severus and Julia Mamaea from Monte del Grano, etching, 1756

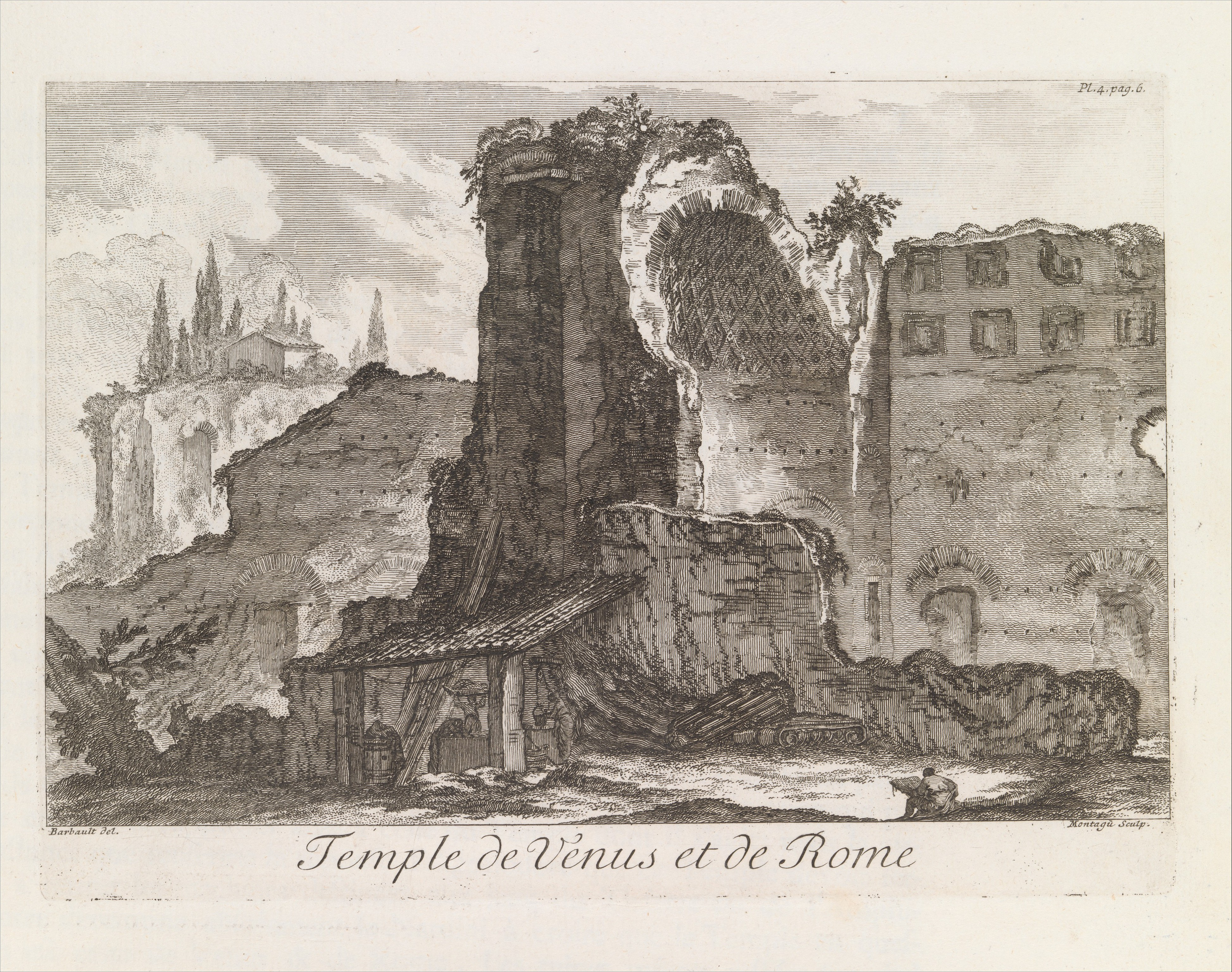
Temple de Venus et de Rome, from Les Plus Beaux Monuments de Rome Ancienne 1761

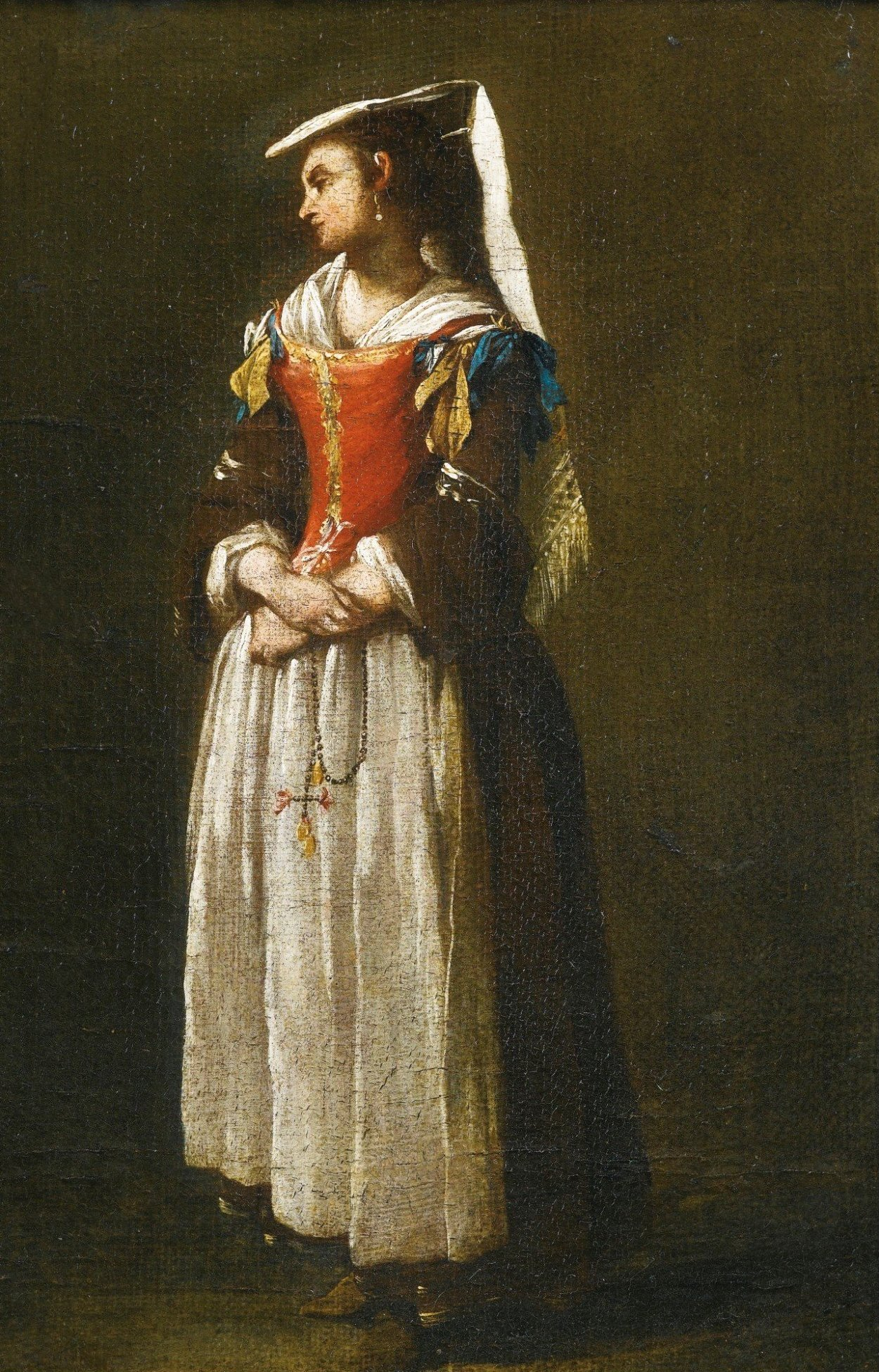
A Young Woman Dressed in Neapolitan Fashion, undated

== See also ==
- List of Orientalist artists
- Orientalism
