= P. Jean-Baptiste Bradel =

French draughtsman and engraver

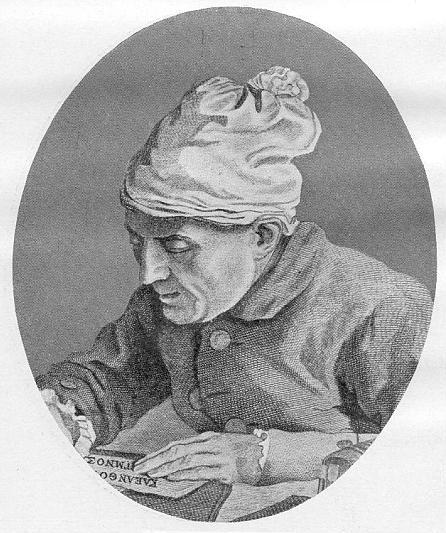
Portrait of Richard François Philippe Brunck, from the Cabinet des estampes et des dessins (Strasbourg).

P. Jean-Baptiste Bradel, a French draughtsman and engraver, was born in Paris about 1750. He was chiefly employed in engraving portraits, which are neatly executed, and which include the following plates:

- Pope Benedict XIV.
- Pope Clement XIV.
- Madame Louise, of France.
- Louis François Gabriel de la Motte, Bishop of Amiens.
- General Paoli.
- Prosper Jean de Crébillon.
- Jean Bart, Admiral.
- The Chevalier d'Eon.
- An allegorical subject; inscribed Trinus et unus.
- A Boy playing on the Tambour de Basque.
