= Bani Thani =

Singer and poet from 18th century Rajasthan

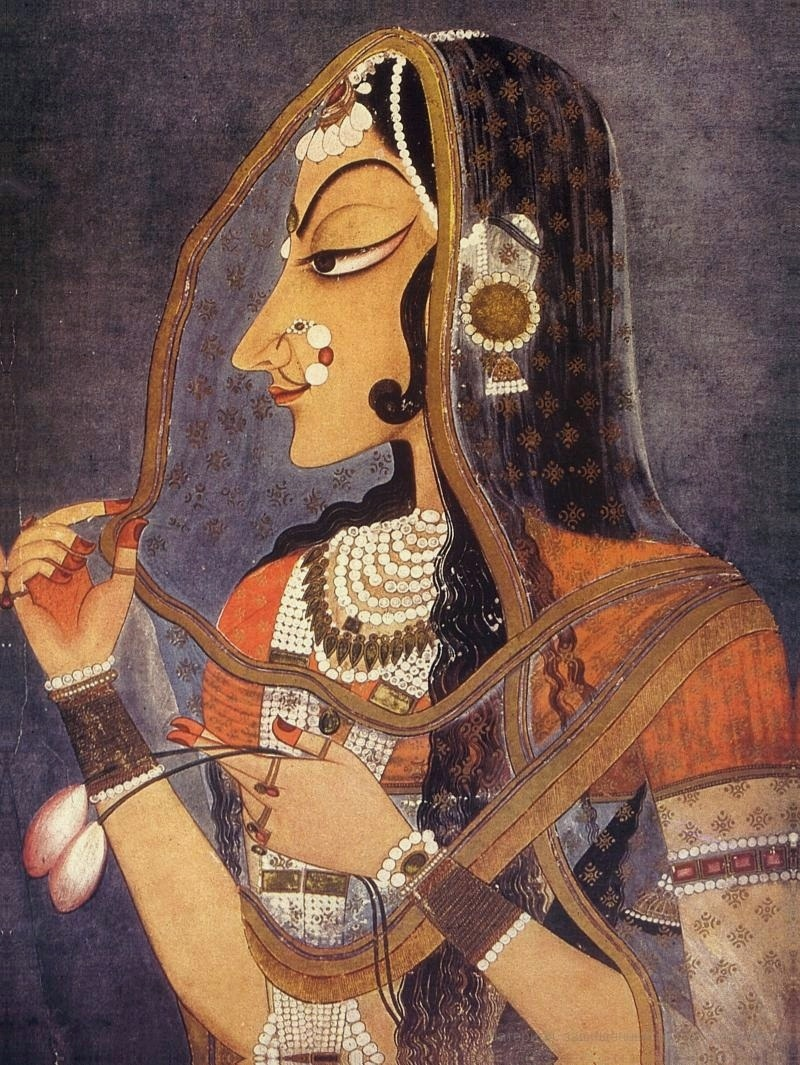
Bani Thani, Kishangarh miniature from c. 1750, at the National Museum, New Delhi.

Bani Thani was a singer and poet in Kishangarh (then part of Rajputana) in the time of Raja Sawant Singh (1748–1764), whose mistress she became. After he abdicated the throne the couple retired to a comfortable life in Vrindavan, a place associated with the life of Krishna and Radha, to whom Sawant Singh was greatly devoted. A group of Indian paintings of around 1750 attributed to Nihâl Chand from the Marwar school of Kishangarh show Radha Krishna, using the same models, who are assumed to be Sawant Singh and Bani Thani.

Bani Thani is depicted with elegant and graceful features, rather stylized, including arched eyebrows, lotus-like elongated eyes and pointed chin. One painting of her was featured in an Indian stamp issued on 5 May 1973.

== Biography ==
Bani Thani was believed to be the mistress of King Sawant Singh, and later became one of his wives. Her birth name was Vishnupriya. She was a singer employed by his stepmother and he was drawn to her because of her beauty and singing. She came to be known as 'Bani Thani', which means "the decked out lady", because of the exquisite jewellery and makeup that she used to adorn herself with after becoming queen. He also wrote poetry for her under the pen name of Nagari Das. Their love bloomed due to a shared interest in singing, poetry and devotion for Krishna. She also wrote poetry under the pen name of Mrs.Rasikbihari. Later, he commissioned his artists to depict their relationship in a way similar to the love between Radha and Krishna. Both lovers died in the 1760s. They have twin chhatris dedicated to them near the Nagari Kunj temple.

== Style and theme ==
The Kishangarh school of art is notable for its elongated style, with "arched eyebrows, lotus-like elongated eyes and pointed chin" a highly idealized facial form reminiscent of Indian sculpture art. Kishangarh was influenced by Būndī painting in its use of lush vegetation, dramatic night skies, vivid movement and Mughal painting in its use of side-profile portraits, though it can be distinguished from both of them due to its extremely meticulous details, rich colours and fine technique. The patron-king Savant Singh was a member of the Vallabhācārya sect devoted to Krishna, due to which religiously themed paintings flourished in the court under his patronage. The paintings of Kishangarh school are characterised by a religious fervour and this might have been the reason why the portraiture of the queen was compared to, and is believed to have been inspired by, the figure of Radha.

== The Sringara-rasa Nayika ==
Within the Ashta Nayika classification system of heroines, the Bani Thani is identified as the Vasakasajja Nayika type, with the element of Sringara rasa (romantic love) predominating. Hence, the painting conveys the passionate and romantic elements of the legend. She has been portrayed with all the elements of Sringara and exaggerated facial features which are unrealistic but striking. This style of portraiture later became the standard of beauty in all the later paintings of the Kishangarh school.

== Images ==
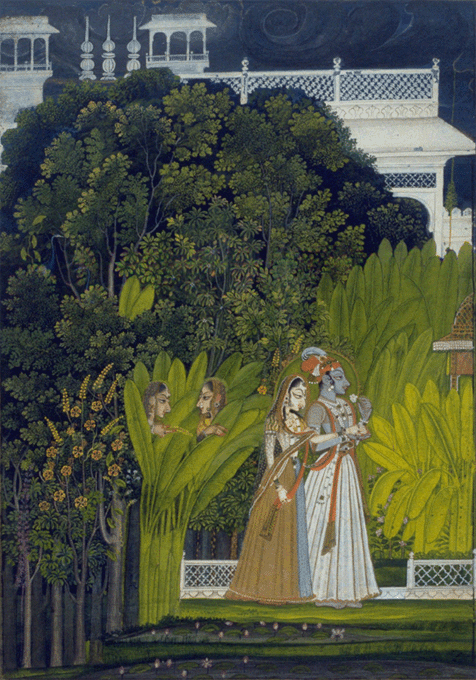
Raja Savant Singh and Bani Thani as Krishna and Radha, ca. 1760.

Radha and Krishna in the boat of love

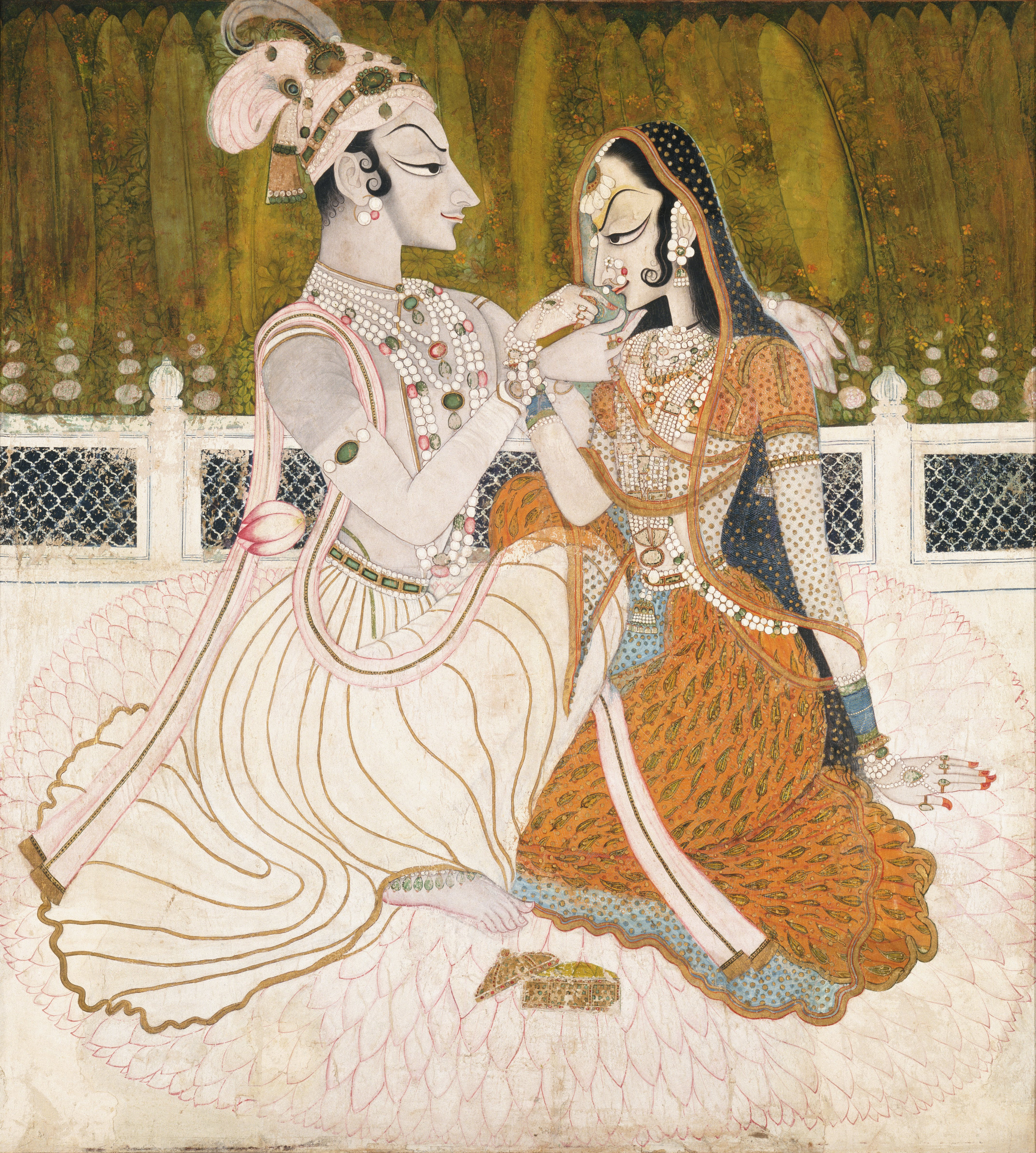
Krishna and Radha, Opaque watercolor and gold on cotton, ca 1750.

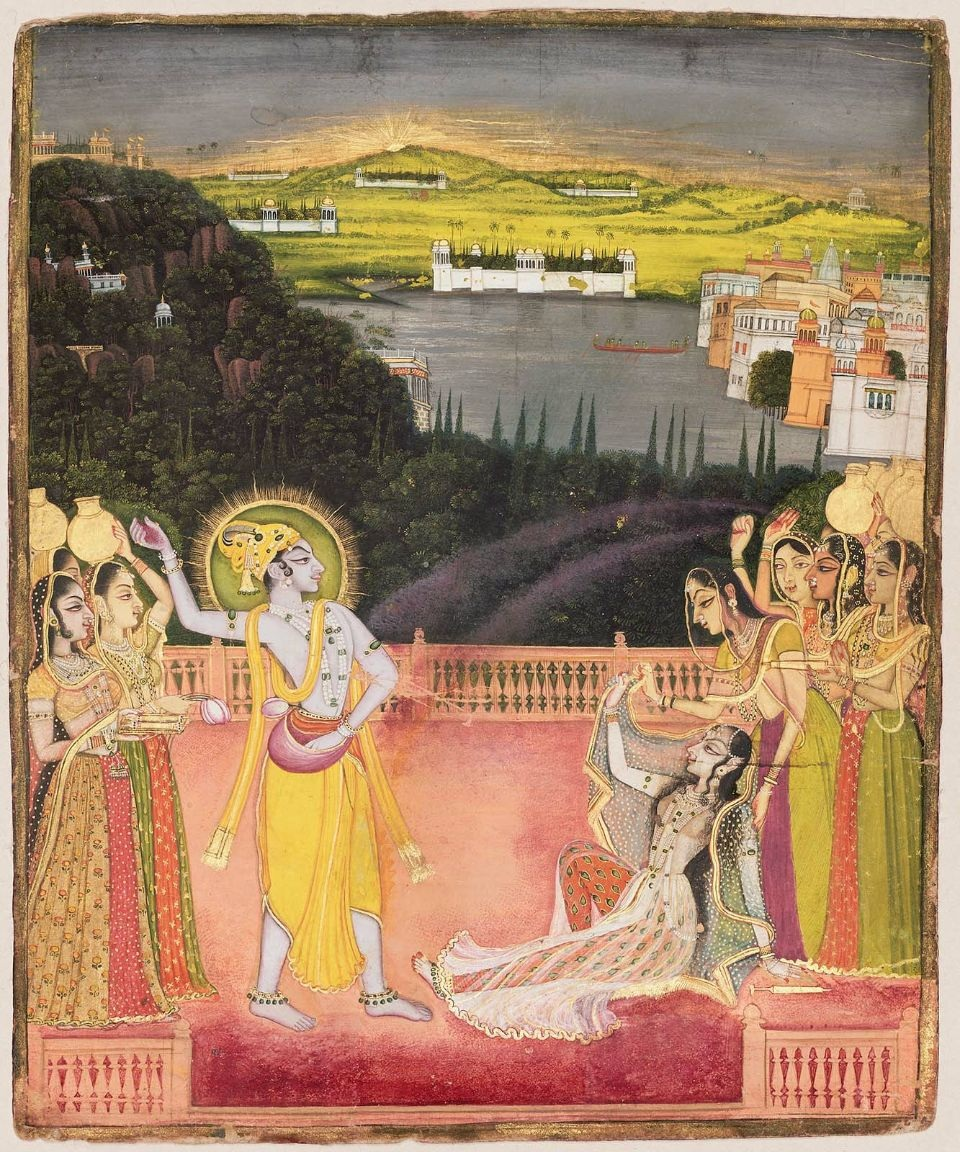
Krishna Celebrates Holi with Radha and the Gopis, 1750–60, Boston MFA

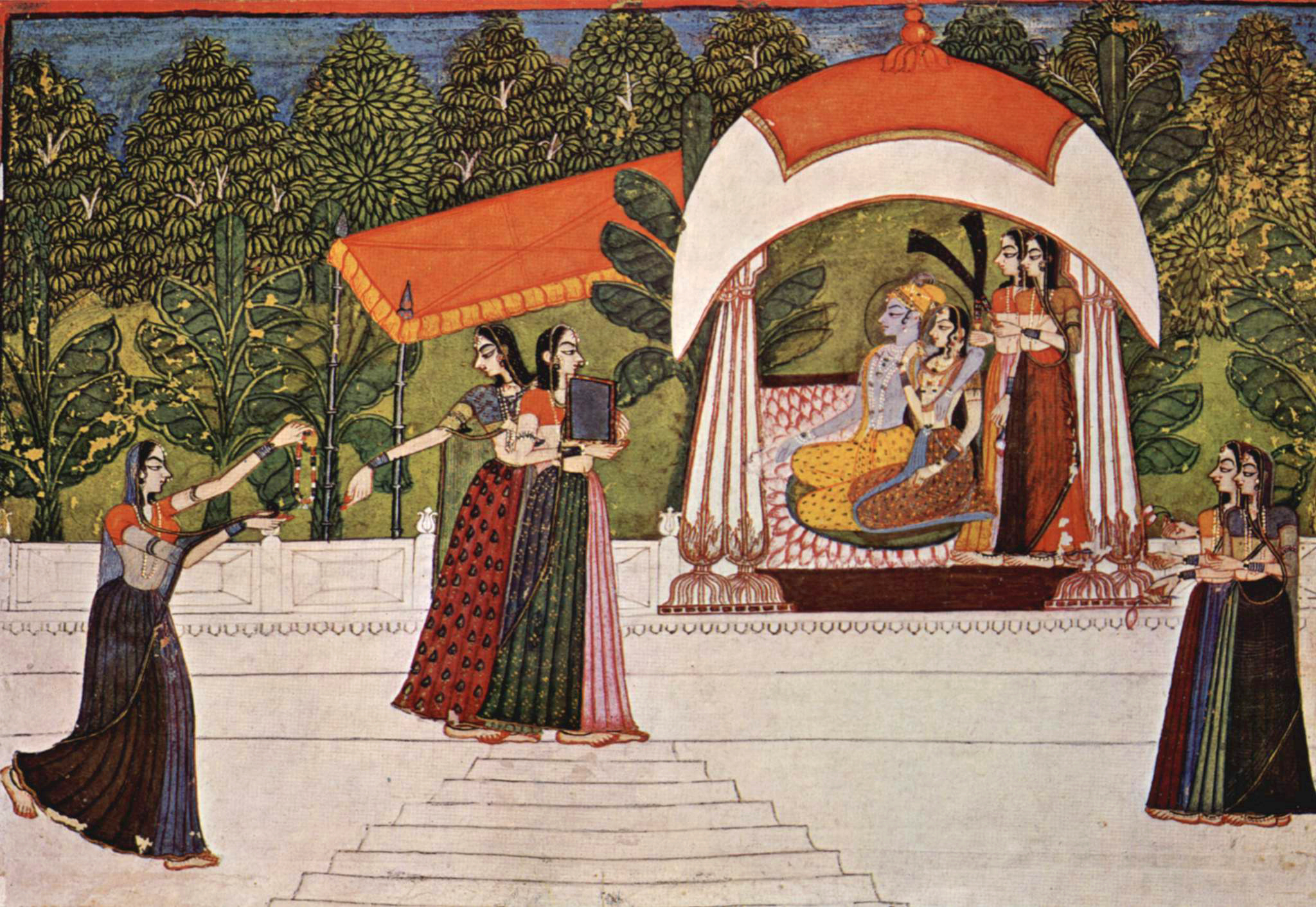
Krishna and Radha in a pavilion
