= François Marie Suzanne =

French sculptor

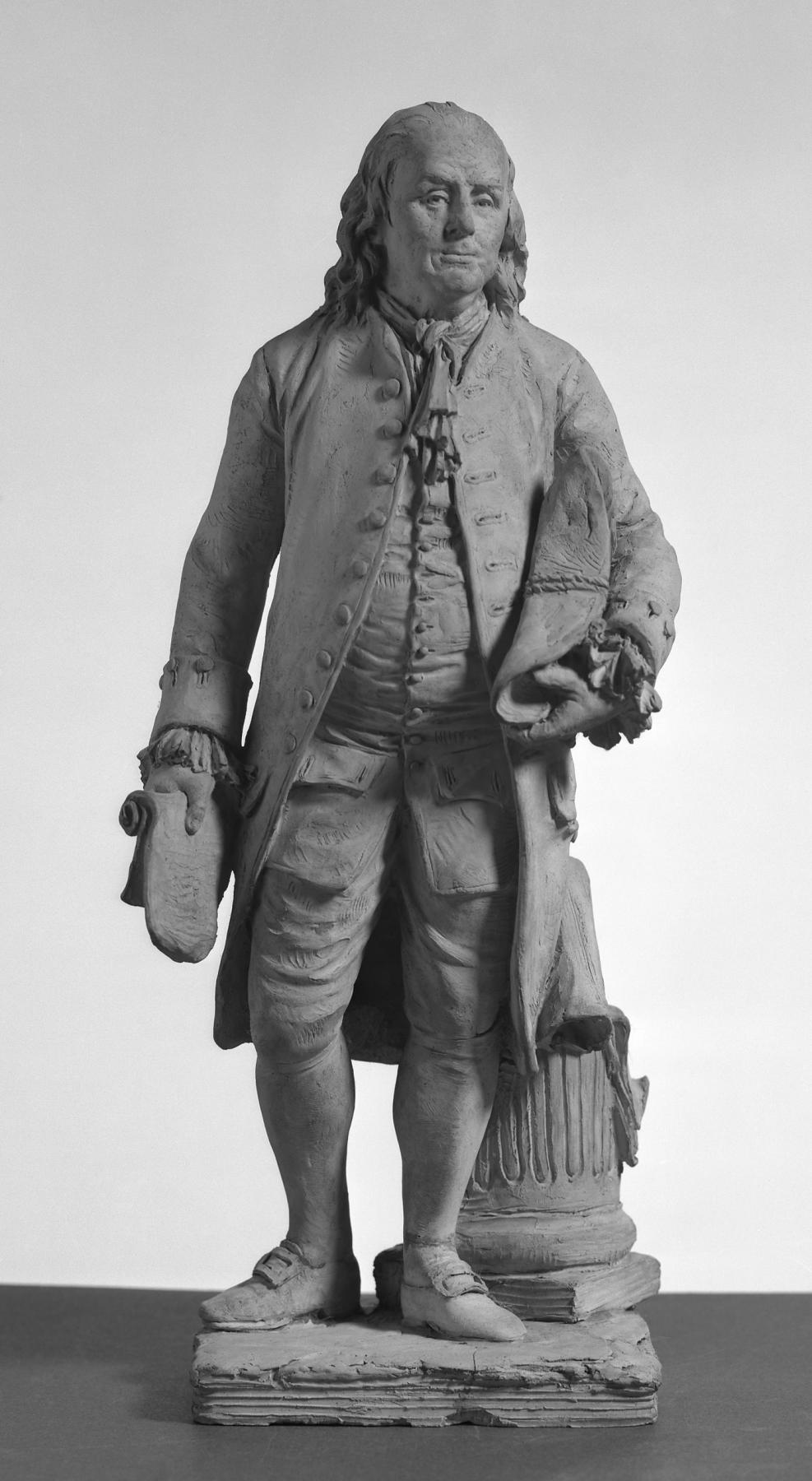
Benjamin Franklin by François Marie Suzanne, Walters Art Museum, 1793

François Marie Suzanne (1750 – unknown) was a French sculptor. His works included a full-length statuette of Rousseau, a terra cotta Bacchanal (1776) and a terra cotta statuette of Benjamin Franklin (1793). From July to August 1779 he and Jacques-Louis David visited Naples, Herculaneum and Pompeii.
