= Manuel de la Cruz y Fernández =

Cuban writer and journalist (1861–1896)

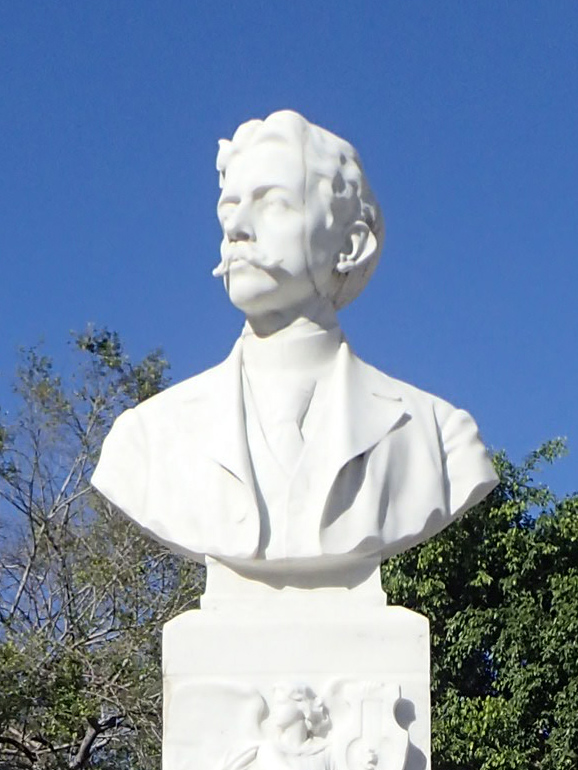
- Monument to Manuel de la Cruz in Havana, Cuba
- Born: 1861; Havana
- Died: 1896; New York
- Resting place: Green-Wood Cemetery
- Occupations: Writer, journalist

Manuel de la Cruz y Fernández (September 17, 1861 – February 19, 1896) was a Cuban writer and journalist. He served as editor of El Fígaro, a weekly Cuban magazine, and wrote for several magazines and newspapers in Cuba and abroad. In 1890, he published Episodios de la Revolución Cubana, a collection of first-hand accounts of the Ten Years' War. He also wrote fictional novels including La Hija del Montero (The Huntsman's Daughter) and La Hija del Guardiero (The Overseer's Daughter). De la Cruz died suddenly in 1896 at the age of 34.
