= Neapolitan Herder and a Cow Leaving a Cave =

Painting by Jean Barbault

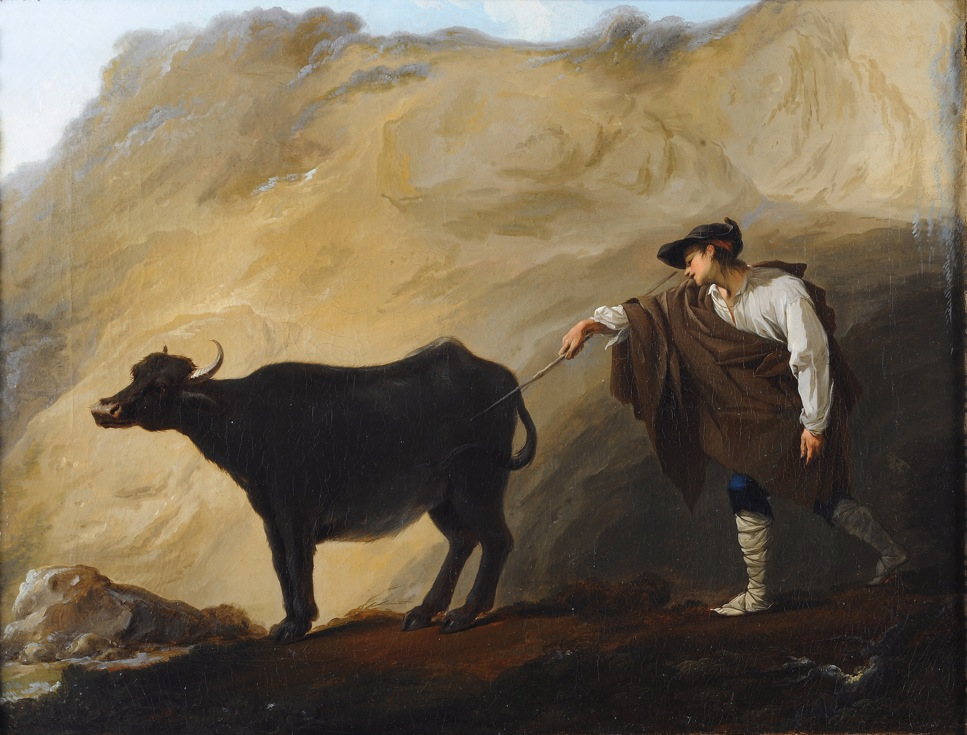
- Artist: Jean Barbault
- Year: circa 1750
- Medium: oil painting on canvas
- Movement: Rococo genre painting
- Dimensions: 49 cm × 64.5 cm (19 in × 25.4 in)
- Location: Musée des Beaux-Arts, Strasbourg
- Accession: 2009

Neapolitan Herder and a Cow Leaving a Cave (French: Berger napolitain et bufflonne quittant une grotte) is a circa 1750 painting by the French artist Jean Barbault. It is now in the Musée des Beaux-Arts of Strasbourg. Its inventory number is 44.2009.2.1.

The painting, which was unpublished before its purchase by the museum, is considered as one of the masterpieces of Jean Barbault, a French painter later established in Rome, who died at the early age of 43.

While the real subject of the painting remains mysterious (does it depict a simple genre scene, or does it depict Io with Argus, or with Mercury?), the herder looks like a figure that appears at the right edge of Barbault's extravagant painting (measuring 37.7 × 392 cm [14.8 × 154 in]) Mascarade des quatres parties du monde, now in the Musée des Beaux-Arts et d'Archéologie de Besançon, and may be a self-portrait.
