= Lucretia (Casali) =

Painting by Andrea Casali

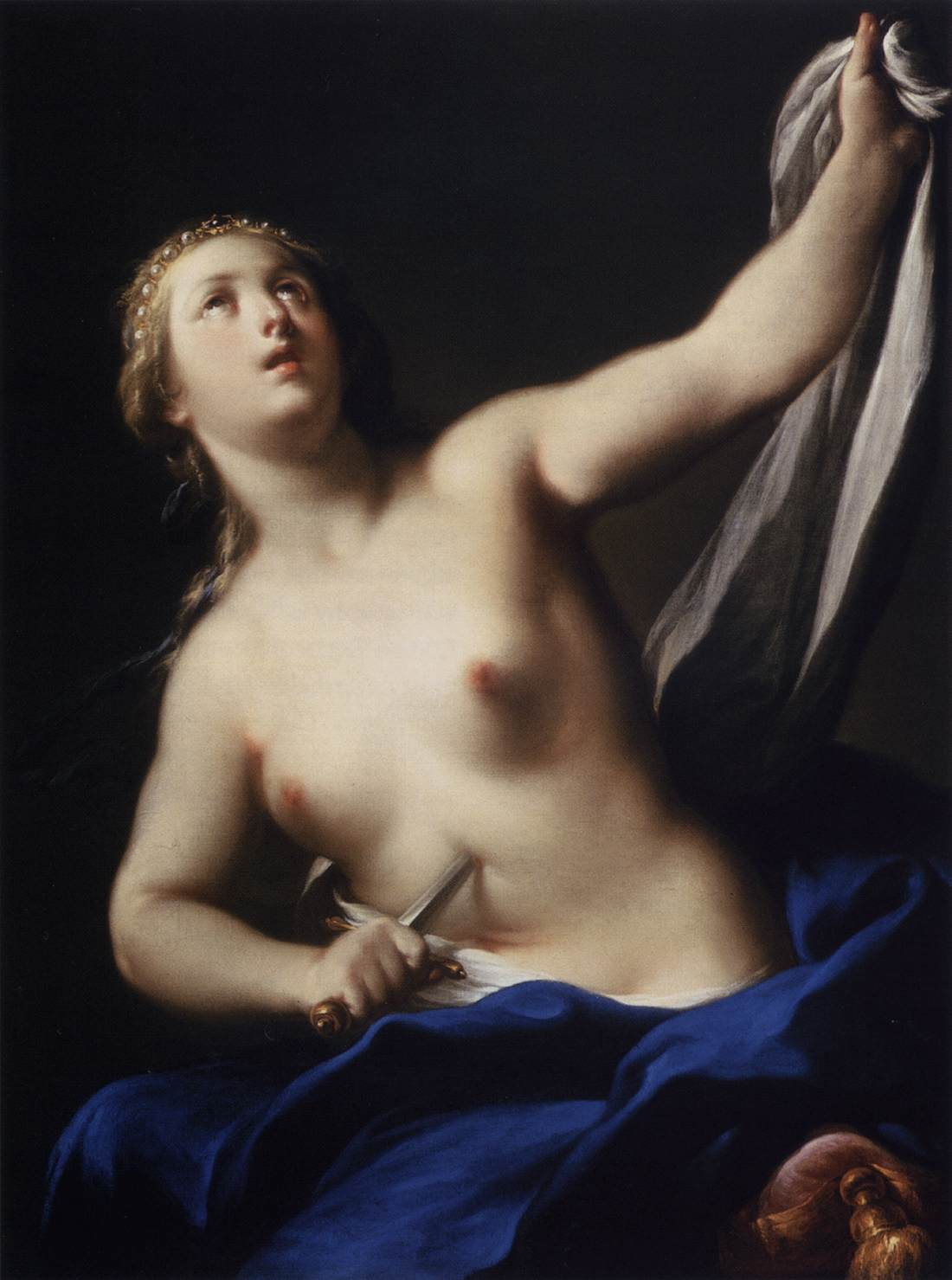
- Artist: Andrea Casali
- Year: c. 1750

Lucretia is an oil on canvas painting by the Italian Rococo artist Andrea Casali, completed around 1750.
