= A Sporting Contest on the Tiber =

Painting by Claude-Joseph Vernet

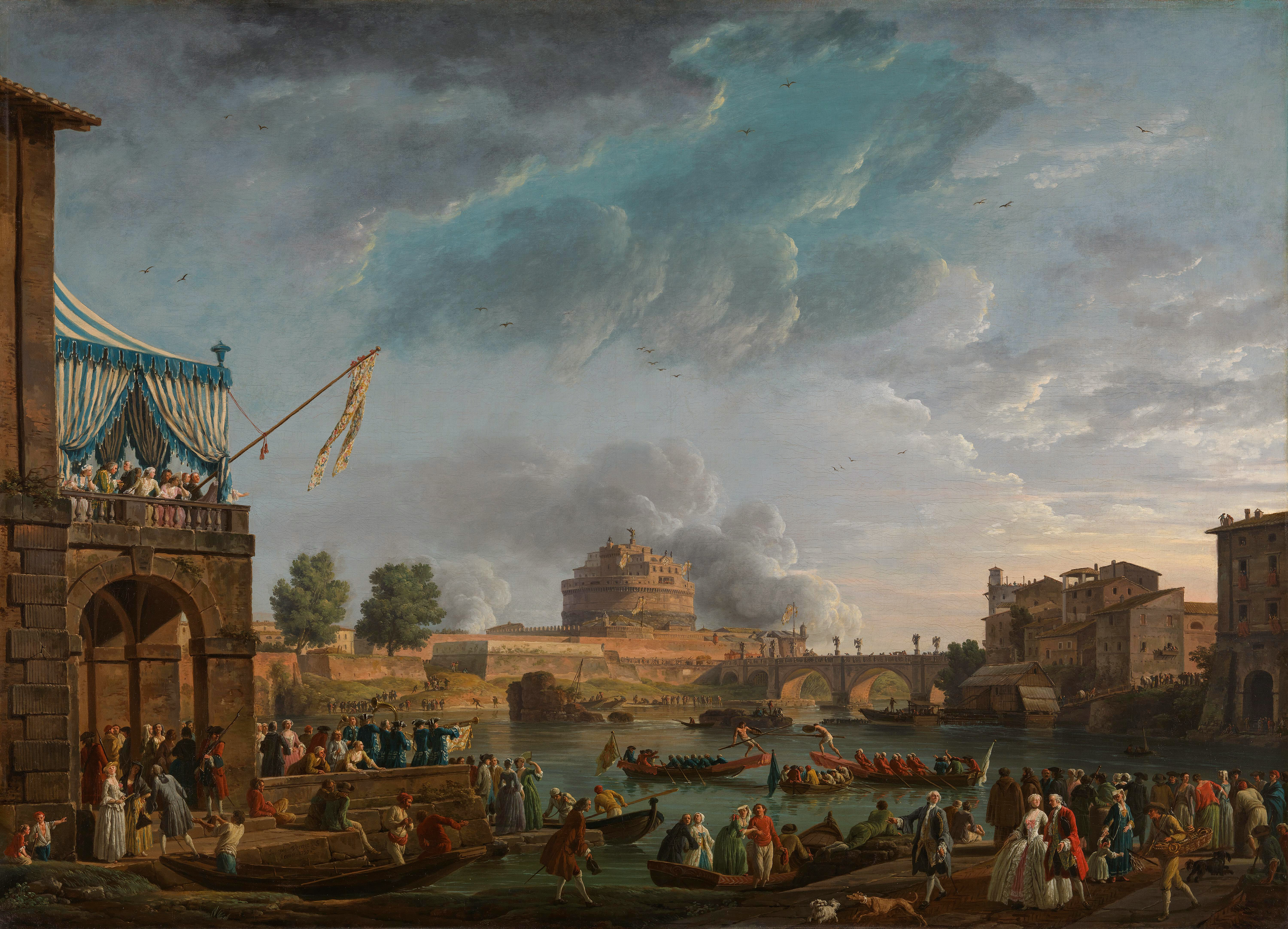
- Artist: Claude-Joseph Vernet
- Year: 1750
- Type: Oil on canvas, landscape genre painting
- Dimensions: 99.1 cm × 135.5 cm (39.0 in × 53.3 in)
- Location: National Gallery, London

A Sporting Contest on the Tiber is an oil on canvasgenre painting by the French artist Claude-Joseph Vernet, from 1750. It was one of four painting sent from Rome by Vernet to be submitted to the Paris Salon of 1750.

It shows a view from the west bank of the Tiber facing towards the Castel Sant'Angelo. The exact event it portrays is unknown, but river jousts was back then a popular form of entertainment. It is likely that Duke of Nevers, his wife and the artist are three of the figures shown prominently in the foreground. It is in the collection of the National Gallery, in London, having been presented to the gallery in 1853.

== Bibliography ==
- Hackney, Stephen. On Canvas: Preserving the Structure of Paintings. Getty Publications, 2020.
- Sutton, Denys. Fads and Fancies. Wittenborn, 1979.
