= Manuel de la Cruz (painter) =

Spanish painter

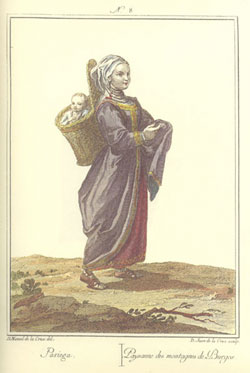
Girl from Pasiega, engraving by Juan de la Cruz Cano y Olmedilla after a drawing by his cousin Manuel de la Cruz from 1777

Manuel de la Cruz (1750–1792) was a Spanish painter. He was born and died in Madrid. He distinguished himself by his pictures in the cathedral of Carthagena and in the monastery of San Francisco el Grande at Madrid. In the Gallery of the latter city there is a painting by him of The Annual Fair at Madrid. He also etched a few plates of heads of strongly marked character.
