= Nihâl Chand =

Indian artist (1710–1782)

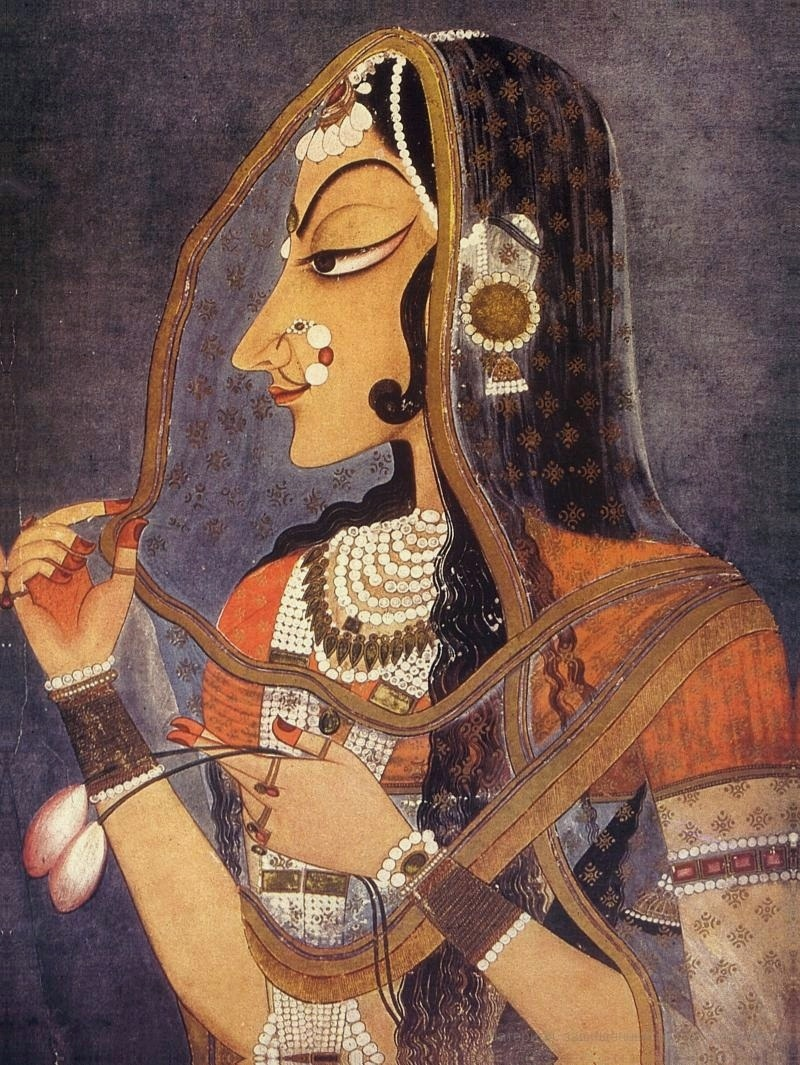
Bani Thani, attributed to Nihâl Chand, National Museum, New Delhi

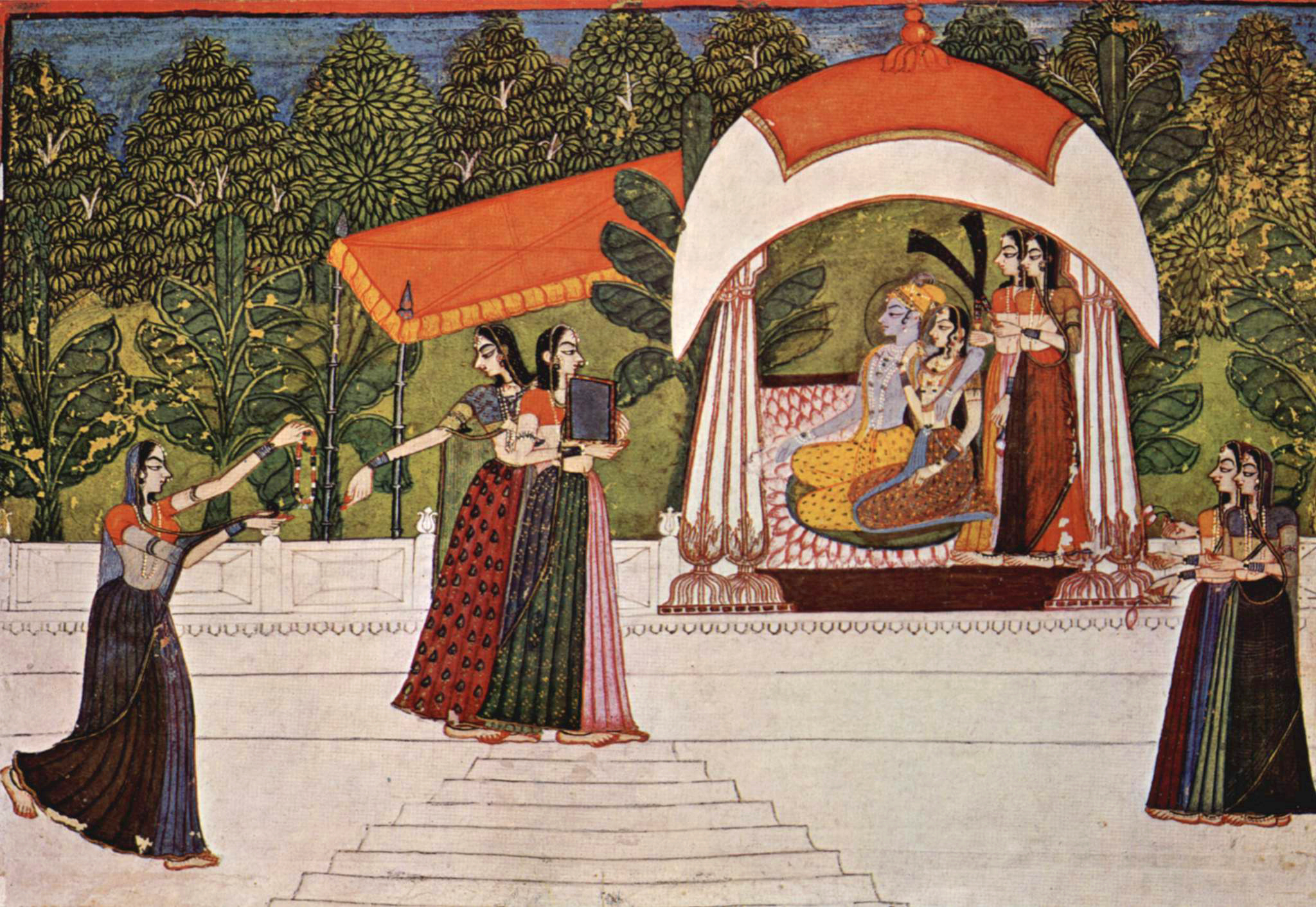
An 18th century Rajput painting by Nihâl Chand

Nihâl Chand (1710–1782) was an Indian painter and poet who produced some of the best known examples of Rajput painting. During his lifetime this was part of Rajputana. He was the chief painter at the court of Kishangarh during the time of the ruler Savant Singh (also known as Nagari Das). He is attributed with a small group of paintings in a distinctive style, produced for Raja Savant Singh, and mostly depicting the king and Bani Thani as Krishna and Radha respectively. These are "widely held to be the finest of all Rajasthani miniatures", and are unusually large for their type, reaching 19 by 14 inches (48 x 36 cm). He was a devout follower of Vallabha who had founded a Krishna-centric philosophy that surfaces repeatedly in his paintings as he signifies the deity with light blue skin. He arrived in Kishangarh between 1719 and 1726.

== Gallery ==
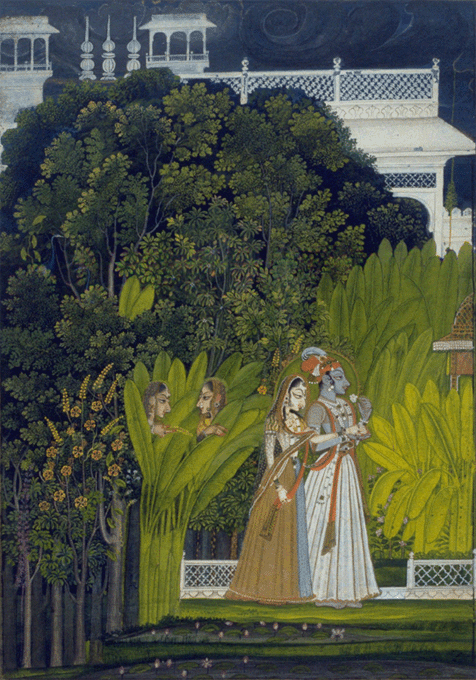
Raja Savant Singh and Bani Thani as Krishna and Radha, ca. 1760

Radha and Krishna in the boat of love

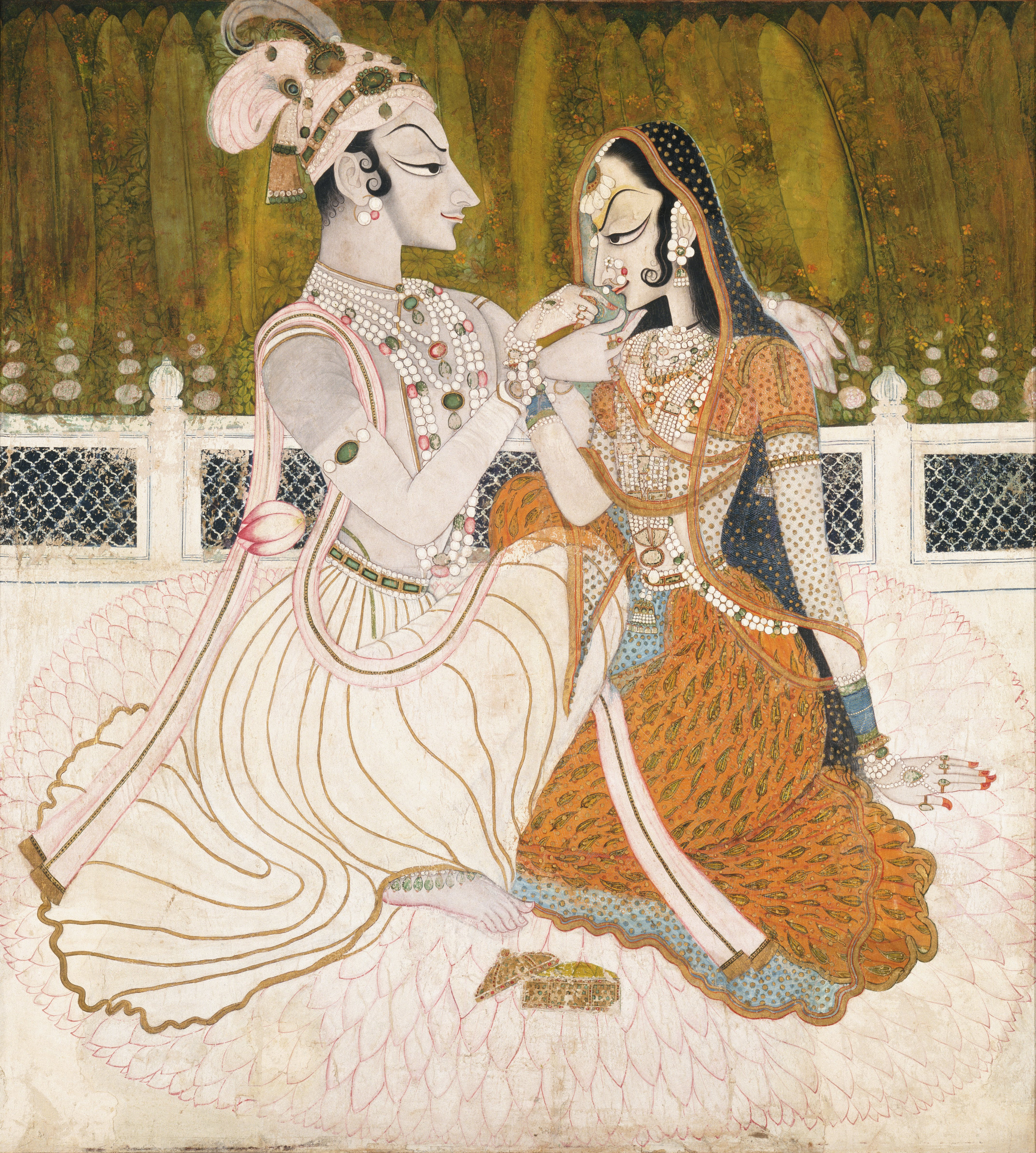
Krishna and Radha, opaque watercolor and gold on cotton, ca. 1750

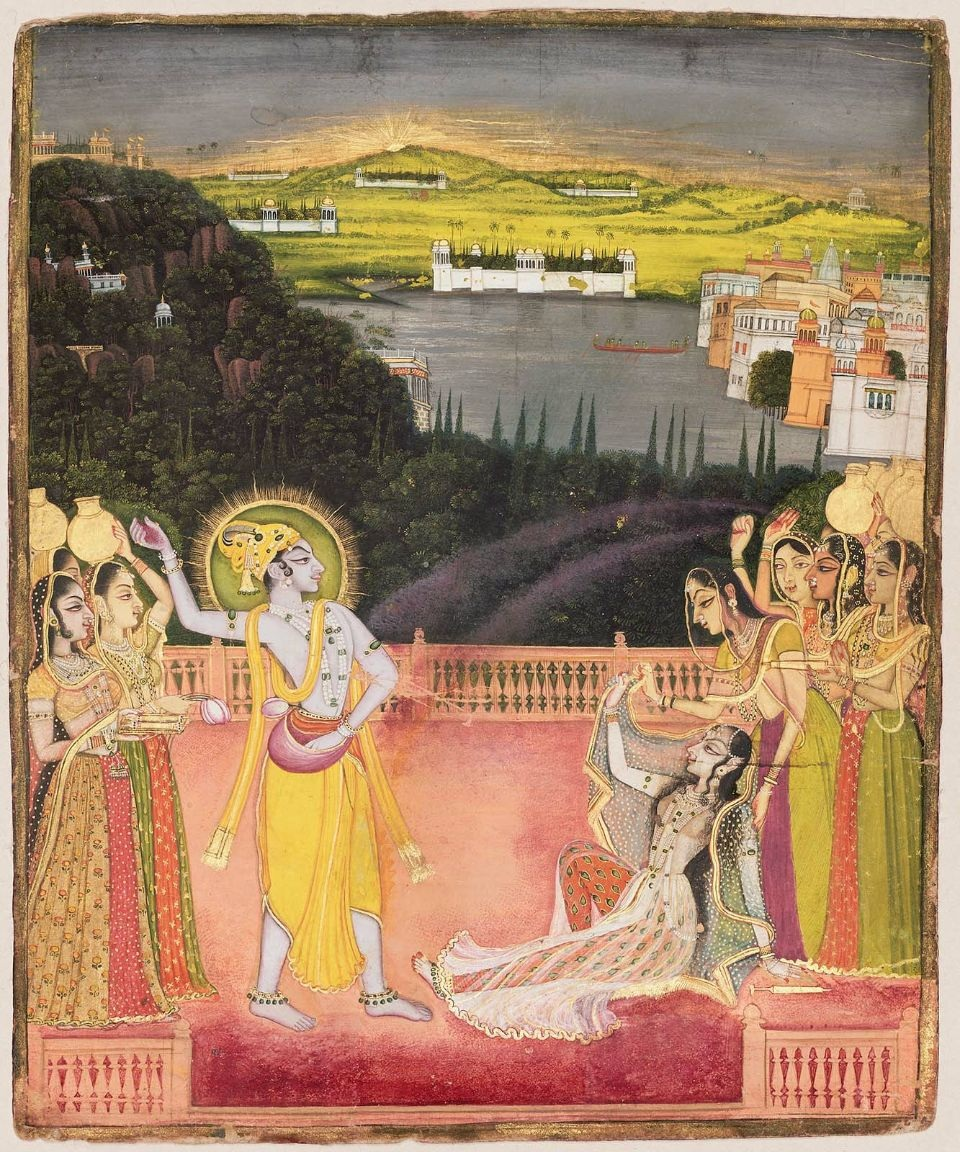
Krishna Celebrates Holi with Radha and the Gopis, 1750–60, Boston MFA
