= Virgin Annunciate =

Virgin Annunciate may refer to two paintings by the Italian Renaissance artist Antonello da Messina:

- Virgin Annunciate (Antonello da Messina, Munich), painted in 1473
- Virgin Annunciate (Antonello da Messina, Palermo), probably painted in 1476

== See also ==
- Annunciation
