= Christ at the Column (Antonello da Messina) =

Painting by Antonello da Messina

- Le Christ à la colonne (French)
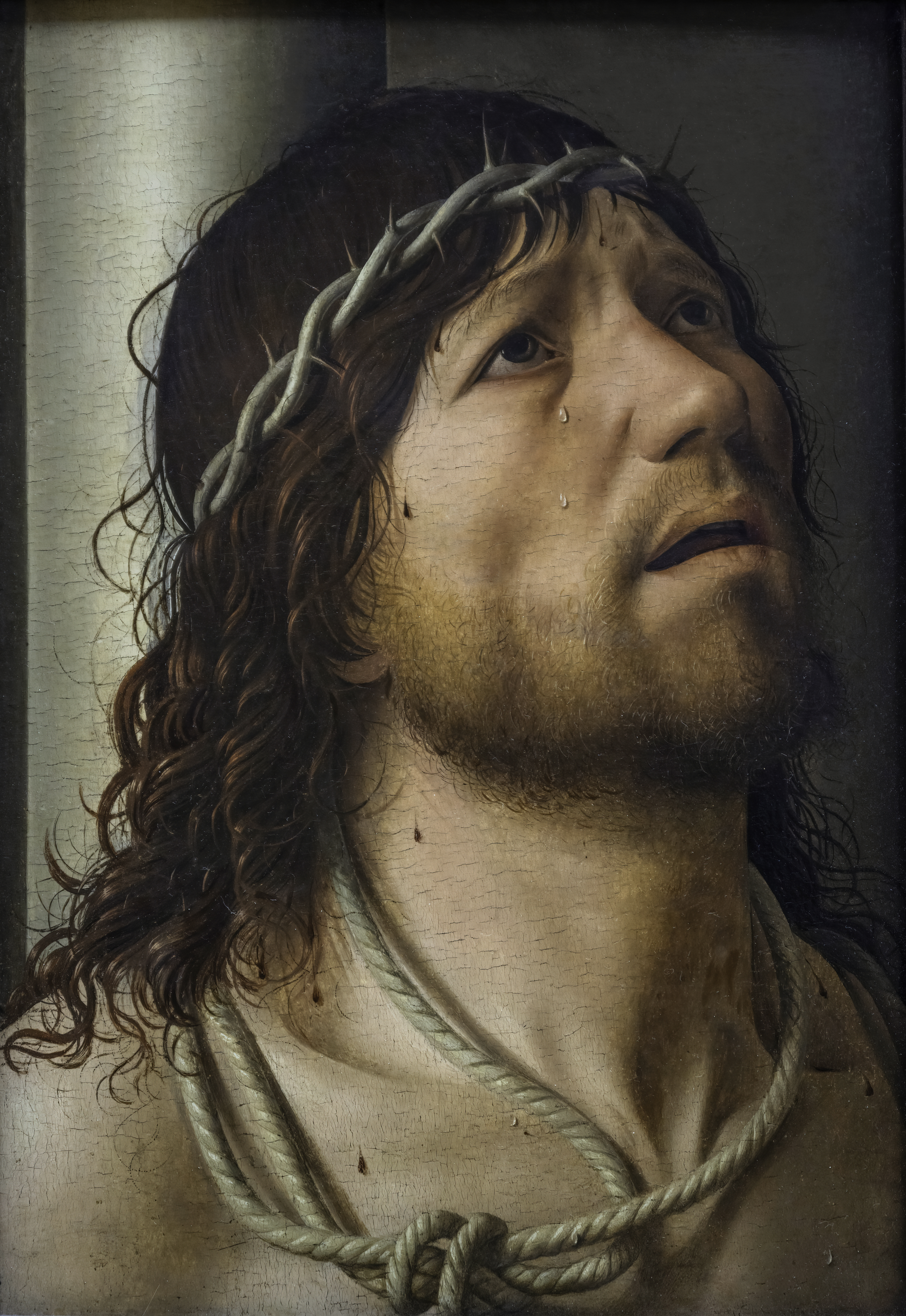
- Artist: Antonello da Messina
- Year: c.1476-1478
- Medium: painting on wood (poplar)
- Dimensions: 25.8 cm × 21 cm (10.2 in × 8.3 in)
- Location: Musée du Louvre, Paris
- Website: collections.louvre.fr/en/ark:/53355/cl010065042

Christ at the Column (Pillory) is a small painting by the Italian Renaissance artist Antonello da Messina, executed c. 1476–1478, showing the Flagellation of Christ. It is in the Louvre in Paris.

Painted in his final years, the pictures shows Antonello's assimilation of the Early Netherlandish and Venetian influences into a mature art. For a long time, the unusual small size and close-up view of the subject led scholars to think that the work had been cut down and originally extended lower, and that originally a parapet separated Christ from the watchers. This theory has been proved to be wrong.

The face of Christ was a common theme in Antonello's art: however, portraying Christ in the middle of his pain, in the moment in which the tortures have just begun, Antonello managed to obtain an emotive impact sometimes lacking in his similar works.

As usual, Antonello devoted high attention to the rendering of details: the sweaty hair, the beard (each hair of which can be distinguished), the half open mouth, in which teeth and tongue can be seen, the first stripes of blood marking the face, the perfectly transparent tear drops.

== See also ==
- Crucifixion (Antonello da Messina)
- Ecce Homo (Antonello da Messina)
