= Eustochia Smeralda Calafato =

Italian saint

Saint Eustochia Smeralda Calafato
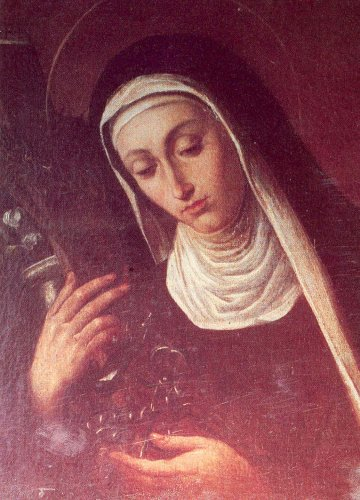
- Portrait of Eustochia

Hermitess of the Franciscan Order
- Born: 25 March 1434; Messina
- Died: 20 January 1485; Messina
- Venerated in: Roman Catholicism
- Beatified: 14 September 1782 by Pope Pius VI
- Canonized: 11 June 1988, Messina by Pope John Paul II
- Major shrine: Monastero di Montevergine
- Feast: 20 January (13 February among Traditional Roman Catholics; minor commemoration 22 August)
- Attributes: Poor Clare nun holding a cross
- Patronage: co-patron of Messina

Eustochia Smeralda Calafato (March 25, 1434 in Messina – January 20, 1485 also in Messina) is a Franciscan Italian saint belonging to the Order of the Poor Clares. She is co-patroness of Messina, which is also the centre of her cultus.

== Biography ==
She was born in the village of Santissima Annunziata, near Messina, Italy (for which reason she is often known as Eustochia of Messina). Most of what is known about her comes from the biography written two years after her death by one of her fellow nuns, Suor Jacopa Pollicino, daughter of the Baron of Tortorici. This biography, however, was only discovered in the 1940s.

Eustochia, born Smeralda Calafato, was the daughter of Bernardo Calafato, a rich merchant of Messina, and Mascalda Romano. While her mother was pregnant with her, Messina was stricken with the plague, and her parents fled the city for the small town of Santissima Annunziata, near Messina, where the child was born on 25 March 1434, the feast of the Annunciation, and in that year also Holy Thursday.

From an early age she was noted for her beauty but at the age of 15 against her parents' wishes she determined to take religious vows. She chose to enter the convent of Basicò, a house of Poor Clares. It seems that her brothers threatened to burn down the convent if she persisted in her plan, but this did not deter her. She took the name Eustochia, and remained at Basicò for over 10 years. She became known among the sisters for her conspicuous devotion and austerities. She frequently kept vigils, fasted often, and employed corporal mortification.

Eustochia was a great lover of the poverty that marked the Poor Clares and felt that Basicò did not adhere strictly enough to the rule in this regard. After discussions with the sisters and the abbess, and with the approval of Pope Callixtus III, in 1464 she decided to found a new convent which became known as Montevergine ("Mountain of the Virgin"). The building project was apparently completed through the funding of a wealthy relative. Eustochia was chosen abbess, and at the time of her death the convent was home to 50 sisters. She died on 20 January 1485, at the age of 50.

== Veneration ==
Eustochia was beatified in 1782 by Pope Pius VI and was canonized on 11 June 1988 by Pope John Paul II.

Her incorrupt body rests in the monastery of Sanctuary of Montevergine in Messina that was founded by her around in 1459. In recent centuries, because she is the co-patron of Messina, every August 22 her body has been exposed to the veneration of the people and, with a solemn celebration, the Municipality of Messina offers a gift to her. This long-standing tradition has survived to the present day; her body can be visited twice a week. Her feast was traditionally kept by Franciscans on 13 February, though it was removed from the general Franciscan calendar in the post-conciliar reforms. Her feast is kept in Messina on the date of her death, 20 January.

== Art ==
- It is thought that Eustochia was the model for Antonello da Messina's depiction of the Virgin of the Annunciation.

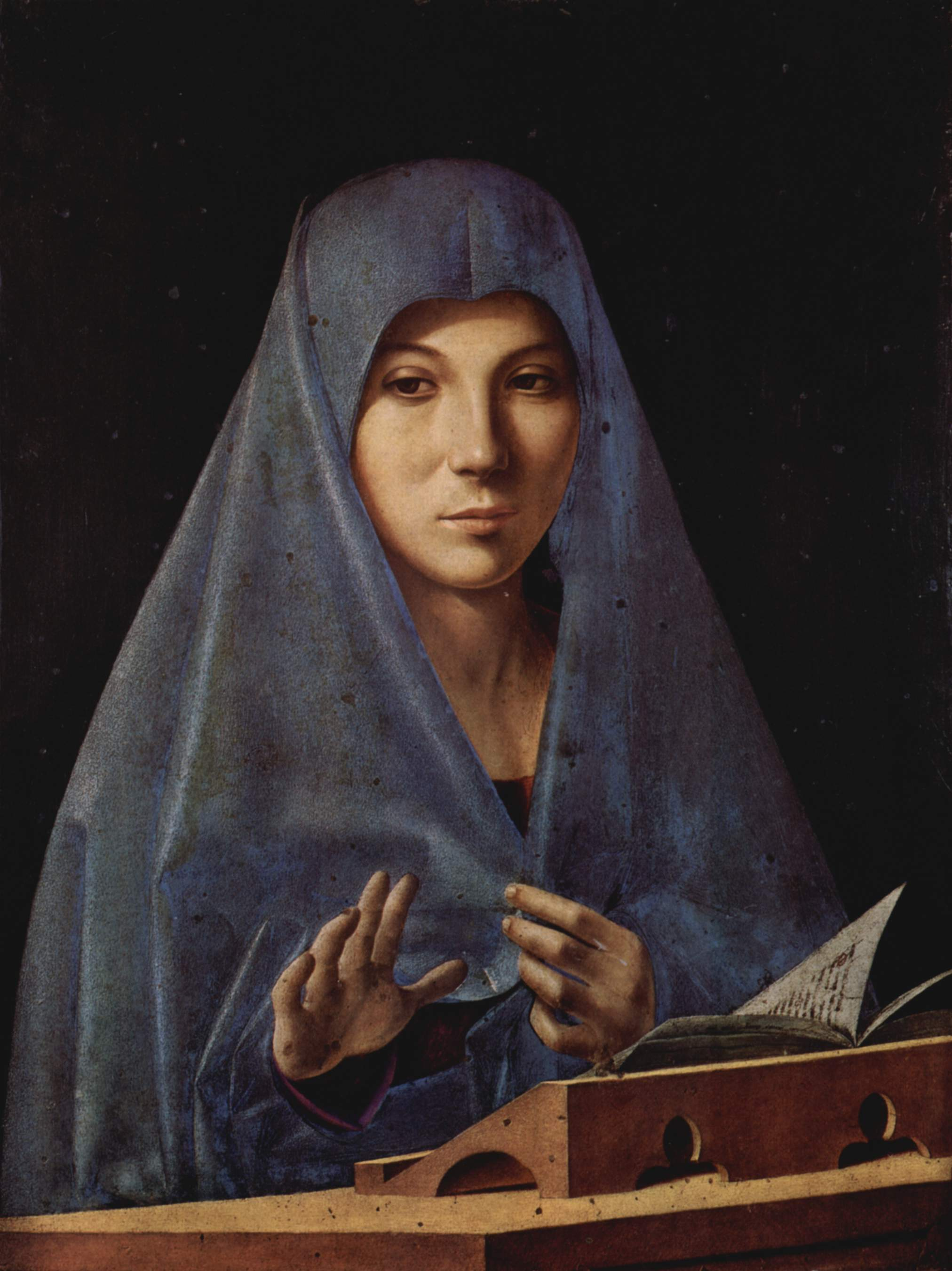
Virgin of the Annunciation, Palazzo Abatellis, Palermo.
