= Saint Jerome in His Study (Antonello da Messina) =

Painting by Antonello da Messina

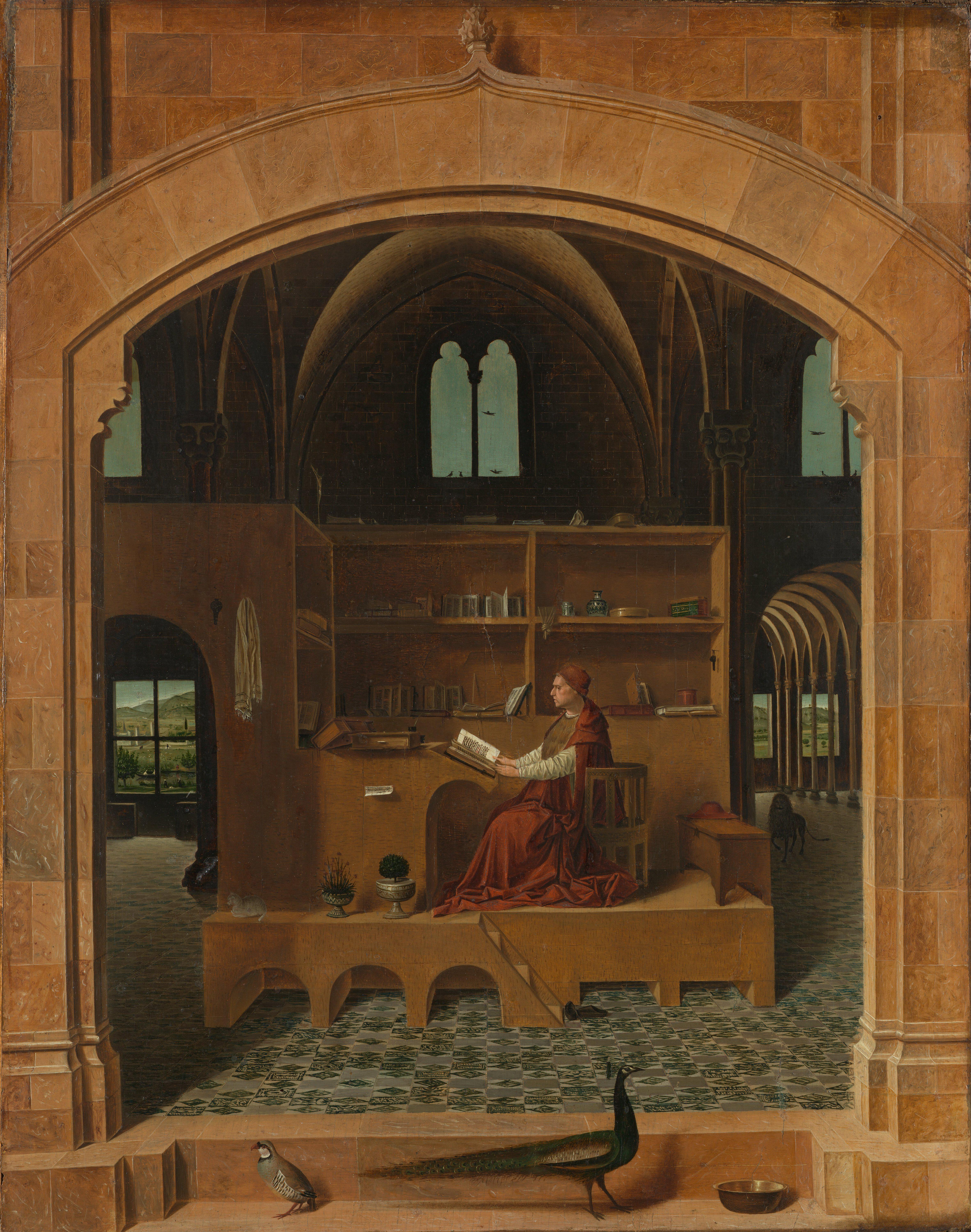
- Artist: Antonello da Messina
- Year: c. 1474
- Type: Oil on limewood
- Dimensions: 45.7 cm × 36.2 cm (18.0 in × 14.3 in)
- Location: National Gallery, London
- Accession: NG1418
- Website: www.nationalgallery.org.uk/paintings/antonello-da-messina-saint-jerome-in-his-study

Saint Jerome in His Study is a painting by the Italian Renaissance master Antonello da Messina. The painting depicts human, natural, and divine knowledge, and is filled with architectural qualities. It was the property of Antonio Pasqualino and afterwards of Thomas Baring, 1st Earl of Northbrook; since 1894 it has been in the collection of the National Gallery, London.

== Description ==
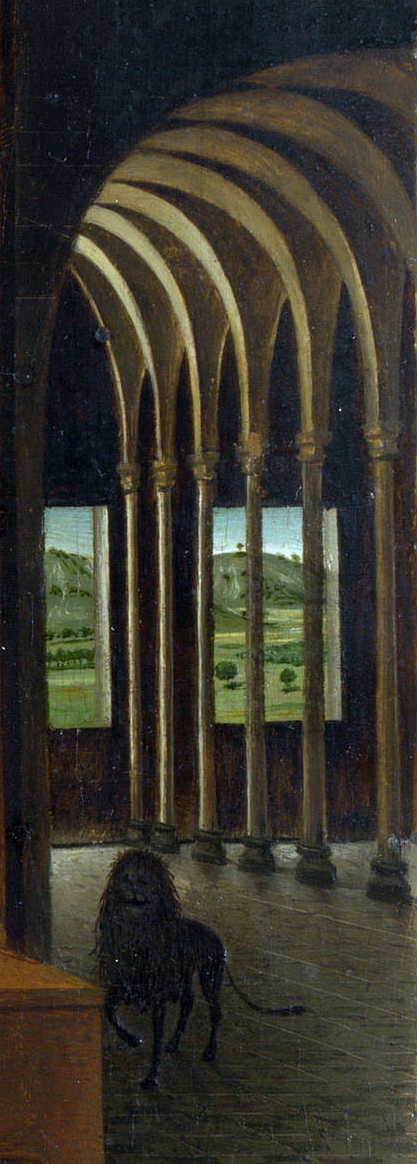
Detail of the colonnade and the window on the left, with the lion that followed Saint Jerome wherever he went

The small picture is painted in oil on limewood panel. It portrays Saint Jerome – known for his teachings on Christian moral life – working in his study, a room without walls and ceiling viewed through an aperture (probably within a Gothic monastery). In common with several other works by the Messinese painter, the protagonist is accompanied by a host of supporting details pertinent to the contemporary Flemish school: books, animals, pottery, etc., all painted with precise detail and "optical truth".

The scene is devised such that the light rays coincide with the perspective axis, focusing on the saint's torso and hands. A verdant landscape is revealed through the windows from both sides of the study. Animals include a partridge (Alectoris graeca) and a peacock in the foreground, both having symbolical meanings, a cat, and a lion, typically associated with Saint Jerome, in the shade on the right.

== History ==
The painting is first recorded in 1529 by the Venetian art scholar Marcantonio Michiel, in the collection of Antonio Pasqualino. It was then thought to be by one of three possible artists: Antonello, Jan van Eyck or Hans Memling.

It was not until 1856 that the work was positively attributed to Antonello da Messina by the art critics Giovanni Battista Cavalcaselle and Joseph Archer Crowe, who were compiling a catalogue of early Flemish painters. The painting was initially believed to have been executed during the early days of Antonello's Venetian sojourn. However, its varied perspectives and complexities make it likely to have been a demonstration work, intended to be shown to Venetian patrons; synthesis of perspective and light, this work was probably brought to Venice as a "painting essay" to attract future commissions.

The painting is thought to have been completed c. 1475, but as Antonello finished two more elaborate and precise paintings in 1475, a Crucifixion for Antwerp and one for London, the latter year can be doubted. The Messina scholar Carmelo Micalizzi, analysing a print reproducing the picture and observing it specularly and with magnification, has identified, in the fine drawing of some of the floor tiles, the signature, date, and place of execution of the work: ANTN, XI 1474, MISSI. According to Micalizzi, the painter would have concealed his name, Antonello, the date, November 1474, and the city of Messina.

== Style ==
=== Detail ===
A doorway in the form of a large low arch opens onto the cabinetry of Saint Jerome, best known for his translation of a large portion of the Bible into Latin (the translation that became known as the Vulgate) and his commentaries on the Gospels. His list of writings is extensive.

In the painting, Jerome's study is shown as a raised room with three steps, set in a large Gothic building with a colonnade on the right. The room is lit by a complex use of light which, in the Flemish manner, comes from several sources: firstly, from the central arch flow rays come in perspective directions, directing the viewer's gaze to Saint Jerome, particularly to his hands and book, giving the saint a particular stateliness. Then, from a series of apertures piercing the background wall; in particular from two windows in the lower half of the painting, which respectively illuminate a room on the left and the colonnade on the right in chiaroscuro, and three trefoil windows illuminating the vaults. Despite the complexity, the light manages to produce a unified effect, linking the different parts of the panel, thanks also to the solid perspective construction. The richness of the details is also reminiscent of the Flemish manner, with the careful description of the individual objects and their specific "lustre", i.e., the way each surface refracts light.

The presence of the outer frame is a compositional expedient, present in Flemish art but also cited by Leon Battista Alberti, to objectify the space of the representation, distancing it and distinguishing it from the spectator. The "cell" of the writing desk appears perfectly organised, with its furniture, shelves, and other minute objects, such as the majolica vases for herbs. The open books on the shelves seem to be arranged in this way to measure the depth of the recess. The geometrically tiled floor appears to be a veritable tour de force of perspective, perfect in its geometric definition and the play of light and shadow that varies according to the source of illumination. It is possible that Antonello was influenced by Piero della Francesca's De Prospectiva pingendi, published around that time.

In the foreground, on the left, the partridge alludes to the Truth of Christ, while the peacock recalls the Church and divine omniscience. On the ledge on which the saint's desk sits, from the left is seen a cat and two potted plants: a boxwood, which alludes to faith in divine salvation, and a geranium, a reference to the Passion of Christ. On the coffer to the right is a cardinal's hat.

The lion is less symbolic and alludes to the legend of Saint Jerome in the Wilderness, when a limping lion came to the saint. He examined the injured foot and extracted the thorn he found there. This cured the foot and the lion stayed with Jerome until his death.

Despite its small size, the painting has a striking effect due to the interplay of the light with the Gothic architecture as it highlights solids and voids, strikes the subject, and then flows outwards through the windows, revealing the manicured landscape. The central perspective takes the gaze directly to the figure of the saint, who has taken off his shoes and is sitting on a cathedra. It then widens to the details of the study.

== Symbolism ==
Antonello uses many symbols throughout the painting. The book Saint Jerome is reading represents knowledge. The books surrounding him refer to his translation of the Bible into Latin. The lion in the shadows to the right of the saint is from a story about Saint Jerome pulling a thorn out of a lion's paw. In gratitude, the lion follows Saint Jerome around for the rest of his life, like a house cat. The peacock and partridge play no specific part in the story of Saint Jerome. However, the peacock generally symbolises immortality, and the partridge is an ambivalent reference to truth/deceit.

== Sources ==
- Battisti, Eugenio. Antonello, il teatro sacro, gli spazi, la donna (Il labirinto). Palermo: Novecento. ISBN 88-373-0021-2.
- Carmelo Micalizzi, San Girolamo nello Specchio. Riflessioni su Antonello De Antonio, Di Nicolò Edizioni, Messina 2016
- "Saint Jerome in the Desert". Detroit Institute of Arts Museum. 18 April 2017.
- "St Jerome and the Lion by WEYDEN, Rogier van der". Web Gallery of Art, searchable fine arts image database.
