= Virgin Annunciate (Antonello da Messina, Munich) =

Painting by Antonello da Messina

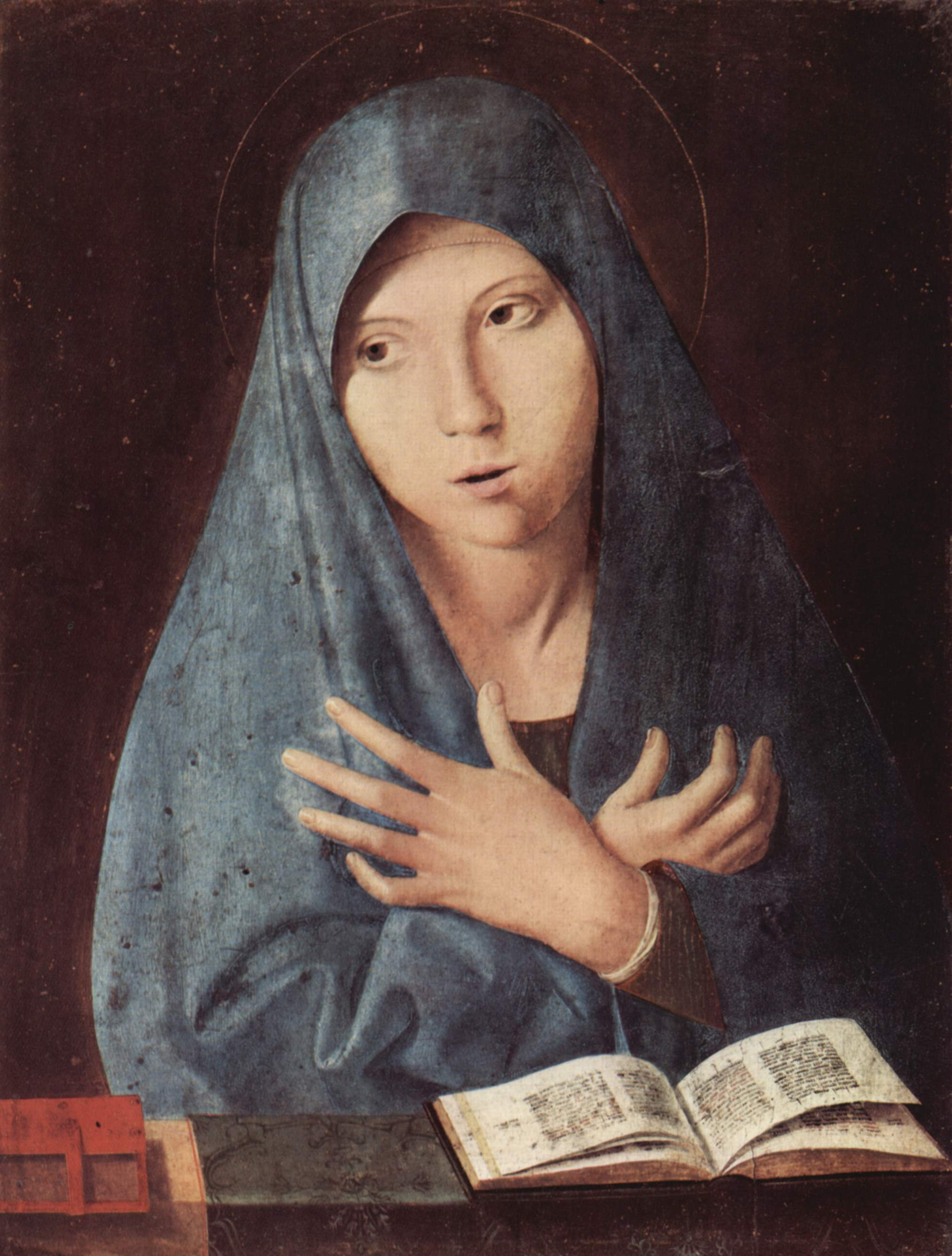
- Artist: Antonello da Messina
- Year: 1473
- Medium: Oil on wood
- Dimensions: 42.5 cm × 32.8 cm (16.7 in × 12.9 in)
- Location: Alte Pinakothek; Munich
- Accession: 8054
- Website: www.sammlung.pinakothek.de/de/artwork/JzG6R7ZGWO

The Munich Virgin Annunciate is an oil-on-wood painting by the Italian Renaissance artist Antonello da Messina, executed in 1473. Like the more famous Palermo version of the same subject, it shows Mary interrupted at her reading by the Angel of the Annunciation.
