= Pasqualino =

Pasqualino is a surname and given name. Notable people with the name include:

surname

- Antonio Pasqualino, 15th-century Patrician of Venice
- Fortunato Pasqualino, Italian novelist, philosopher, playwright and journalist
- Luke Pasqualino (born 1990), British actor

given name

- Pasqualino Abeti (born 1948), Italian sprinter
- Pasqualino Borsellino (born 1956), Italian football player and manager
- Pasqualino De Santis (1927–1996), Italian cinematographer
- Pasqualino Lolordo (1887–1929), was an Italian-born American Mafia boss
- Pasqualino Morbidelli (1948–2020), Italian boxer
- Pasqualino Moretti (born 1947), Italian cyclist
