= Calvary (Antonello da Messina) =

Painting by Antonello da Messina

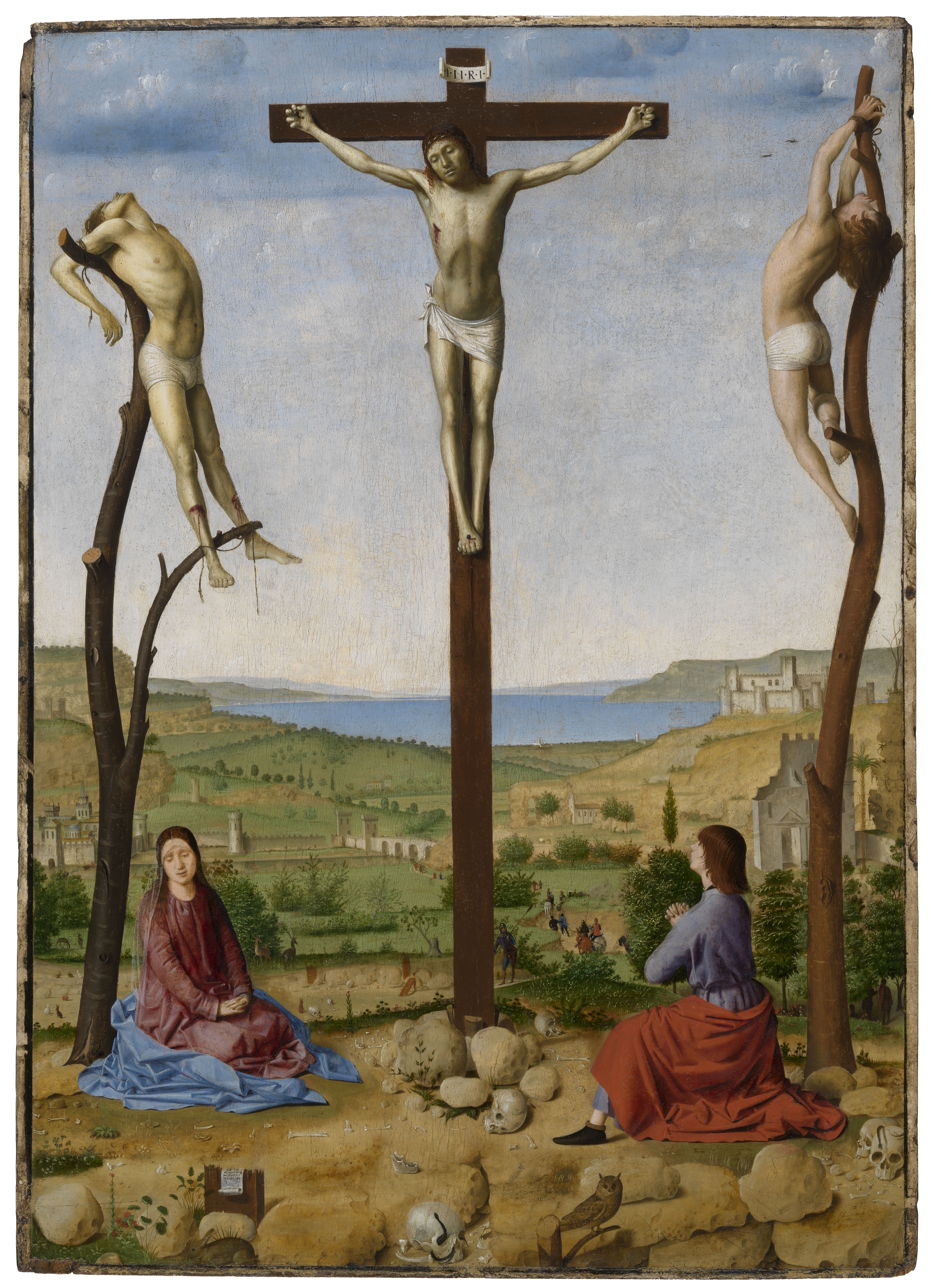
Calvary (1475) by Antonello da Messina

Calvary is an oil-on-wood painting executed in 1475 by the Italian Renaissance painter Antonello da Messina. Also known as the Antwerp Crucifixion, it is now in the Royal Museum of Fine Arts, Antwerp, making it the only work by the artist in Belgium.

== Context ==
This painting has an important benchmark value in the oeuvre of Antonello da Messina because it is one of the few signed (only twelve) and dated works (ten) by this painter. The painting belongs to the late work of the Sicilian artist and contains influences from South Italian, Flemish and Venetian styles.

== Description ==
With this Calvary, the Renaissance artist Antonello da Messina painted a symbolic masterpiece about death and redemption. Christ hangs on the cross in the center of the panel. The good and the bad thief, flanking Christ on the cross, are tied to truncated trees. The bodies of the three condemned to death are realistically and plastically worked out. The study of the human body through anatomical research and dissection formed an important part of the Italian Renaissance artist's art of drawing. On the ground Mary mourns and kneels John, Christ's favorite apostle.

The skulls at the bottom of the cross refer to Adam. According to some, he was buried on Golgotha, the hill on which Christ was killed. Because Adam and Eve could not resist the temptation of the serpent, sin entered the world. With his death on the cross, Christ put an end to the Fall.

The theme of death and redemption is strongly present here in a symbolic way. The serpents winding through the skulls symbolize death or the devil. The owl at the front refers to the sinners who turn away from the "true faith" as a night bird shuns the daylight. A twig grows from a tree stump behind the cross, symbolizing the contrast between God's Old and New Covenant with mankind.

== Influence of Flemish Primitives ==
The work of Antonello da Messina shows a clear influence of the Flemish Primitives. This is particularly evident in the detailed elaboration of the plants and animals in the atmospherically rendered landscape. The painter also adopted the oil painting technique from the Flemish Primitives. This makes the reproduction of colors richer and more vibrant than with the older painting technique with tempera, a binder based on egg and glue. The artist probably became acquainted with the new technique through the presence of paintings by the Flemish Primitives in Naples and southern Italy.
