= Antonio Pasqualino =

15th-century Patrician of Venice

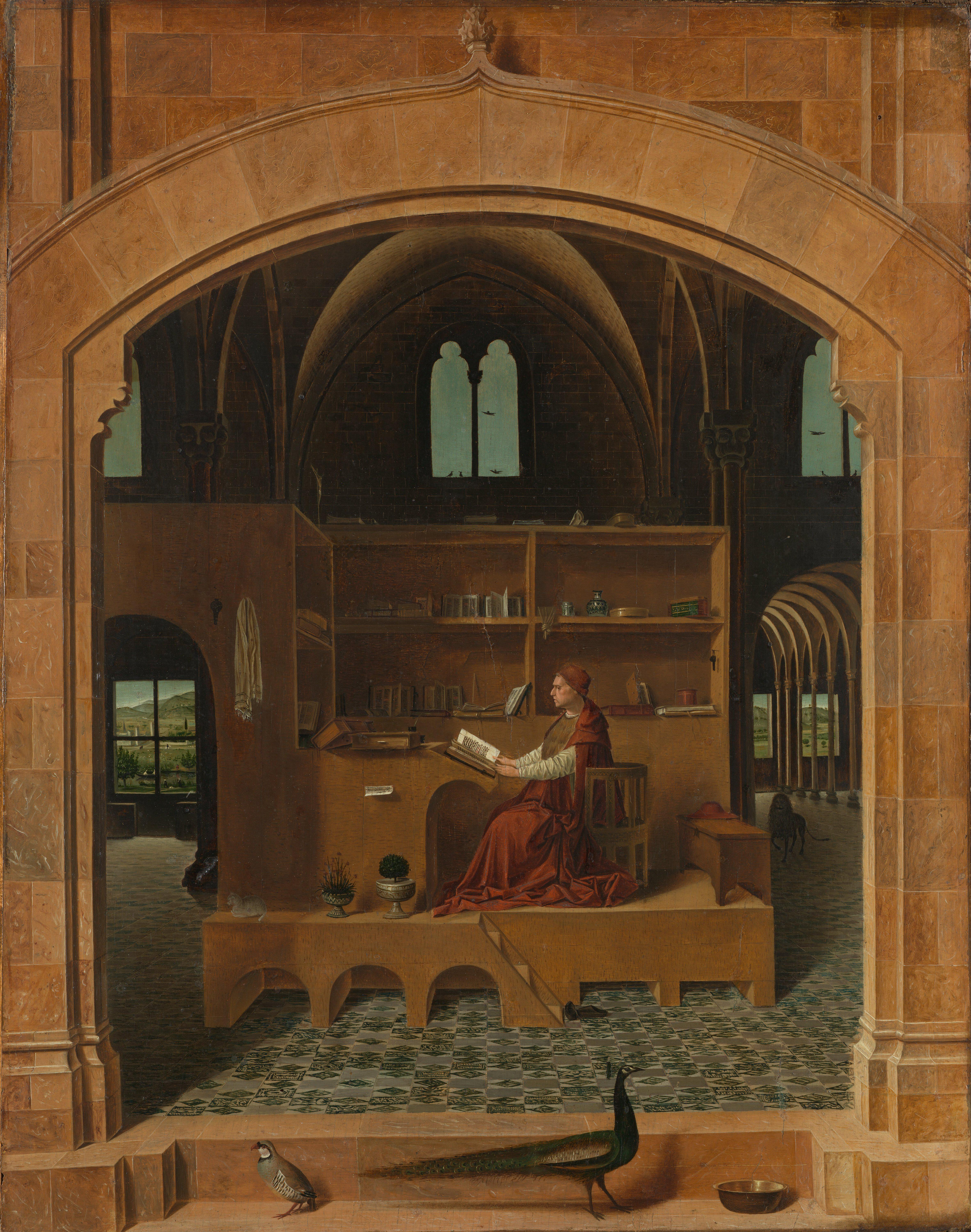
Saint Jerome in his Study by Antonello da Messina, c. 1474, originally owned by Antonio Pasqualino.

Antonio Pasqualino was a 15th-century non-Patrician silk-merchant of Venice. He is best known as an art collector, owning works, by among other, Gentile da Fabriano, Giovanni Bellini, Giorgione and Antonello da Messina.
