= Saint Jerome and Abraham panels =

Two paintings by Antonello da Messina

Saint Jerome Penitent
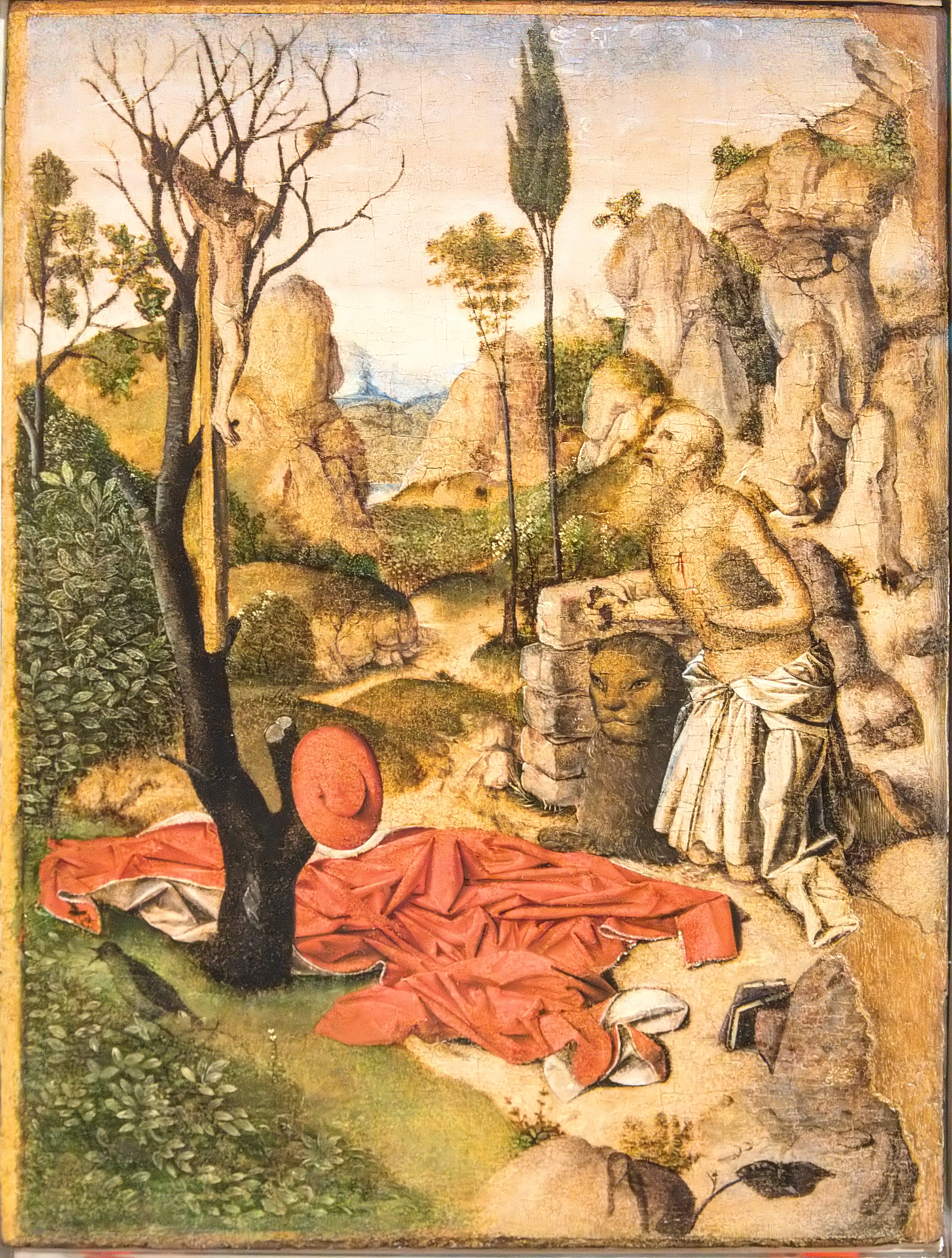
- Artist: Antonello da Messina
- Year: c. 1455
- Type: Various techniques on wood
- Dimensions: 40.2 cm × 30.2 cm (15.8 in × 11.9 in)
- Location: Pinacoteca Civica; Reggio Calabria

Abraham Served by Three Angels
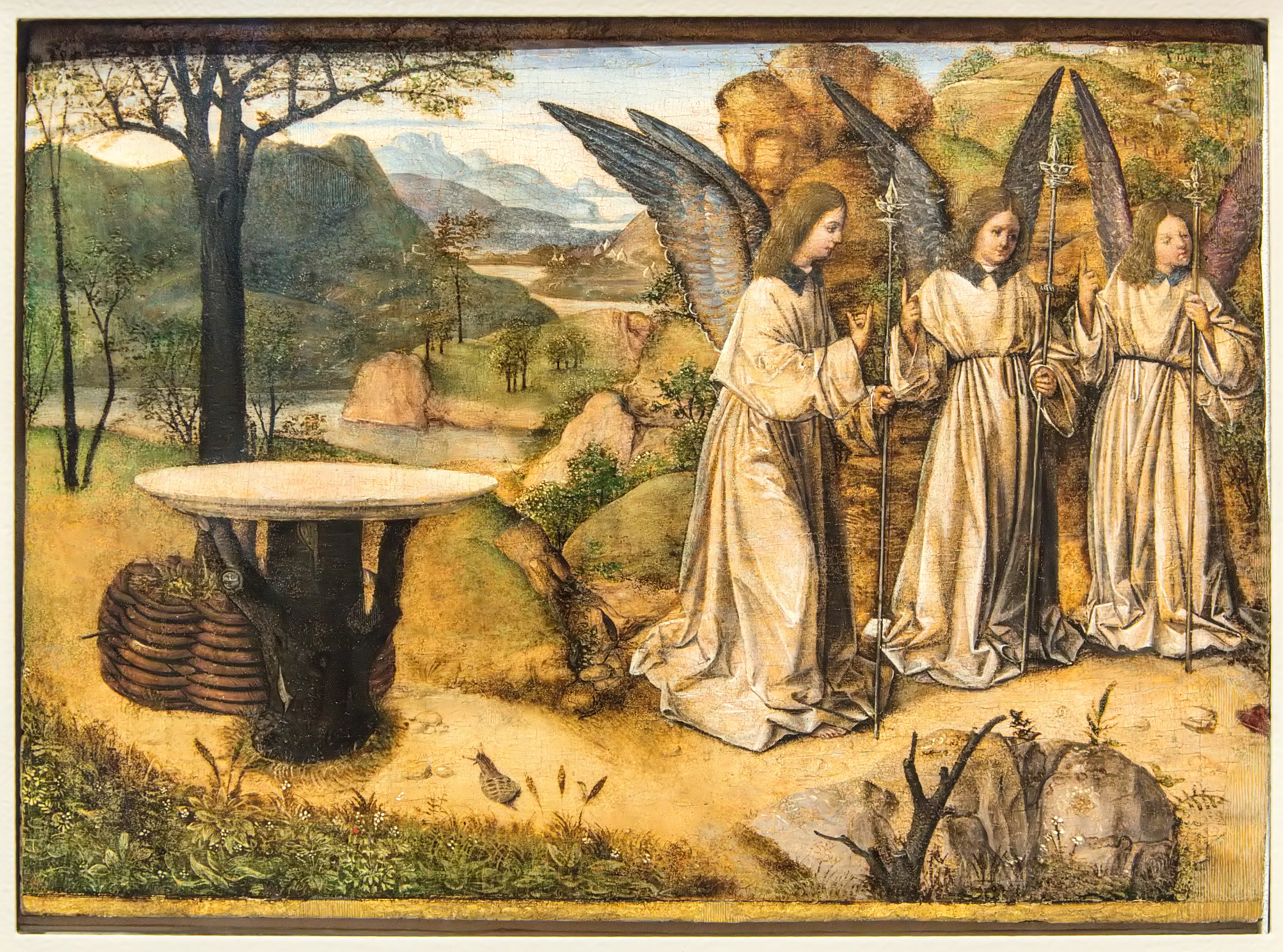
- Artist: Antonello da Messina
- Year: c. 1455
- Type: Various techniques on wood
- Dimensions: 21.4 cm × 29.3 cm (8.4 in × 11.5 in)
- Location: Pinacoteca Civica; Reggio Calabria

Saint Jerome Penitent and Abraham Served by Three Angels are two paintings by the Italian Renaissance painter Antonello da Messina. They are housed in the Pinacoteca Civica palace in Reggio Calabria, Italy.

These two panels are considered to be among the first works by Antonello da Messina. They were both intended for devotion of private owners.

== Saint Jerome Penitent ==
The painting shows elements inspired both the Flemish and Italian schools of painting. The rugged landscape is characteristic of the former, while the kneeling posture of Saint Jerome is typically Italian.

== Abraham Served by Three Angels ==
Because of its poor condition, for a long time this work was considered a part of a larger Nativity. The identification of theme was possible after the discovery of a small panel by a 15th-century French master (now at Denver) in which the scene is reproduced in its entirety, and which was surely known to the Italian master: the part missing in Antonello's work would show Sarah spying Abraham from the hut's door.

== See also ==
- Themes in Italian Renaissance painting

== Sources ==
- Barbera, K, ed. (2005). Antonello da Messina: Sicily's Renaissance master. New York: The Metropolitan Museum of Art.
