= Saint Sebastian (Antonello da Messina) =

Painting by Antonello da Messina

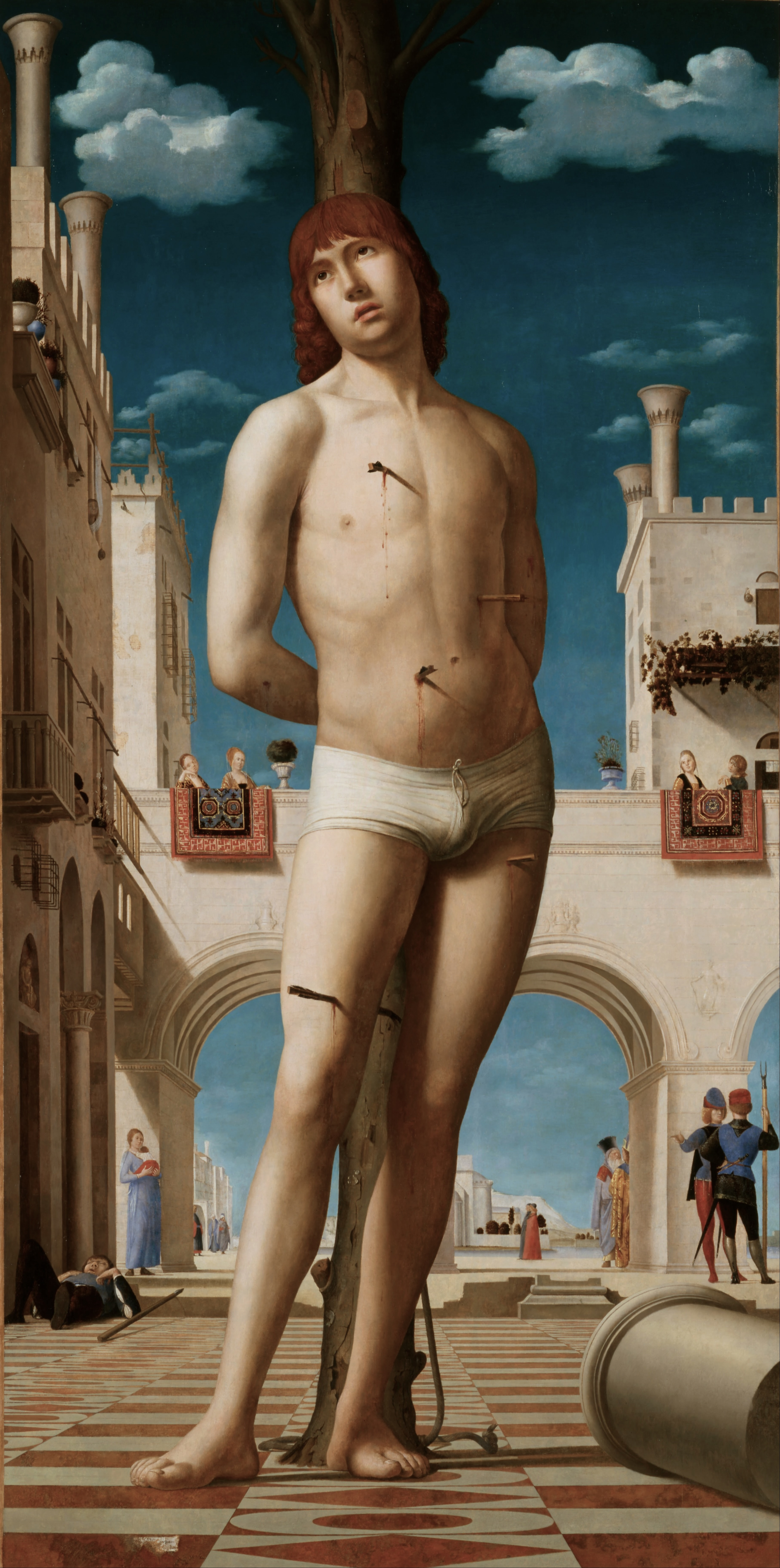
- Artist: Antonello da Messina
- Year: c. 1478
- Type: Oil on panel transferred to canvas
- Dimensions: 171 cm × 85.5 cm (67 in × 33.7 in)
- Location: Gemäldegalerie Alte Meister, Dresden

Saint Sebastian is a painting, once part of a triptych by the Italian Renaissance artist Antonello da Messina, completed in 1477–1479. It is housed in the Gemäldegalerie Alte Meister, Dresden, Germany.

== History ==
The visit of the Sicilian artist Antonello da Messina to Venice in 1475–1476 has traditionally been seen as turning point in the history of the city's painting, Giorgio Vasari crediting him with introducing oil painting to Venice. Antonello painted two altarpieces for Venetian churches, one for the church of San Cassiano, and the other, of which the Saint Sebastian once formed part, for the altar of the Scuola di San Rocca in the parish church of San Giuliano. It has often been assumed to have been painted in Venice in 1476, but it may have been painted only after Antonello's return to Sicily in the autumn of that year. A description by Francesco Sansovino, dating from 1581, indicates that the altarpiece consisted of a wooden statue of Saint Roch, flanked by painted panels showing Saints Christopher and Sebastian. Sansovino describes the panel of Saint Christopher as being by Antonello, and that of Saint Sebastian as being by "Pino da Messina" (i.e., his son Jacobello or "Jacopino"). However, art historians have generally accepted Antonello's authorship of the Saint Sebastian. The statue and the painting of Saint Christopher are now lost.

== Description ==
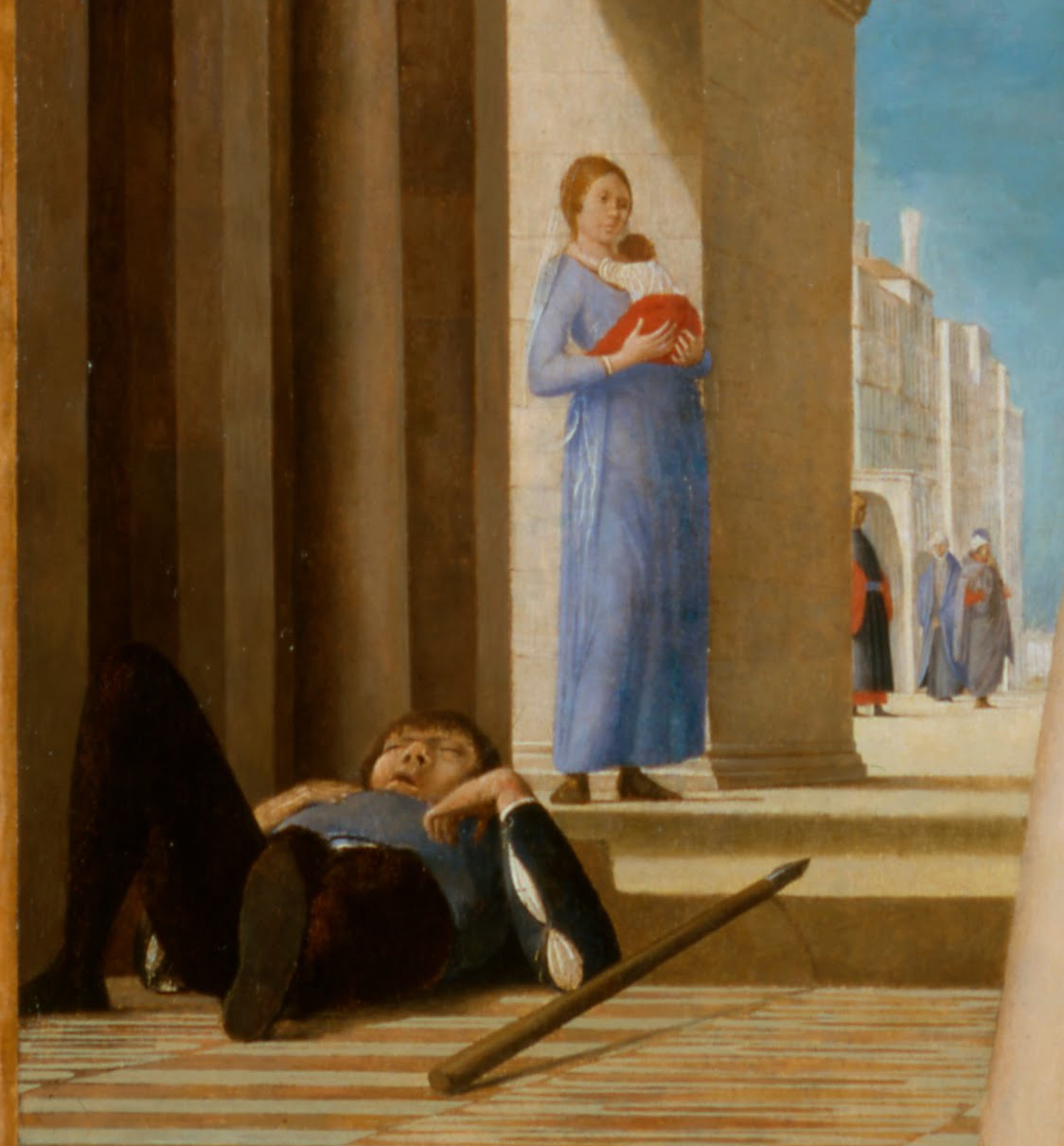
Detail

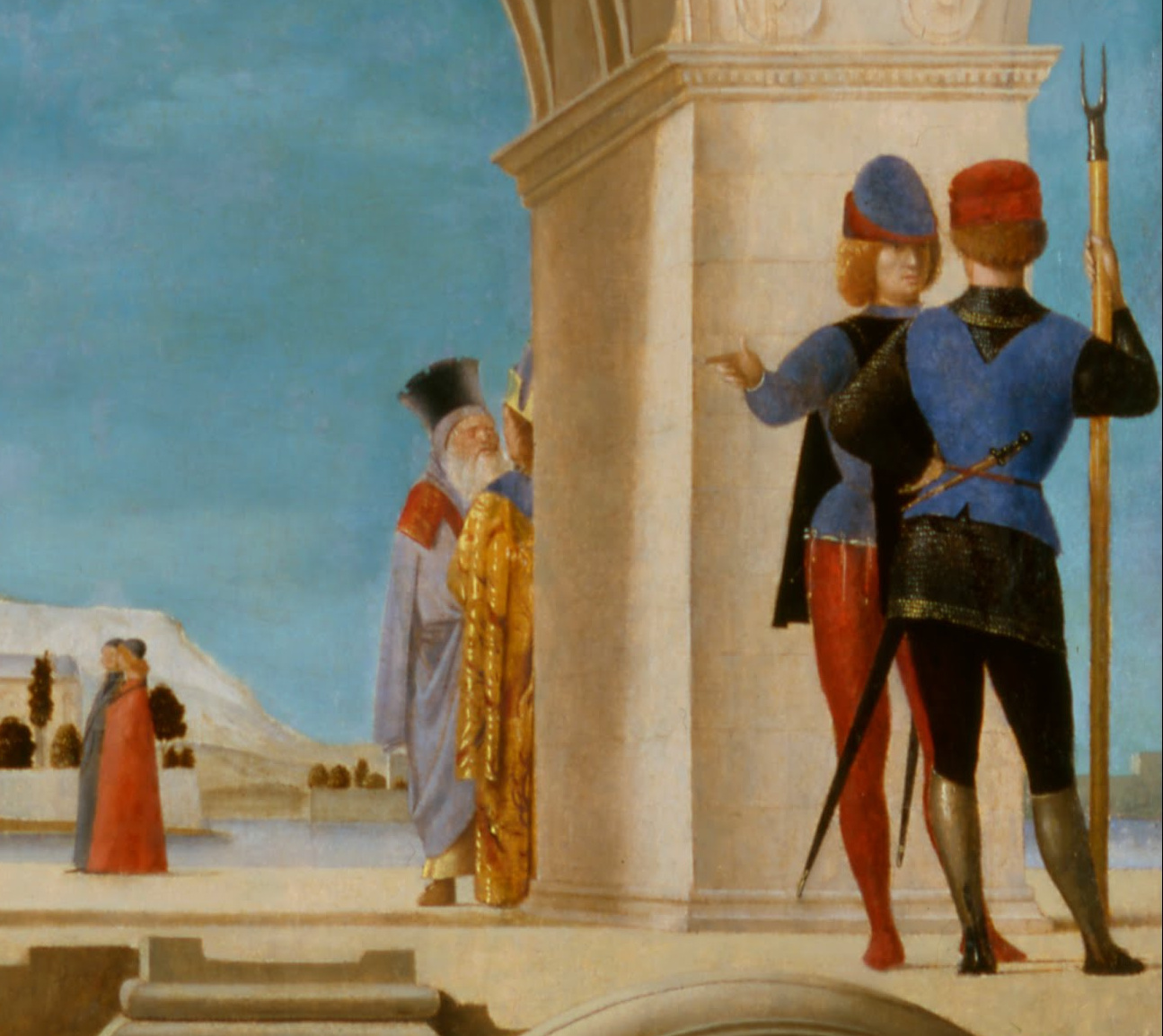
Detail

This picture, dominated by the vertical figure of the saint, shows a marked influence by Piero della Francesca: this can be seen in particular in the perspective of the floor and in the "mathematical" disposition of the figurative elements. Original to Antonello is the smooth rendering of the body of Saint Sebastian (defying any geometrical breaking down) and the passion for the details of landscape, seen for example in the work of Umbrian painters such as Carlo Crivelli.

Famous details include the man reclining on the left, the typical Venetian-style chimneys, the columns and the monumental appearance of the buildings (probably inspired by some of Mantegna's works) and the debating pairs of men on the right side, forming an interesting mixing of late Gothic elements with Venetian, Flemish and advanced Renaissance ones.

== Sources ==
- Humfrey, Peter (1993). The Altarpiece in Renaissance Venice. New Haven and London: Yale University Press. ISBN 0-300-05358-4.
