= Salting Madonna =

Painting attributed to Antonello da Messina

Madonna with Child (Salting Madonna)
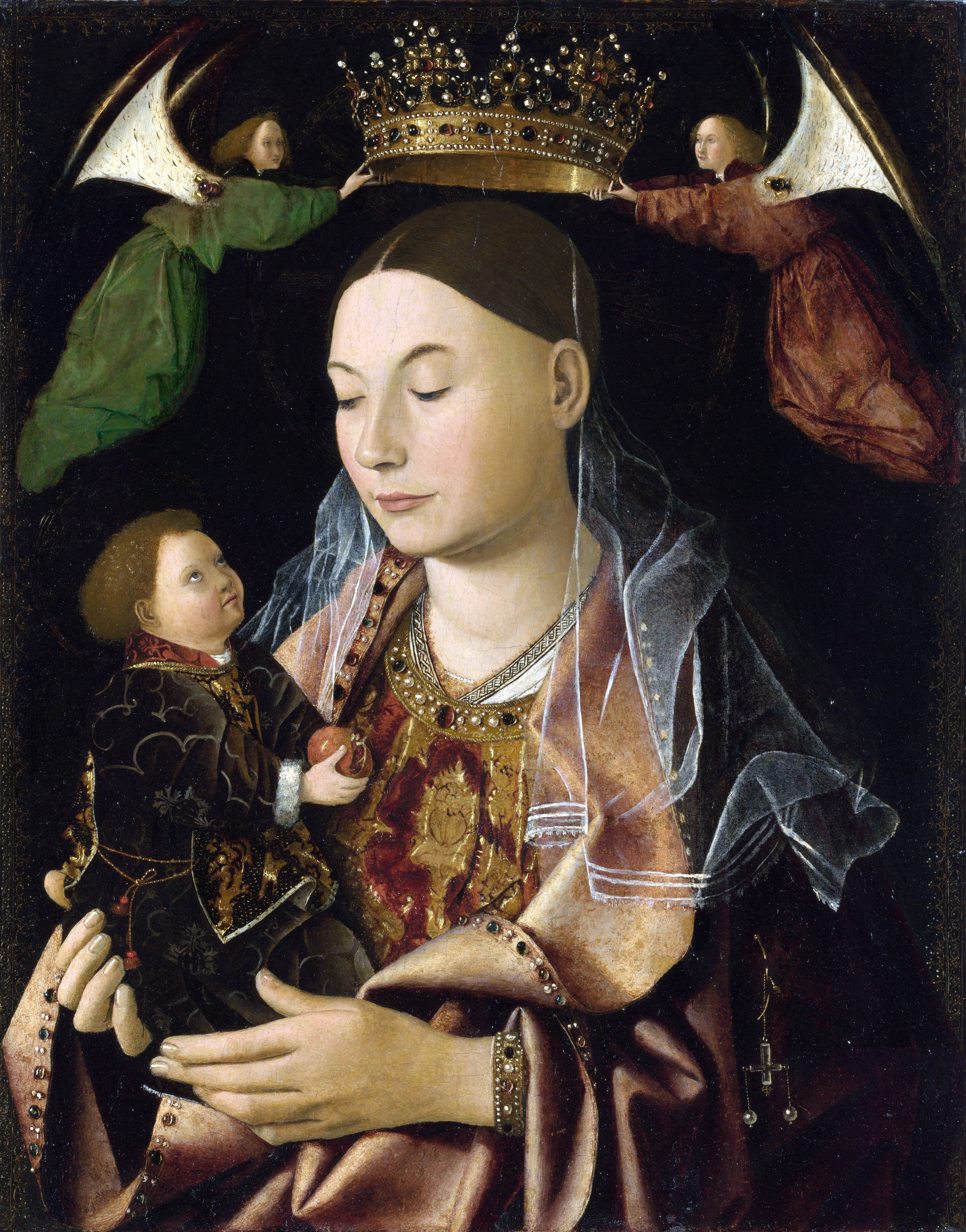
- Artist: Possibly by Antonello da Messina
- Year: c. 1460s
- Type: Various techniques on wood
- Dimensions: 43.2 cm × 34.3 cm (17.0 in × 13.5 in)
- Location: National Gallery; London
- Accession: NG2618
- Website: www.nationalgallery.org.uk/paintings/possibly-by-antonello-da-messina-the-virgin-and-child

The Madonna with Child (Salting Madonna) is a painting attributed on basis of style to the early Italian Renaissance master Antonello da Messina, depicting the Madonna holding the doll-like Child and wearing an ornate golden crown, held by angels over her head. It is housed in the National Gallery, London. The name Salting, which is also applied to a Madonna by Robert Campin, denotes George Salting, the collector who donated it to the gallery in 1910.

== Painting ==
The Salting Madonna shows a complex series of cultural references that in the past have led scholars to classify it variously as a Flemish, Spanish or even Russian work. It is believed to be one of Antonello's earlier works, dating most likely from the 1460s, when the artist was still in Sicily. It portrays the Madonna adorned with a series of well-crafted and rendered details, such as the crown and the Venetian-style garments and gossamer veil. The Madonna has the attributes of Mary, mother of Christ. The crown with two angels represents her also as the Queen of Heaven. The Child holds a pomegranate in his hands, which symbolize the Passion of Christ.

The abstract beauty of the Madonna's face derives from the style of contemporary Provençal artists, especially Enguerrand Quarton.

== See also ==
- Italian Renaissance painting, development of themes
