= Male portraits by Antonello da Messina =

Several male portraits by the Italian Renaissance artist Antonello da Messina

Portrait of a Man is the conventional title of several male portraits by the Italian Renaissance artist Antonello da Messina.

== Portrait of a Man (Pavia) ==
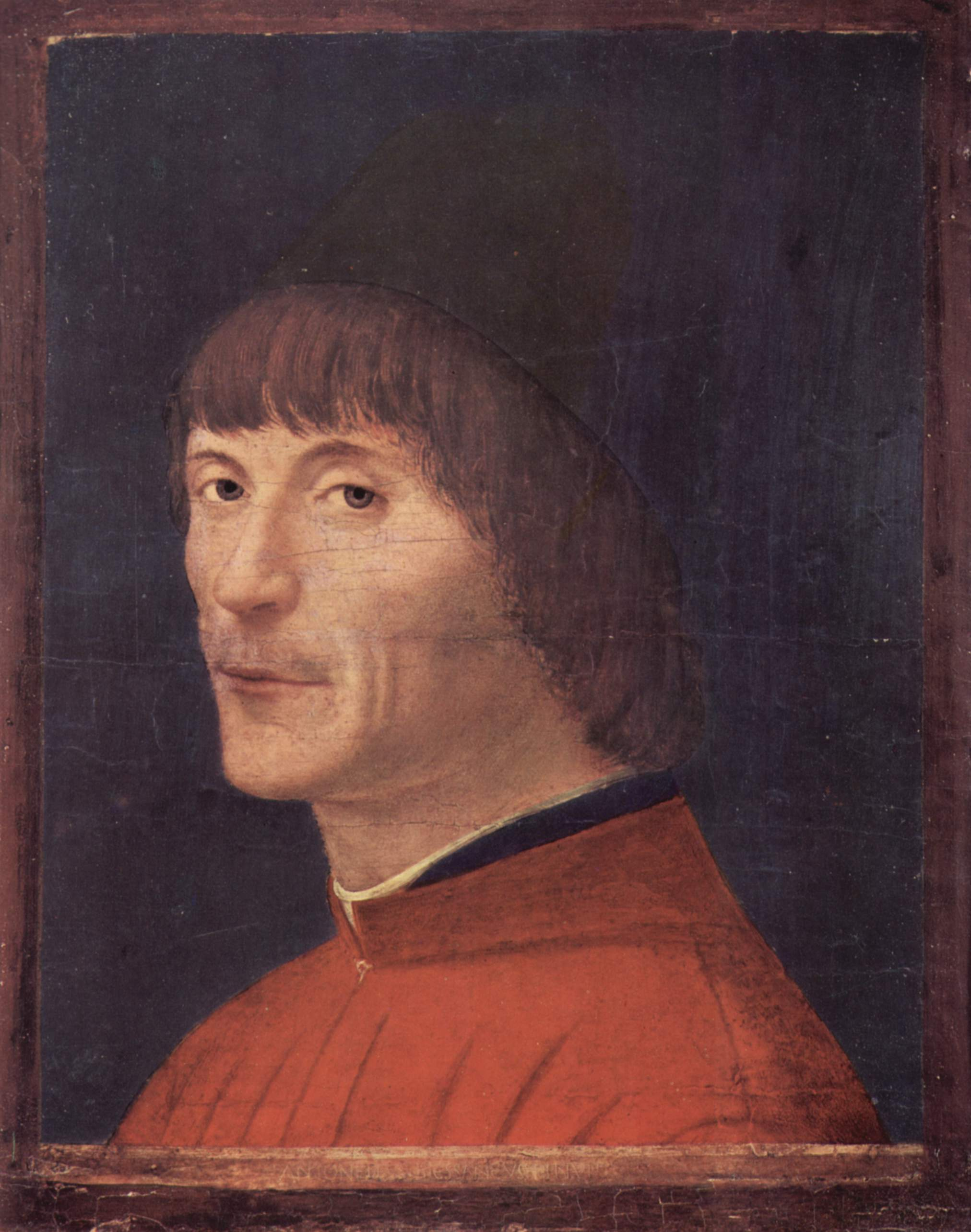
1460s (Pavia)

One such painting is in the Civic Museums of Pavia, in Lombardy in northern Italy. It is signed in the Flemish manner by directly engraving the painter's name on the parapet in the lower foreground (instead of using a false glued panel), as with the Madrid portrait. Despite the sign, the similarity to Flemish portrait paintings and the poor state of preservation have caused some scholars to doubt the attribution to Antonello. The work has been dated to the 1460s based on the fashion of the subject's dress and headgear.

== Portrait of a Man (Madrid) ==
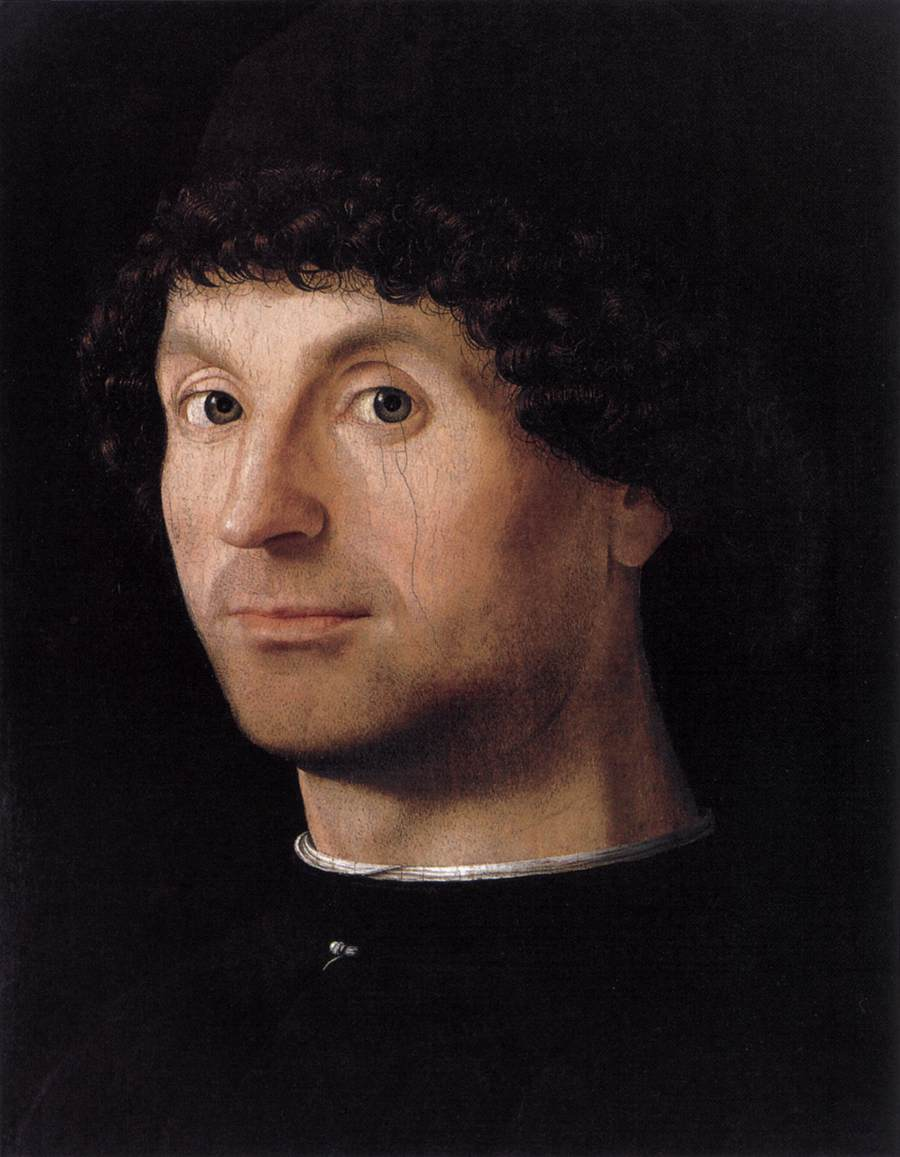
c. 1475 (Madrid)

Another painting, executed in c. 1475, is housed in the Museo Thyssen-Bornemisza in Madrid. Among Antonello's portraits, it is among the most expressively animated. The subject, a young man, is drawn from a quite near point of view, with the master's usual skill in rendering detail.

The work has been dated approximately to the early 1470s, based on the typical "zuccotto" headgear, a fashion more characteristic of 1460s Italy.

== Portrait of a Man (Turin) ==
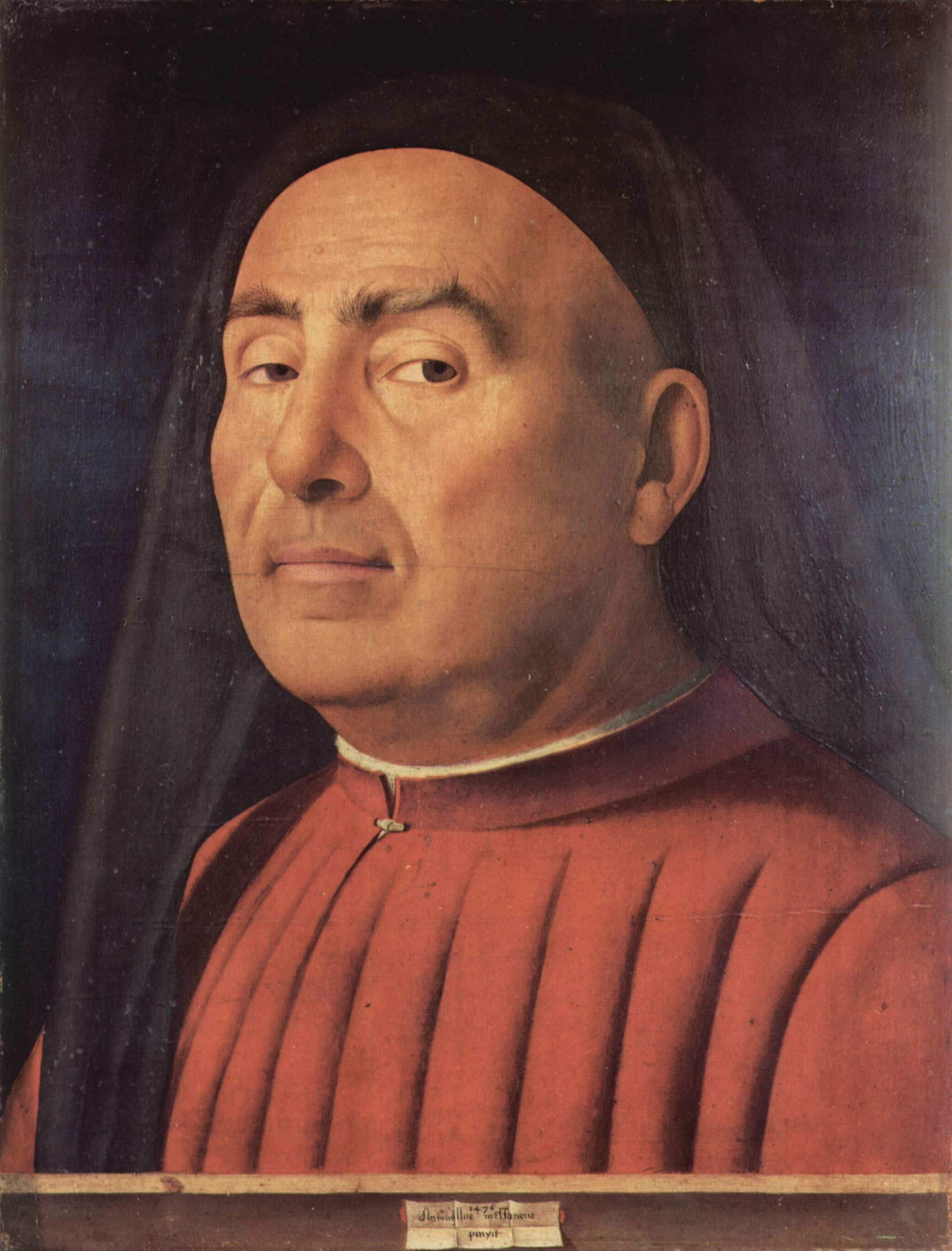
1476 (Turin)

Often called the Trivulzio portrait, this portrait is housed in the Turin City Museum of Ancient Art. It is signed by Antonello and dated 1476. It was part of the Florentine noble family Rinuccini's collection, which was later acquired by the Trivulzio. In 1935 the collection was scattered, although most of the material went to Milan. The Turin museum obtained this portrait and the Turin–Milan Hours.

== Portrait of a Man (London) ==
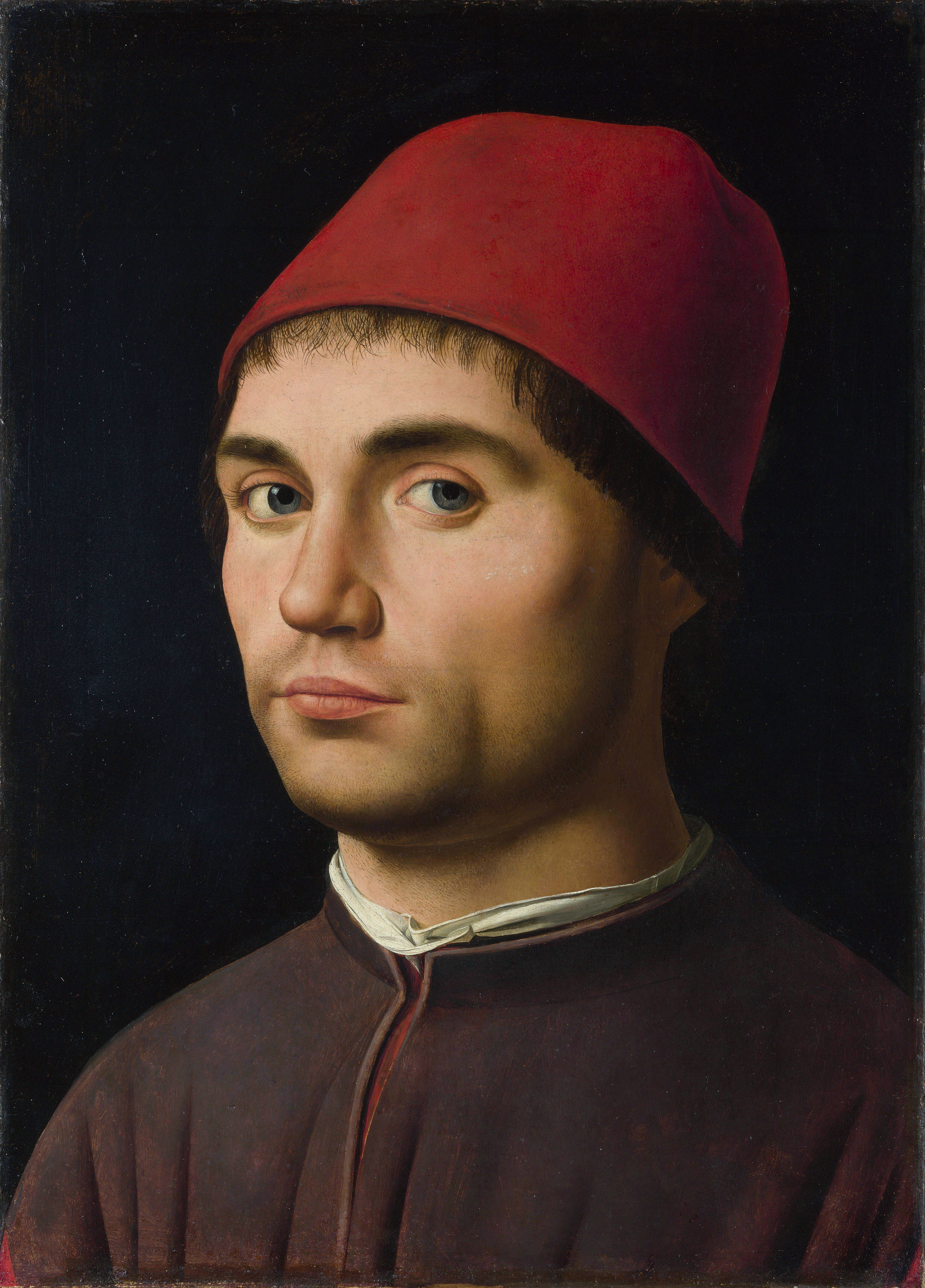
c. 1476 (London)

Portrait of a Man is an oil painting of c. 1476 in the National Gallery, London. It was reproduced on the Italian 5,000 lire note issued from 1979 to 1983.

The work portrays an unknown man, whose garments belonged to the "middle-upper class" of the time. He wears a leather blouse, under which a white shirt is visible, and a red cloth beret.

The man is depicted from three-quarters, a departure from the custom of the time. The dark background and the essential composition are derived from Early Netherlandish painting, such as the work of the Flemish painter Petrus Christus, whom Antonello knew personally in Italy.

X-ray analysis has proved that the eyes originally looked in a different direction. There may also once have been a parapet, later cut off, which bore the artist's signature. It has been suggested that this late work could be a self-portrait.

== Other portraits ==
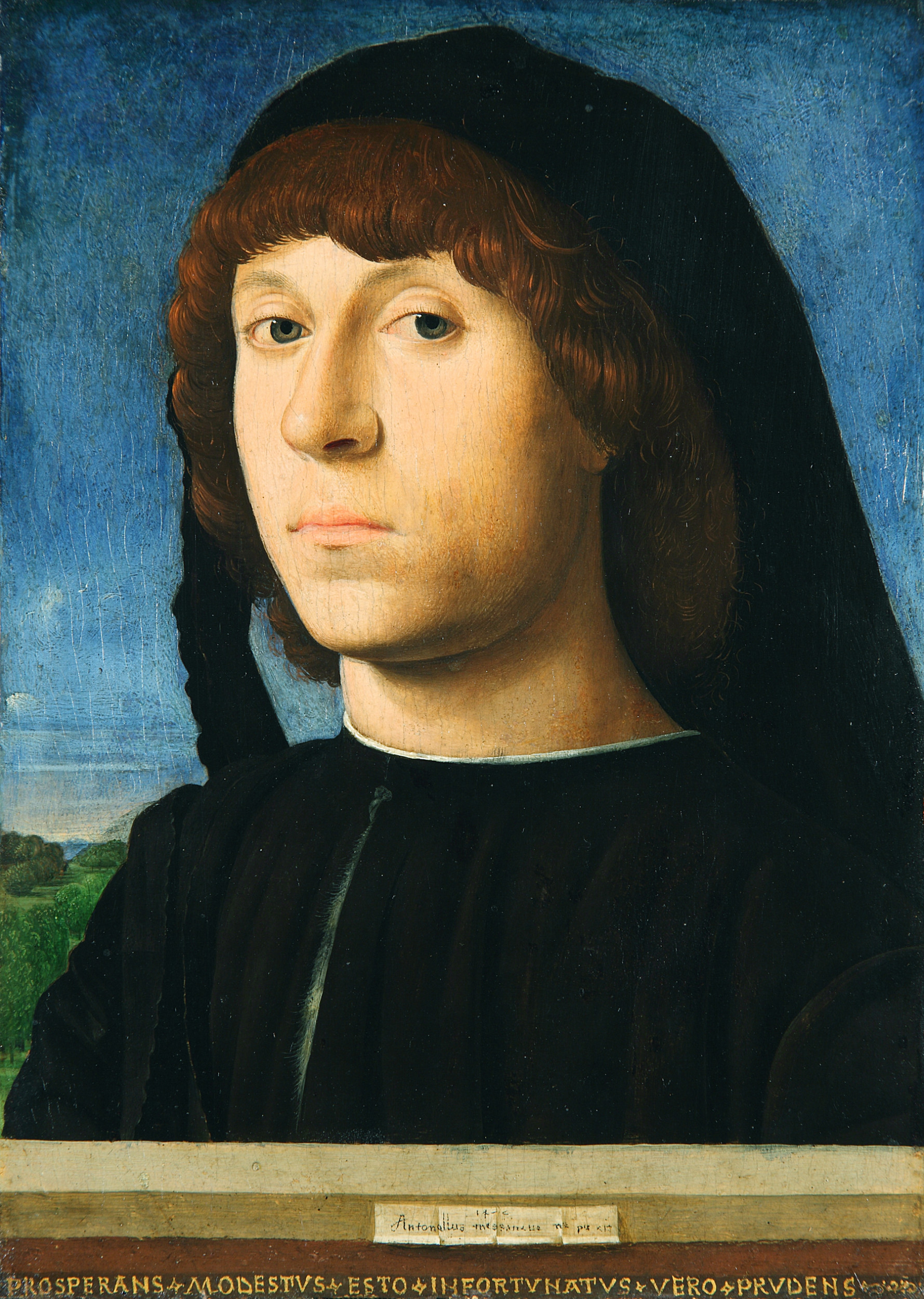
1478 (Berlin)

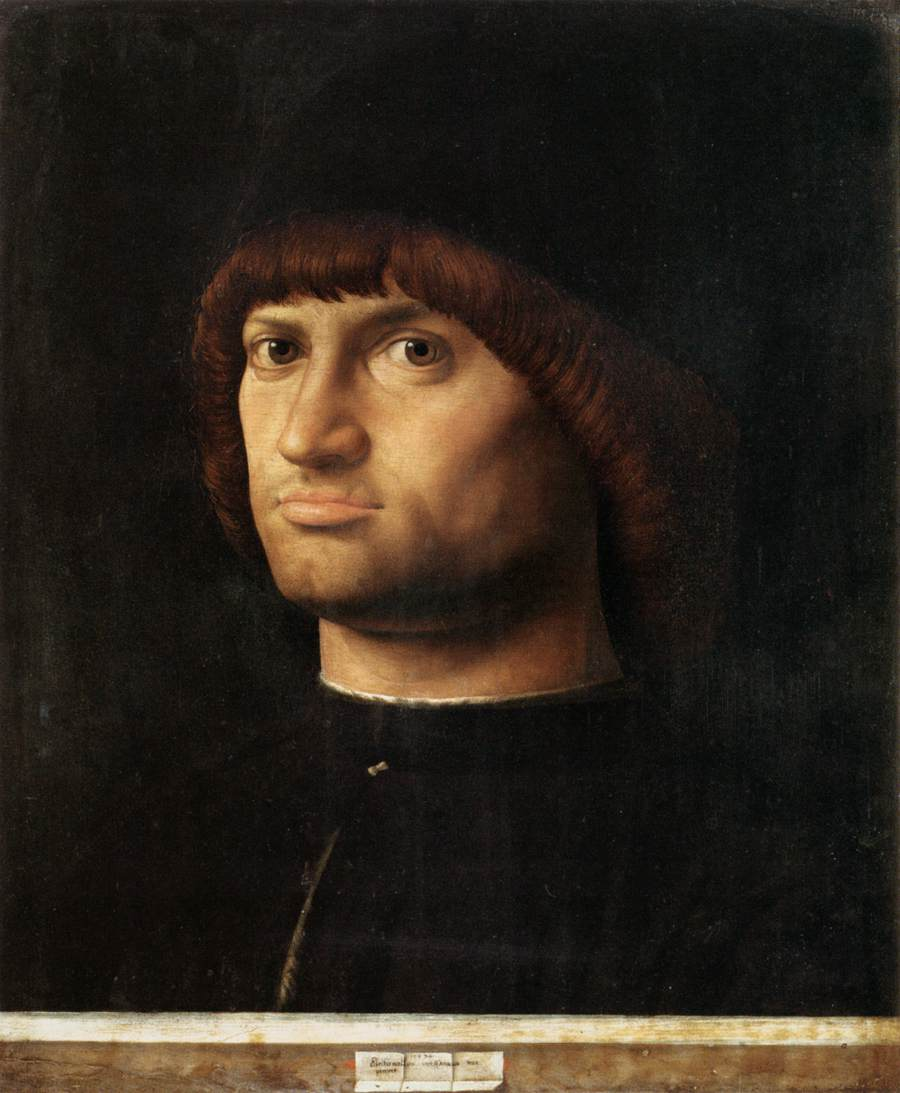
1475 The Condottiero (Paris)

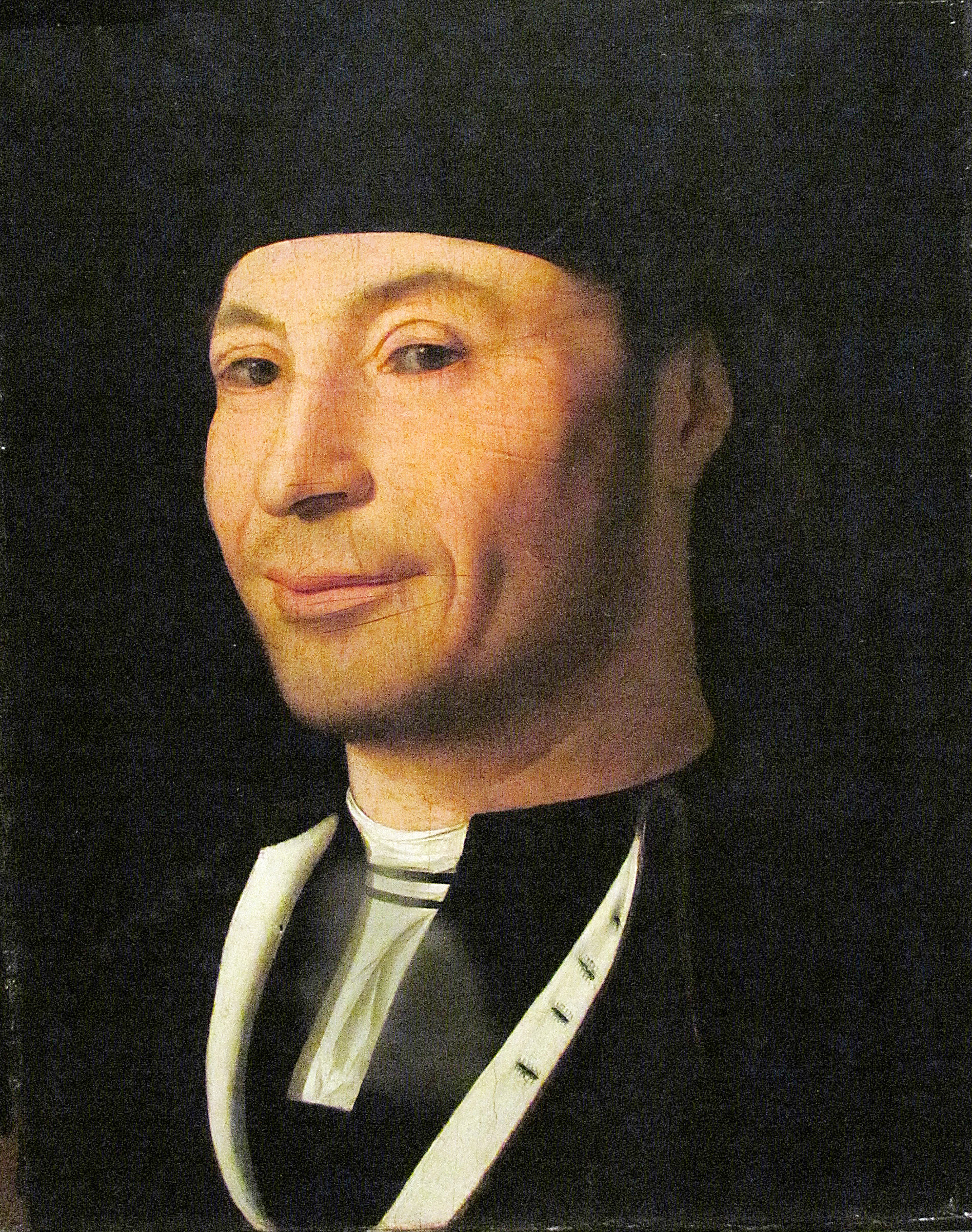
1460s Cefalu Portrait

- Portrait of a Man, Gemäldegalerie, Berlin
- Portrait of a Man, Galleria Borghese, Rome
- The portrait usually known as The Condottiero in the Louvre, Paris

== Sources ==
- De Vecchi, Pierluigi; Elda Cerchiari (1999). I tempi dell'arte. Milan: Bompiani. ISBN 88-451-7212-0.
