= Ecce Homo (Antonello da Messina) =

Painting series by Antonello da Messina

Ecce Homo is the title of a series of paintings by the Italian Renaissance master Antonello da Messina. They date from 1470 to 1475.

== Paintings ==
Antonello is known to have treated this subject four times; three (b, c, d) are variations of the same design; a fourth (a) differs.

- a) Christ Crowned with Thorns, in the collection of Gaspar Méndez de Haro, 7th Marquis of Carpio in 1687; Don Giulio Alliata, Palermo, 1698, when it was said to bear the date 1470, now illegible; ...Michael Friedsam, New York; Metropolitan Museum of Art, acc. no.32.100.82.
- b) Picture Gallery of Collegio Alberoni, Piacenza, dated 1472.
- c) Kunsthistorisches Museum, Vienna, dated 1474.
- d) National Gallery of the Palazzo Spinola, Genoa.
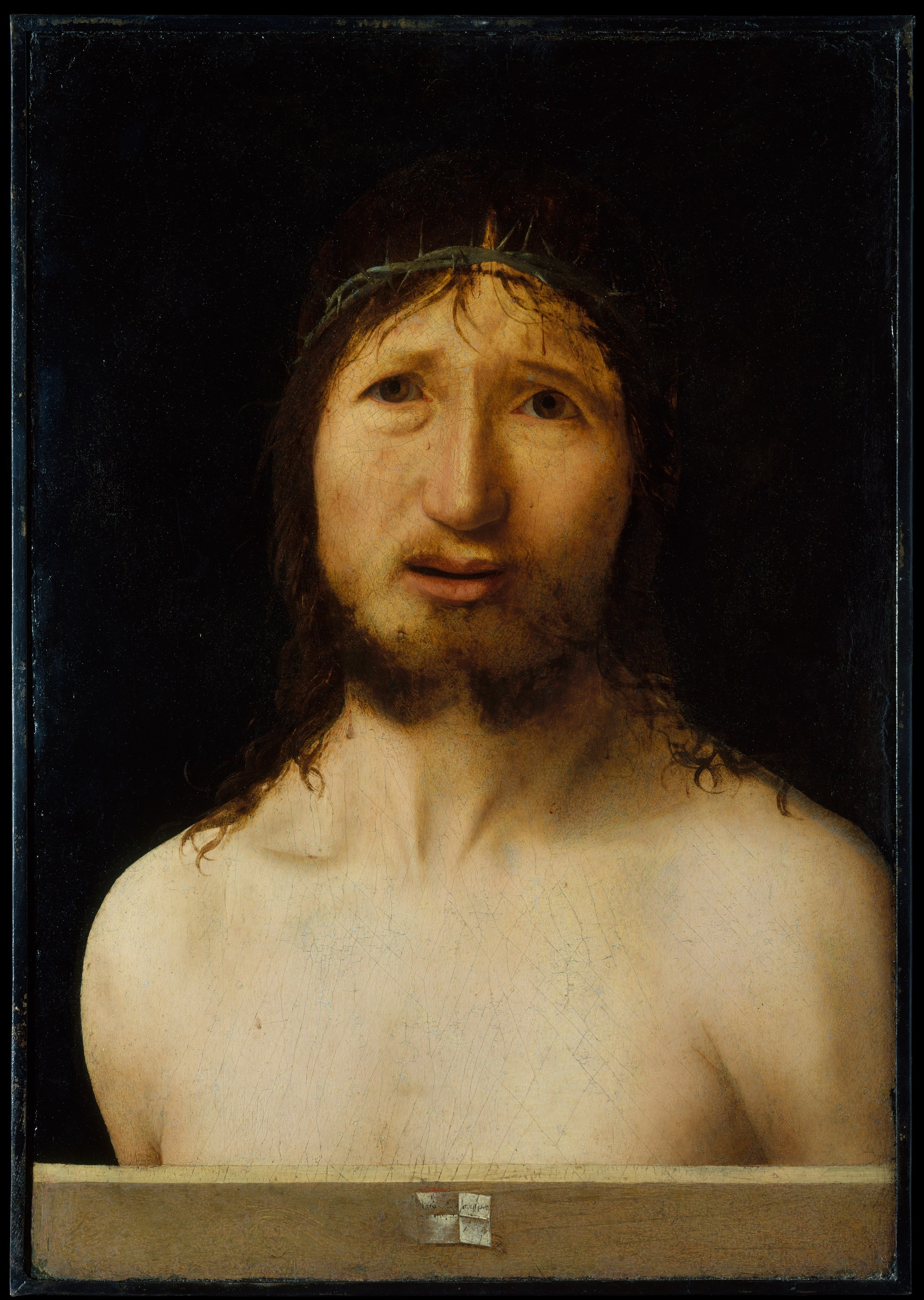
c. 1470, Metropolitan Museum of Art

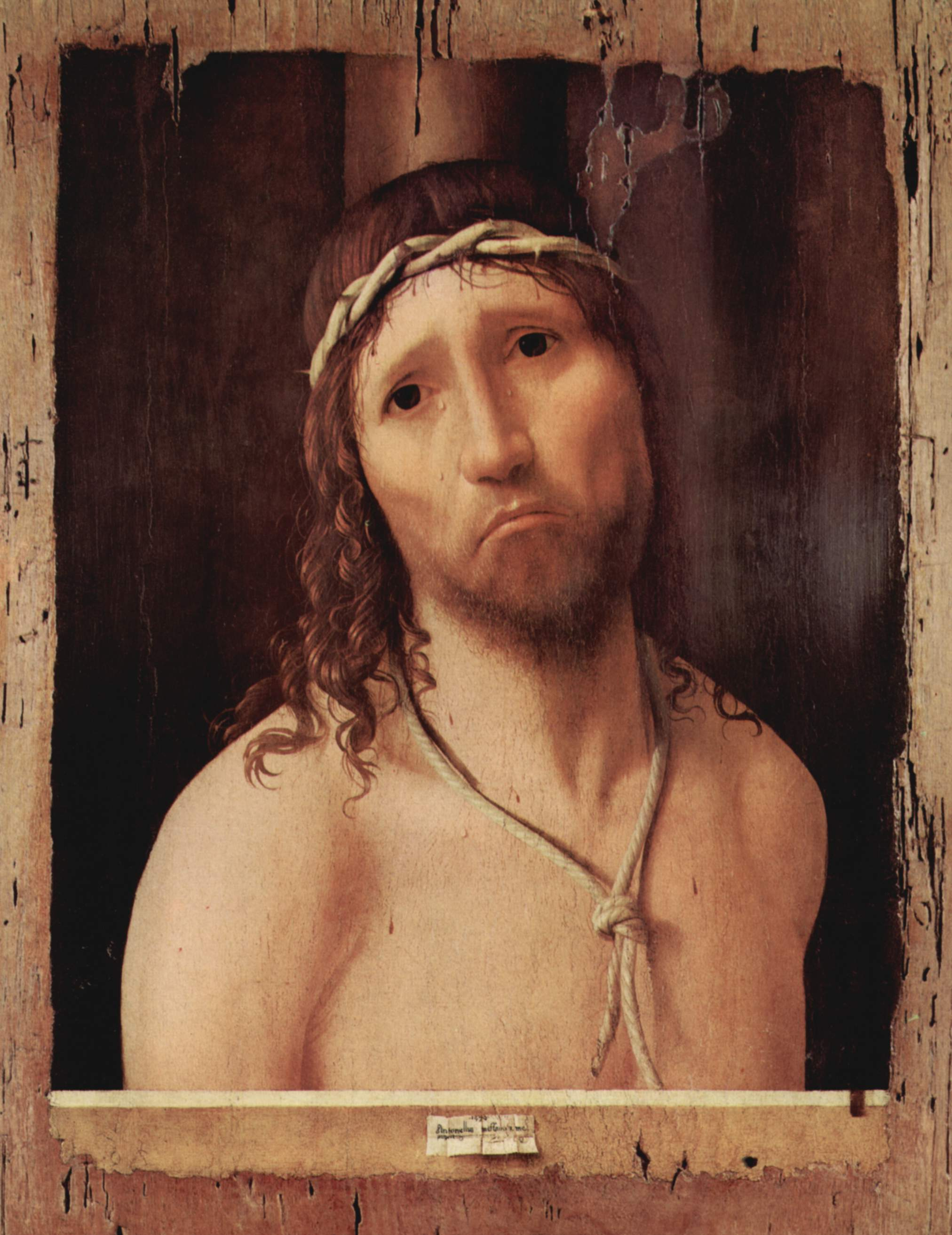
1475, Piacenza

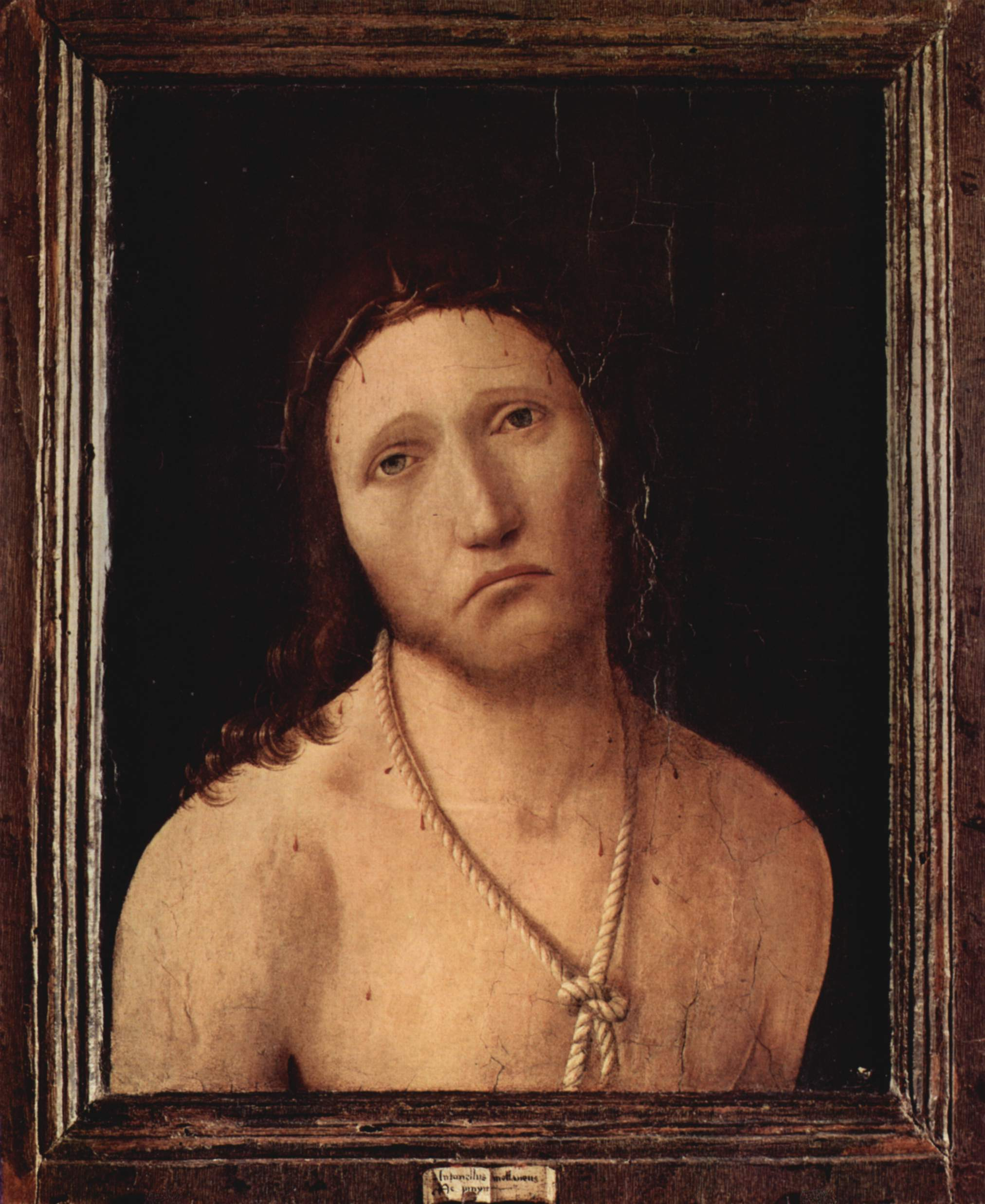
Palazzo Spinola, Genoa

== See also ==
- Italian Renaissance painting, development of themes
