= Crucifixion (Antonello da Messina) =

Paintings by Antonello da Messina

The Sibiu Crucifixion
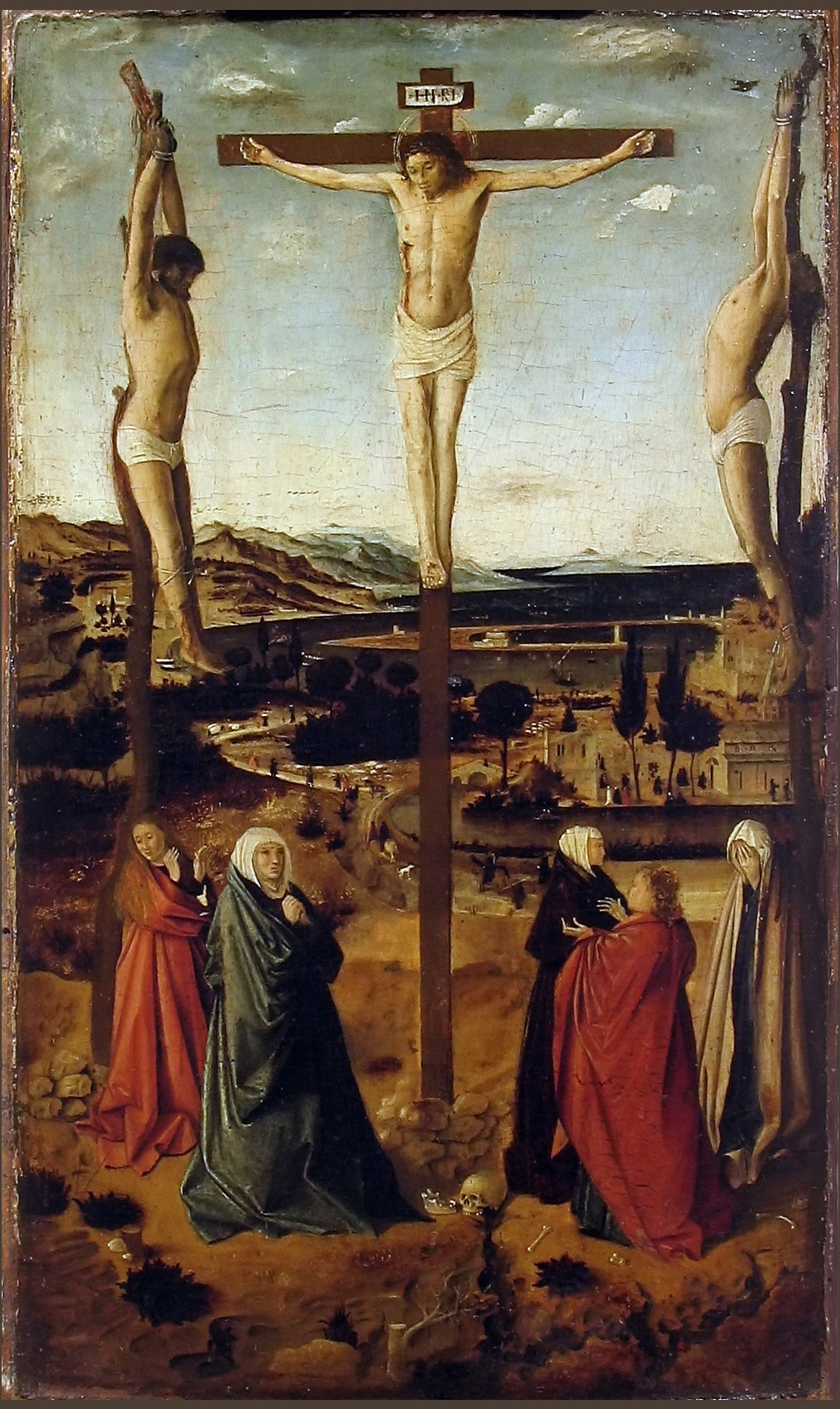
- Artist: Antonello da Messina
- Year: 1454-1455
- Type: Oil on wood
- Dimensions: 39 cm × 23.5 cm (15 in × 9.3 in)
- Location: Brukenthal National Museum Sibiu, Romania

The Crucifixion is the subject of three different paintings by the Italian Renaissance master Antonello da Messina; the first one was completed around 1454/1455, the second and the third in 1475. They are housed in the Brukenthal National Museum (Sibiu, Romania); the Royal Museum of Fine Arts Antwerp (Antwerp, Belgium) and in the National Gallery (London, England), respectively.

== The Sibiu Crucifixion ==
An early work appearing to be influenced by the Flemish school, the Sibiu Crucifixion was formerly attributed to an unknown 14th century German painter. A symbolic view of Messina is depicted in the background, probably an allusion to Jerusalem as requested by the unknown client, in a typical fashion of the time.

The Antwerp Crucifixion
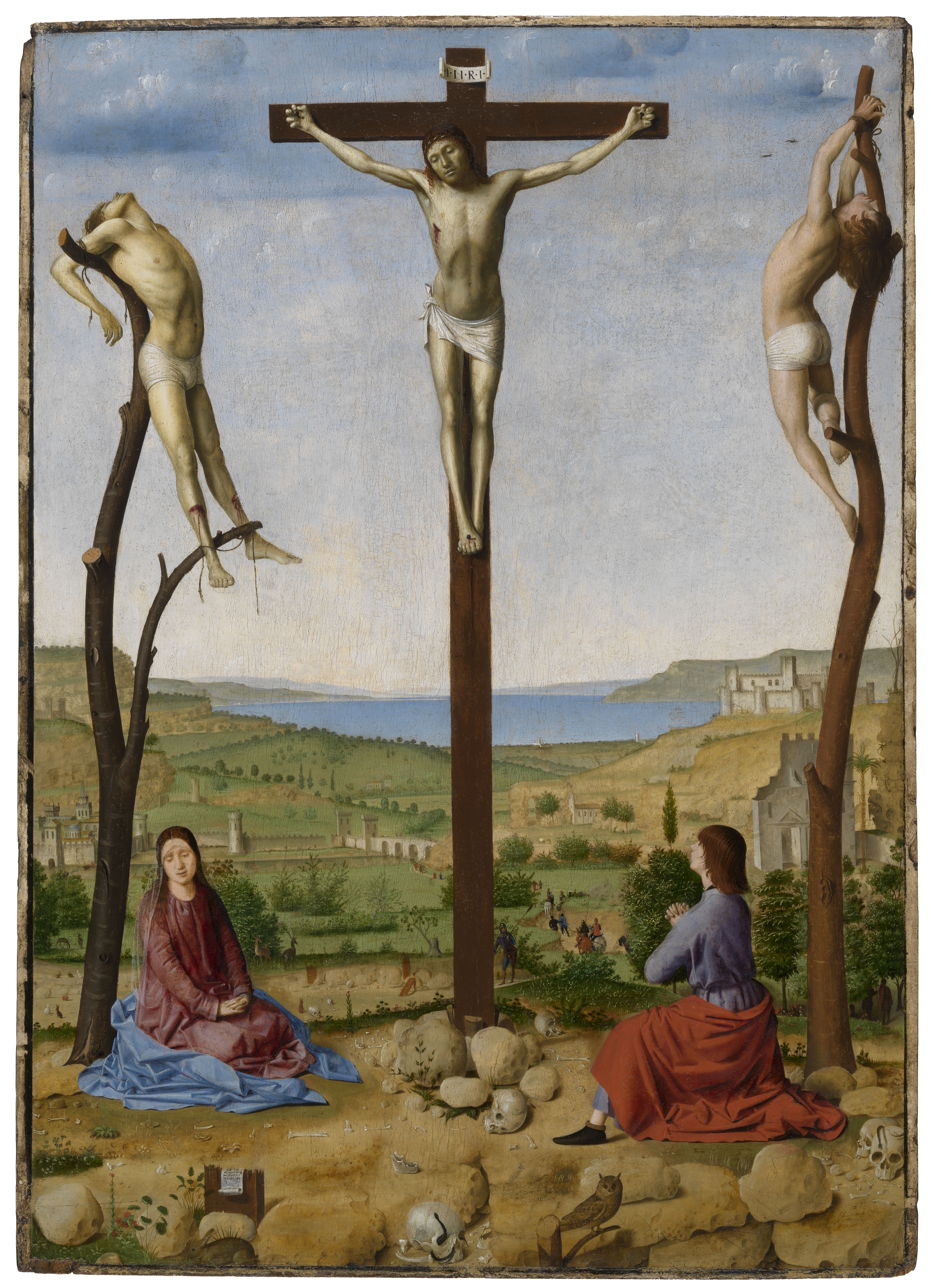
- Artist: Antonello da Messina
- Year: 1475
- Type: Oil on wood
- Dimensions: 59.7 cm × 42.5 cm (23.5 in × 16.7 in)
- Location: Royal Museum of Fine Arts, Antwerp Antwerp, Belgium

== The Antwerp Crucifixion ==
The Antwerp Crucifixion represents Christ crucified between two evil-doers, with Mary and John the Evangelist seated on the ground. The work shows a landscape typical of the Flemish school in the lower part; the well devised spatial disposition of the crosses in the upper half demonstrates a full knowledge of the innovative method of perspective known to Italian art of the period. The Italian scholar Roberto Longhi asserted that the upper part was added several years later. At the bottom left the painter wrote his name on a scroll and the date: 1475.

The London Crucifixion
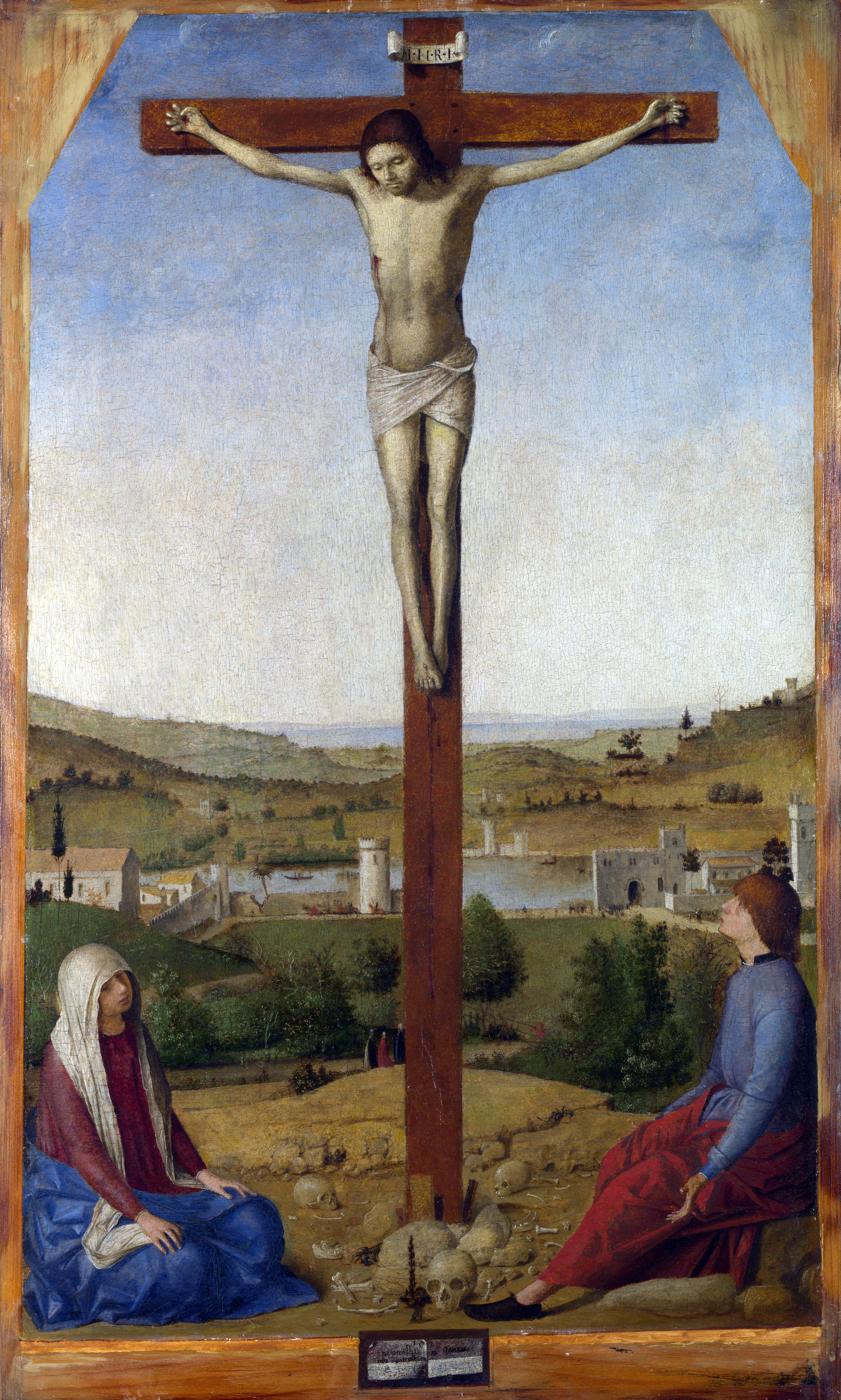
- Artist: Antonello da Messina
- Year: 1475
- Type: Oil on wood
- Dimensions: 42 cm × 25.5 cm (17 in × 10.0 in)
- Location: National Gallery London, England

== The London Crucifixion ==
Belonging to a later phase, the London Crucifixion is one of the few paintings signed and dated by Antonello: "1475/antonellus messaneus/me pinxit". The geometrical composition is divided in two parts by the cross and the lake in the background, with the Virgin on the left and St. John on the right.
