= Virgin Annunciate (Antonello da Messina, Palermo) =

Painting by Antonello da Messina

The Virgin Annunciate
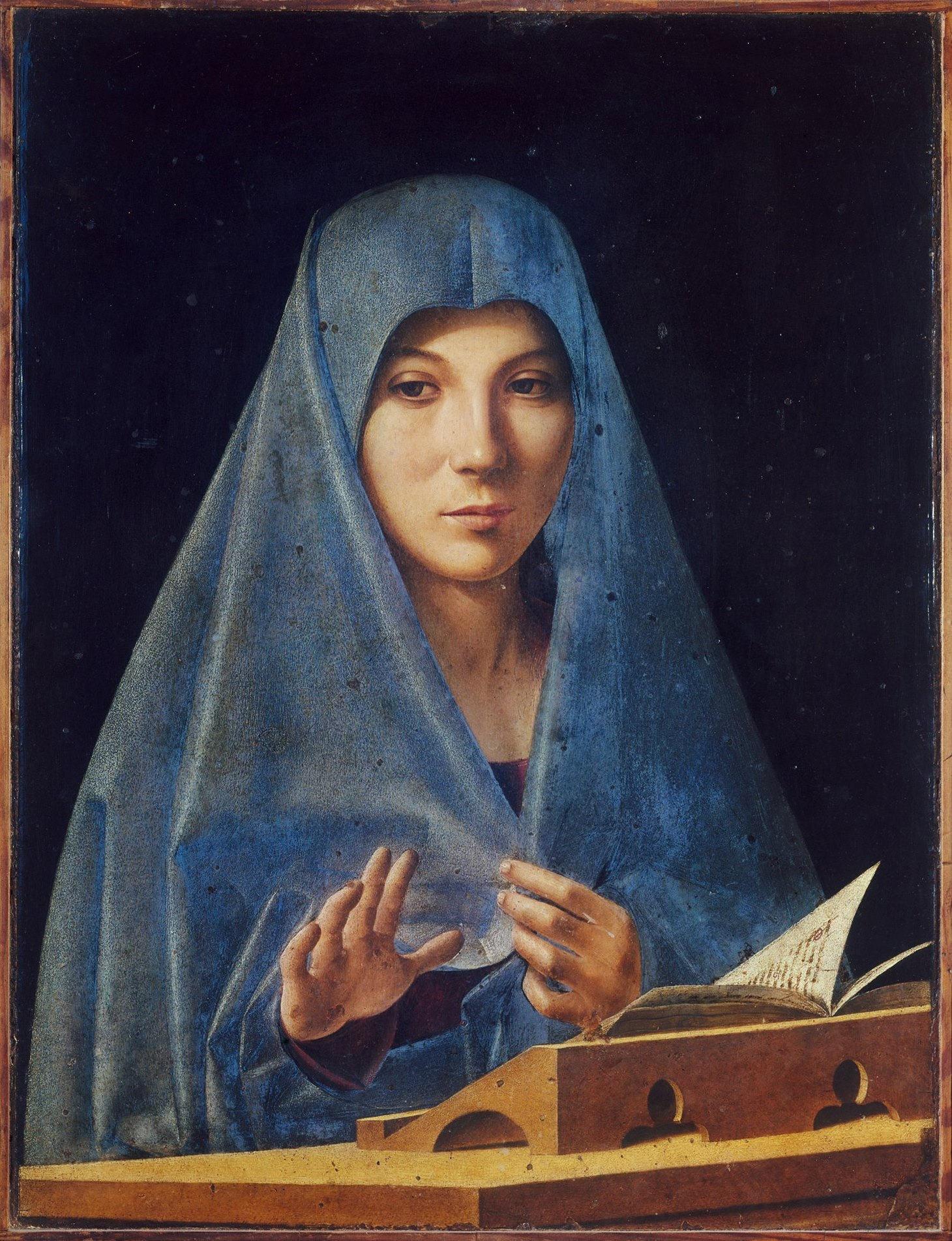
- Artist: Antonello da Messina
- Year: c. 1476
- Medium: Oil on wood
- Dimensions: 45 cm × 34.5 cm (18 in × 13.6 in)
- Location: Palazzo Abatellis; Palermo

The Virgin Annunciate is a painting by the Italian Renaissance artist Antonello da Messina, housed in the Palazzo Abatellis, Palermo, region of Sicily, Italy. Probably painted in Sicily in 1476, it shows Mary interrupted at her reading by the Angel of the Annunciation. It is painted in oil on panel, a technique introduced to Italy by its artist, who had learned it from North European artists such as Petrus Christus - by thus abandoning tempera technique he was able to produce the finely detailed works typical of him.

"The painting was bequeathed to the Museo Nazionale (later, the Palazzo Abatellis) in 1906 by the Cavaliere Di Giovanni, who had purchased it from the Colluzio family in Palermo..."

== Analysis ==
As is typical in individual portraits by the same artist, Mary is shown three-quarter-length. He had used the blue cloak in the shape of two triangles a year earlier in another work on the same subject now in Munich's Alte Pinakothek. Mary is shown looking out of the picture, not at the viewer but an unseen archangel Gabriel out of frame to the left, thus allowing the painter to dispense with also painting Gabriel.

The unusually simple depiction of Mary dispenses with the lush brocade folds in Antonello's later works and the gold background used by earlier artists, showing her simply as a young Jewish woman surprised by the archangel's words. With its few heavy folds, her simple woollen garment anticipates the High Renaissance, whilst the diagonally placed lectern seems to break out of the picture plane and open up to the viewer.

The image's symmetrical rigour draws on Piero della Francesca, whose works Antonello had seen in Urbino in the 1460s. The restrained palette and simple background are also notable, focussing the viewer's attention on Mary's emotions.
