= Antonello da Messina =

Italian painter (died 1479)

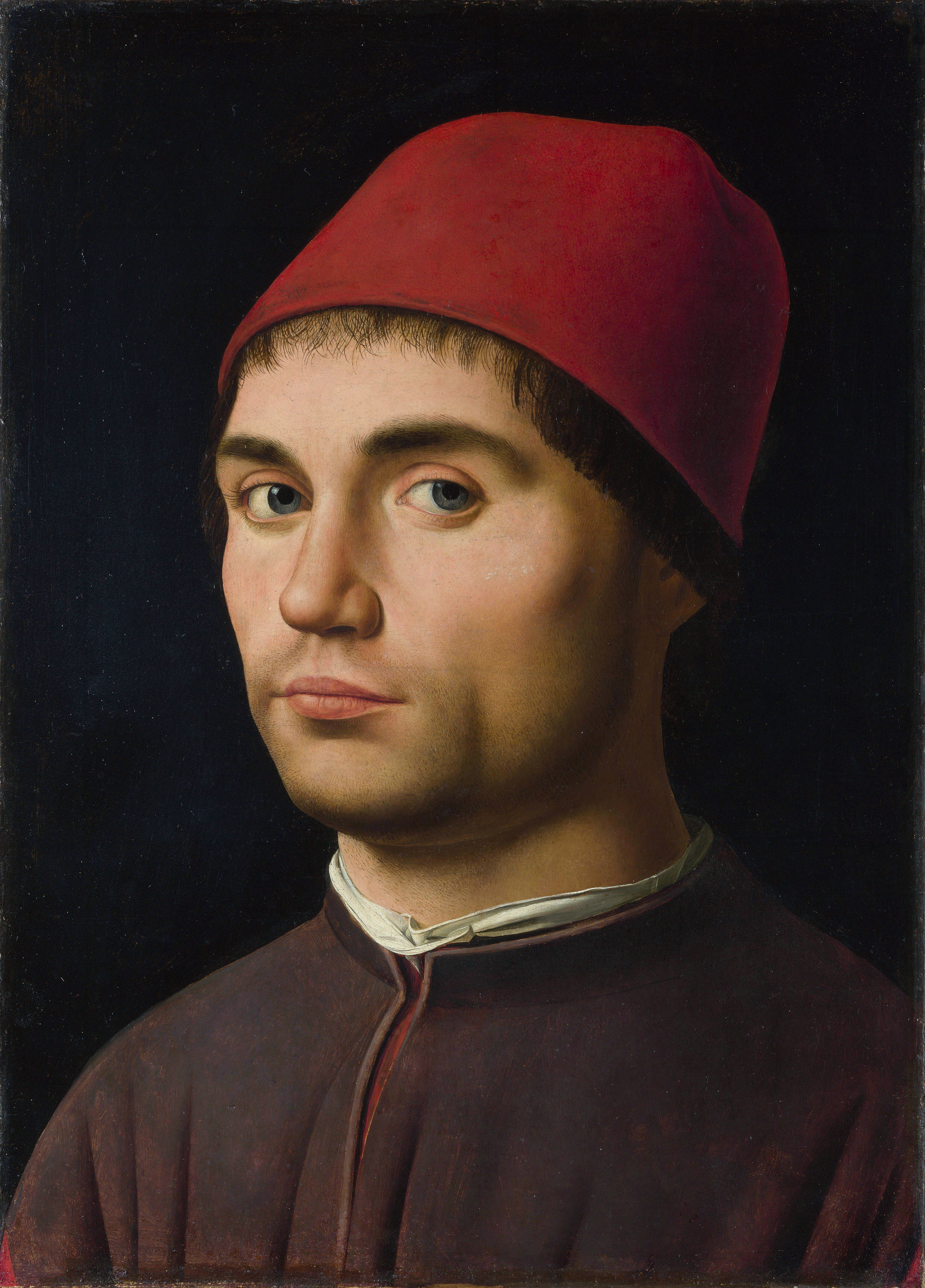
- Portrait of a Man, possibly a self-portrait
- Born: Antonello di Giovanni di Antonio c. 1425–1430; Messina, Kingdom of Sicily
- Died: February 1479 (aged 48–49); Messina, Kingdom of Sicily
- Known for: Painting
- Movement: Italian Renaissance

Antonello da Messina (Italian pronunciation: [antoˈnɛllo da (m)mesˈsiːna]; c. 1425–1430 – February 1479), properly Antonello di Giovanni di Antonio, but also called Antonello degli Antoni and Anglicized as Anthony of Messina, was an Italian painter from Messina, active during the Italian Early Renaissance.

His work shows strong influences from Early Netherlandish painting, although there is no documentary evidence that he ever travelled beyond Italy. Giorgio Vasari credited him with the introduction of oil painting into Italy, although this is now regarded as wrong. Unusually for a southern Italian artist of the Renaissance, his work proved influential on painters in northern Italy, especially in Venice.

== Biography ==
=== Early life and training ===
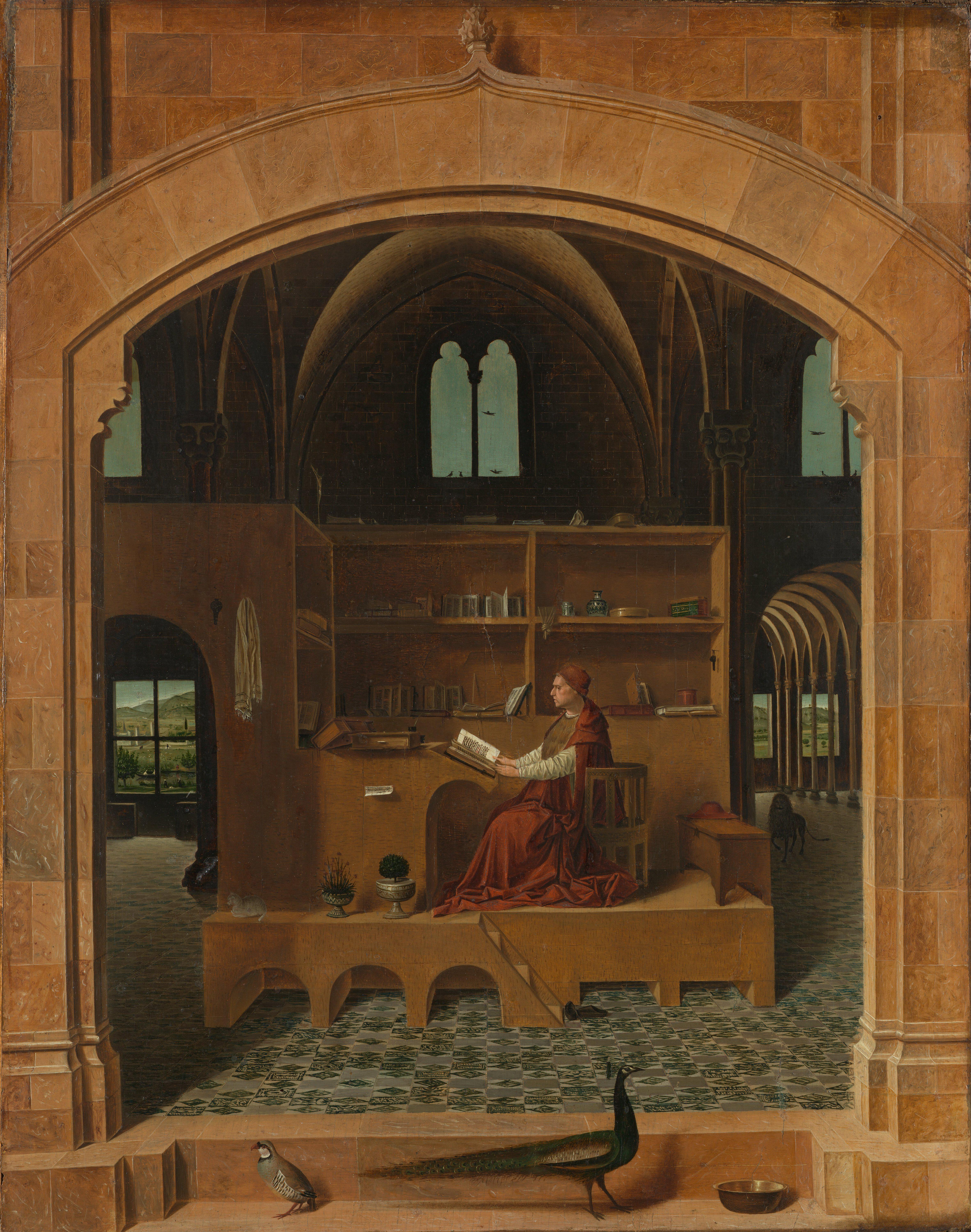
Antonello's St Jerome in His Study, c. 1475

Antonello was born at Messina around 1429–1431, to Garita (Margherita) and Giovanni de Antonio Mazonus, a sculptor who trained him early on. He and his family resided in the Sicofanti district of the city.

Antonello is thought to have apprenticed in Rome before going to Naples, where Netherlandish painting was then fashionable. According to a letter written in 1524 by the Neapolitan humanist Pietro Summonte, in about 1450 Antonello was a pupil of the painter Niccolò Colantonio in Naples. This account of his training is accepted by most art historians.

=== Early career ===
Antonello returned to Messina from Naples during the 1450s. In around 1455, he painted the so-called Sibiu Crucifixion, inspired by Flemish treatments of the subject, which is now in the Muzeul de Artă in Bucharest. A Crucifixion in the Royal Museum of Antwerp dates from the same period. These early works show a marked Flemish influence, which is now understood to be inspired by his master Colantonio and by paintings by Rogier van der Weyden and Jan van Eyck that belonged to Colantonio's patron, Alfonso V of Aragon.

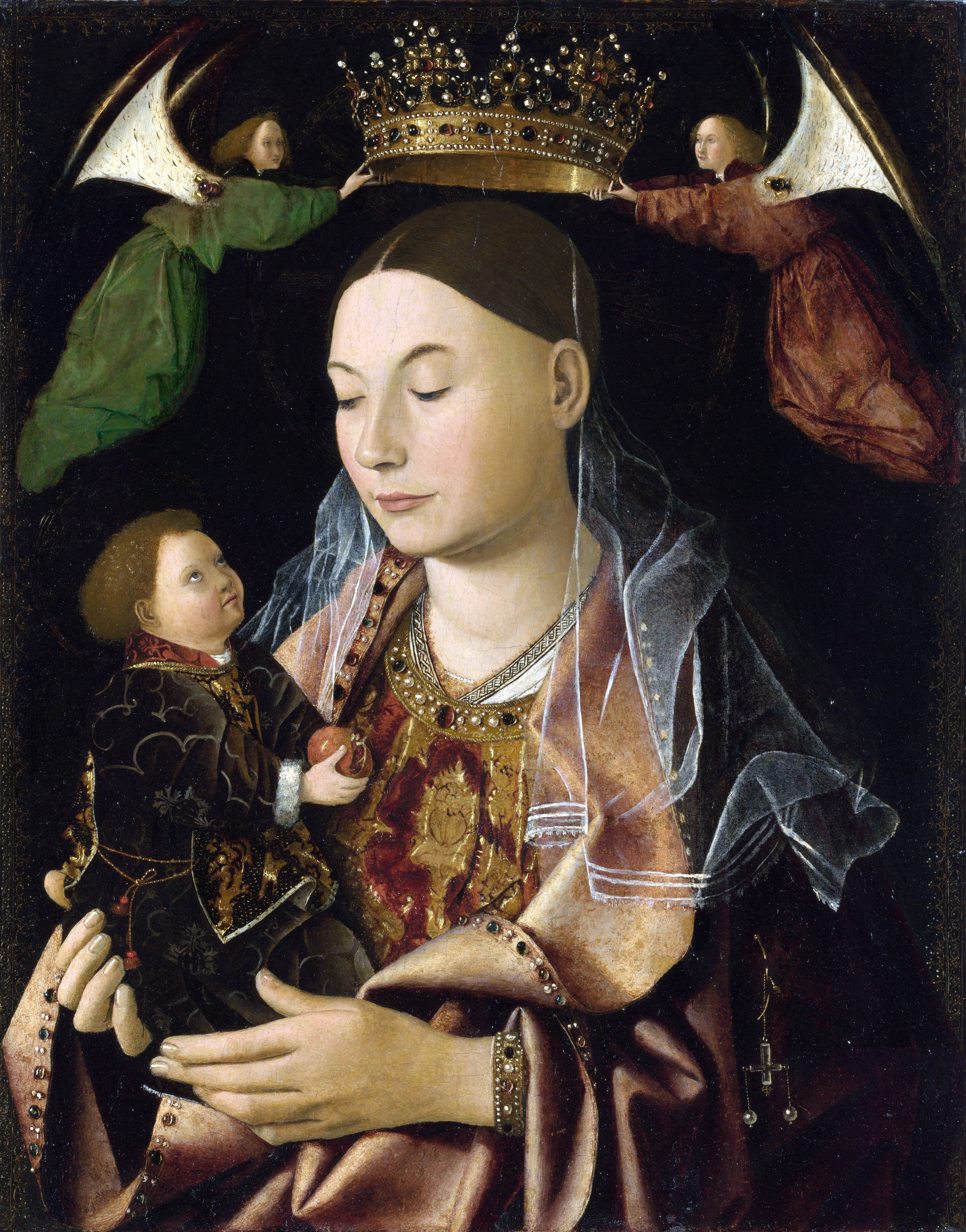
Antonello's Salting Madonna

In his biography of the artist, Giorgio Vasari remarked that Antonello saw an oil painting by Van Eyck (the Lomellini Tryptych) belonging to King Alfonso V of Aragon at Naples and consequently introduced oil painting to Italy. Recent evidence indicates that an "Antonello di Sicilia" (di Sicilia meaning 'from Sicily') was in contact with Van Eyck's most accomplished follower, Petrus Christus, in Milan in early 1456. It appears likely that this was, in fact, Antonello da Messina, as this would explain why he was one of the first Italians to master Eyckian oil painting, and why Petrus Christus was the first Netherlandish painter to learn Italian linear perspective. Antonello's paintings after that date show an observation of almost microscopic detail and of minute gradations of light on reflecting or light-absorbent objects that is very close to the style of the Netherlandish masters, suggesting that Antonello was personally instructed by Christus. Also, the calmer expressions on human faces and calmness in the overall composition of Antonello's works appear to be owing to a Netherlandish influence. He is believed to have shared Van Eyck's techniques with Gentile and Giovanni Bellini.

Between the years of 1456 and 1457, Antonello proved himself to be a master painter in Messina. He also shared his home with Paolo di Ciacio, a student from Calabria. The artist's earliest documented commission, in 1457, was for a banner for the Confraternità di San Michele dei Gerbini in Reggio Calabria, where he set up a workshop for the production of such banners and devotional images. At this date, he was already married, and his son Jacobello had been born.

In 1460, his father is mentioned as leasing a brigantine to bring back Antonello and his family from Amantea in Calabria. In that year, Antonello painted the so-called Salting Madonna, in which standard iconography and Flemish style are combined with a greater attention to the volumetric proportions of the figures, probably indicating a knowledge of works by Piero della Francesca. Also from around 1460 are two small panels depicting Abraham Served by the Angels and St. Jerome Penitent now in the Museo Nazionale della Magna Grecia in Reggio Calabria. In 1461, Antonello's younger brother Giordano entered his workshop, signing a three-year contract. In that year, Antonello painted a Madonna with Child, now lost, for the Messinese nobleman Giovanni Mirulla.

Historians believe that Antonello painted his first portraits in the late 1460s. They follow a Netherlandish model, the subject being shown bust-length, against a dark background, full face or in three-quarter view, while most previous Italian painters had adopted the medal-style profile pose for individual portraits. John Pope-Hennessy described Antonello as "the first Italian painter for whom the individual portrait was an art form in its own right".

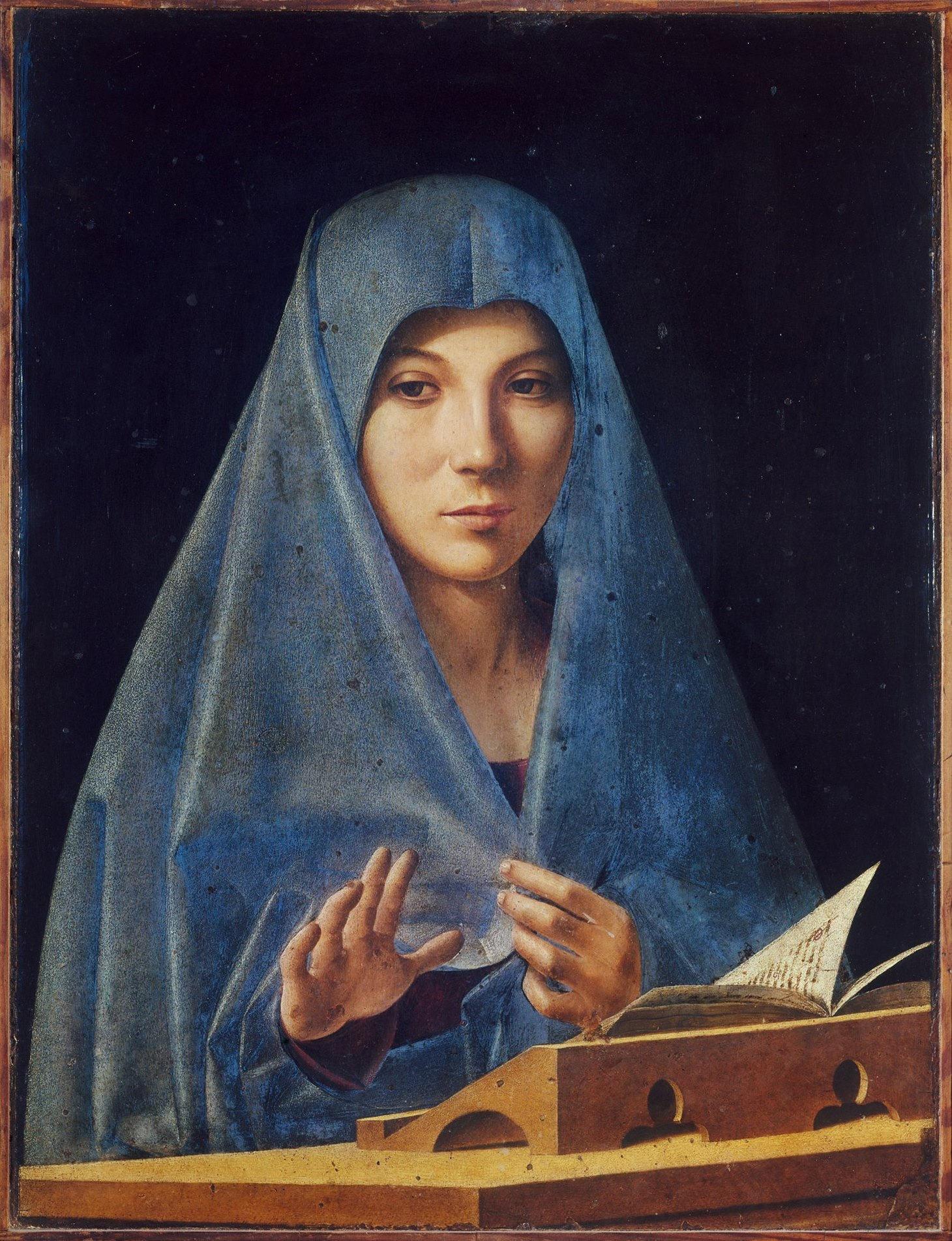
The Virgin Annunciate in the Palazzo Abatellis in Palermo

Although Antonello is mentioned in many documents between 1460 and 1465, establishing his presence in Messina in those years, a gap in the sources between 1465 and 1471 suggests that he may have spent these years on the mainland. In 1474, he painted the Annunciation, now in Syracuse, and the St. Jerome in His Study also dates from around this time.

=== Venice ===
Antonello went to Venice in 1475 and remained there until the fall of 1476. His works of this period begin to show a greater attention to the human figure, regarding both anatomy and expressivity, indicating the influence of Piero della Francesca and Giovanni Bellini. His most famous pictures from this period include the Condottiero (Louvre), the San Cassiano Altarpiece and the St. Sebastian. The San Cassiano Altarpiece was especially influential on Venetian painters, as it was one of the first of the large compositions in the sacra conversazione format, which was perfected by Giovanni Bellini (Antonello's surviving work in Vienna is only a fragment of a much larger original). It is also likely that Antonello passed on both the techniques of using oil paints and the principles of calmness on subjects' faces and in the composition of paintings to Giovanni Bellini and other Venetian painters during that visit. While in Venice, he was offered, but did not accept, the opportunity to become the court portrait painter to the Duke of Milan.

=== Return to Messina and death ===
Antonello had returned to Sicily by September 1476. Works from near the end of his life include the famous Virgin Annunciate, now in the Palazzo Abatellis in Palermo, and the San Gregorio Polyptych.

He died at Messina in 1479. His testament dates from February of that year, and he is documented as no longer alive two months later. Some of his last works remained unfinished, but were completed by his son Jacobello.

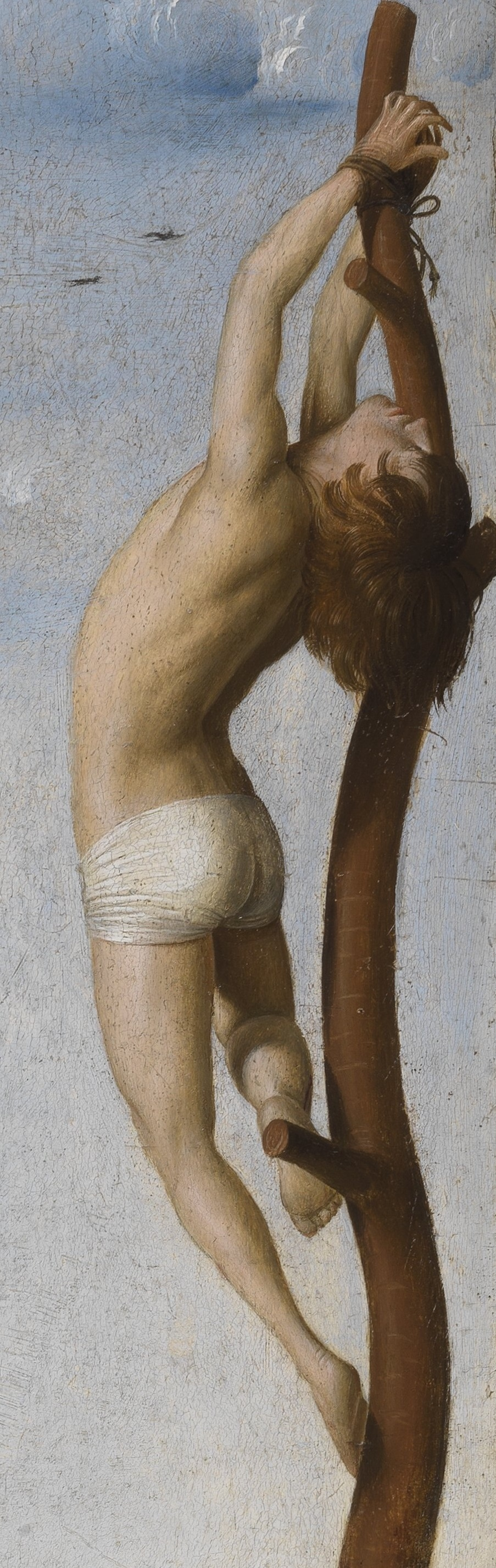
Crucifixion, Antwerp, detail

== Style and legacy ==
Antonello's style is remarkable for its union of Italian simplicity with Flemish concern for detail. He exercised an enormous influence on Italian painting, not only by the introduction of the Flemish invention, but also by the transmission of Flemish tendencies. However, no school of painting formed after his death, with the exception of the Sicilian Marco Costanzo.

== Selected works ==
- Sibiu Crucifixion (1455) - Brukenthal National Museum, Sibiu
- Abraham Served by the Angels - Museo della Magna Grecia, Reggio Calabria
- Portrait of a Man (1460s) - Oil on wood, Civic Museums, Pavia
- Ecce Homo (c. 1470) - Tempera and oil on panel, 42.5 x 30.5 cm, Metropolitan Museum of Art, New York City
- Ecce Homo (1470) - Tempera and oil on panel, 40 x 33 cm, Galleria Nazionale di Palazzo Spinola, Genoa
- St. Jerome Penitent - Various techniques on wood, 40.2 x 30.2 cm, Museo della Magna Grecia, Reggio Calabria
- San Gregorio Polyptych (1473) - Tempera on panel, 194 x 202 cm, Regional Museum, Messina
- Ecce Homo (c. 1473) - Tempera on panel, 19.5 x 14.3 cm, Private collection, New York City
- Portrait of a Man (1474) - Oil on wood, Staatliche Museen, Berlin
- Madonna with Child (Salting Madonna) - Oil on wood, 43.2 x 34.3 cm, National Gallery, London
- Portrait of a Man (1474) - Oil on wood, 32 x 26 cm, Staatliche Museen, Berlin
- Annunciation (1474) - Oil on panel, 180 x 180 cm, Bellomo Palace Regional Gallery, Syracuse
- St. Jerome in His Study (c. 1474) - Oil on wood, 46 x 36,5 cm, National Gallery, London
- Ecce Homo (1475) - Oil on panel, 48.5 x 38 cm, Collegio Alberoni, Piacenza
- Portrait of a Man (Il Condottiere) (1475) - Oil on wood, 35 x 38 cm, Musée du Louvre, Paris
- Crucifixion (1455) - Oil on panel 52.5 x 42.5 cm, Koninklijk Museum voor Schone Kunsten, Antwerp
- Crucifixion (1475) - Wood, 42 x 25,5 cm, National Gallery, London
- Portrait of a Man (c. 1475) - Oil on wood, Galleria Borghese, Rome
- Portrait of a Man (c. 1475) - Oil on panel, 36 x 25 cm, National Gallery, London
- Portrait of a Man (1475–1476) - Oil on panel, 28 x 21 cm, Museo Thyssen-Bornemisza, Madrid
- San Cassiano Altarpiece (1475–76) - Oil on panel, Kunsthistorisches Museum, Vienna
- The Dead Christ Supported by an Angel (1475–78) - Panel, 74 x 51 cm, Museo del Prado, Madrid
- Christ at the Column (c. 1475–1479) - Oil on wood, 25,8 x 21 cm, Musée du Louvre, Paris
- Virgin of the Annunciation -Oil on panel, Alte Pinakothek, Munich
- Portrait of a Man (1476) - Oil on panel, Museo Civico d'Arte Antica, Turin
- Virgin of the Annunciation (c. 1476) - Oil on wood, 45 x 34,5 cm, Museo Nazionale, Palermo
- St. Sebastian (1477–1479) - Oil on canvas transferred from panel, 171 × 85 cm, Gemäldegalerie Alte Meister, Dresden
- Portrait of a Young Man (c. 1478) - Panel, 20.4 x 14.5 cm, Staatliche Museen, Berlin
- Portrait of an unknown man - Oil on panel, Museo Mandralisca, Cefalù
- Madonna and Child - Oil and tempera on panel transferred from panel, National Gallery of Art, Washington, D.C.
