= The Three Ages of Man =

The Three Ages of Man may refer to:

- The Three Ages of Man (Giorgione)
- The Three Ages of Man (Titian)

== See also ==
- The Three Ages of Man and Death
