= Three Ages (disambiguation) =

Three Ages may refer to:

- Three Ages, a black-and-white American comedy film
- The Three Ages of Man and Death, a 16th-century painting by Hans Baldung
- Three-age system, a series of ages defined by the use of stone, bronze and iron
- The three stages of human progress, a progression proposed by Lewis H. Morgan in Ancient Society
- Three Ages of Buddhism, three time divisions of the religion
- The Three Ages of the Interior Life, a book by Reginald Garrigou-Lagrange
- The Three Ages before and during the events of Lord of the Rings, in Tolkien's legendarium.
