= Eve, the Serpent and Death =

Painting by Hans Baldung

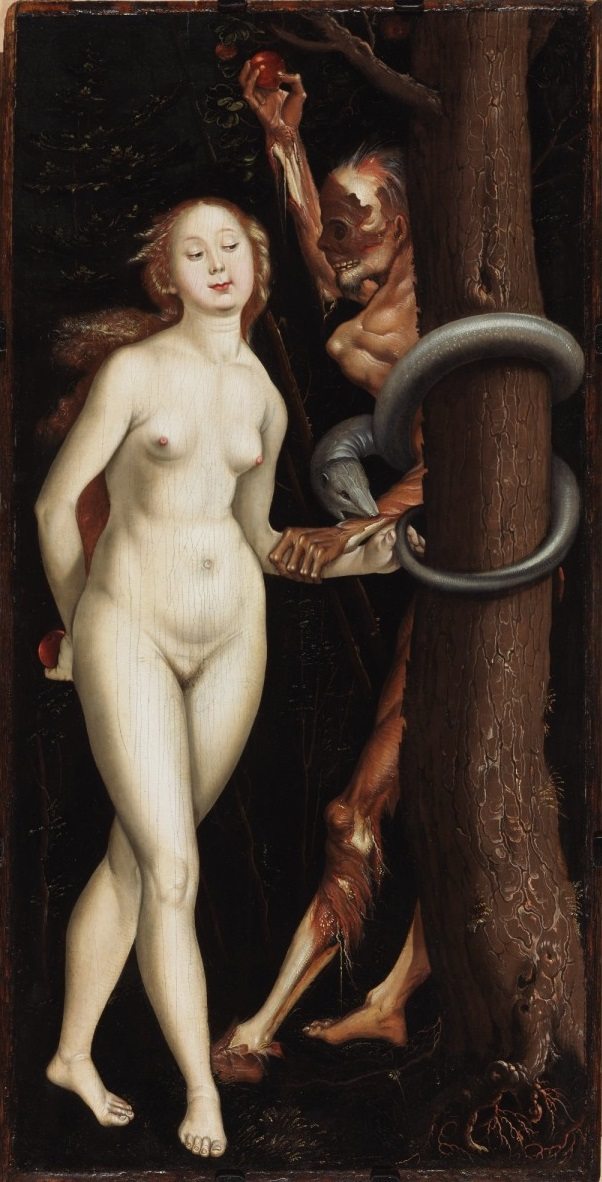
- Artist: Hans Baldung
- Year: early 1510s–1530
- Medium: Oil on panel
- Dimensions: 63 cm × 32.5 cm (25 in × 12.8 in)
- Location: National Gallery of Canada; Ottawa

Eve, the Serpent and Death (or Eve, the Serpent, and Adam as Death) is a painting by the German Renaissance artist Hans Baldung, housed in the National Gallery of Canada, Ottawa. The date of the painting is debated, with proposals ranging from the early 1510s to between 1525 and 1530. Its four main elements are the biblical Eve, a male figure personifying Death and generally likened to Adam, a serpent, and a tree trunk.

== History ==
The painting was in the collection of British politician William Angerstein before being auctioned in 1875 at Christie's as a work of Lucas Cranach the Elder, though in fact the work offers a great contrast to Cranach's many Adam and Eves, from which only the pose of Eve is borrowed. Almost a century later, it was determined to be a Baldung work by the Scottish branch of Sotheby's, where it was auctioned in 1969.

The buyer sold it to the National Gallery of Canada of Ottawa in 1972, where it has since been cleaned and restored.

== Description ==
Baldung treated the Fall in a number of woodcuts and paintings, which he signifies by the apple and the bite of the serpent; his iconography is often as original and arresting as in this work. In this panel, the bodies are grand in scale and fill essentially the entire space, and pale foreground colors are used against a dark background. The main elements are intertwined; the serpent is coiled around the tree trunk and also around Death, who he holds to the tree. Death's right arm extends upward to grasp the apple. The serpent, which has red eyes and a weasel-like head, closes its jaws around the wrist of Death's left arm, which is at the same time grasping the left arm of Eve. Eve's left hand holds part of the serpent's tail, while her right hand holds an apple behind her back. Among Baldung's treatments of the Fall, the new element in Eve, the Serpent and Death is the active role of the snake; Adam's decrepit condition, halfway between nude and skeleton, suggests the work of poison, as if from the serpent, and the snake's grip on Adam recalls the biting of the apple in the Fall. The apple that each of the figures holds is the symbolic origin of the present scene, in which "everything is dependent on and implicated in everything else".

In the background is a dense forest while two more tree trunks, slim, angled, and parallel, occupy the middle ground. A marguerite, probably an oxeye daisy, sits at the roots of the main tree trunk, in front of Death's right heel.

== Sources ==
- Hieatt, A. Kent (June 1983). "Hans Baldung Grien's Ottawa Eve and Its Context". The Art Bulletin. 65 (2). College Art Association: 290–304. doi:10.2307/3050323. JSTOR 3050323.
- Koerner, Joseph Leo (1993). The Moment of Self-portraiture in German Renaissance Art. University of Chicago Press. ISBN 0-226-44999-8.
