= The Trinity and Mystic Pietà =

Painting by Hans Baldung

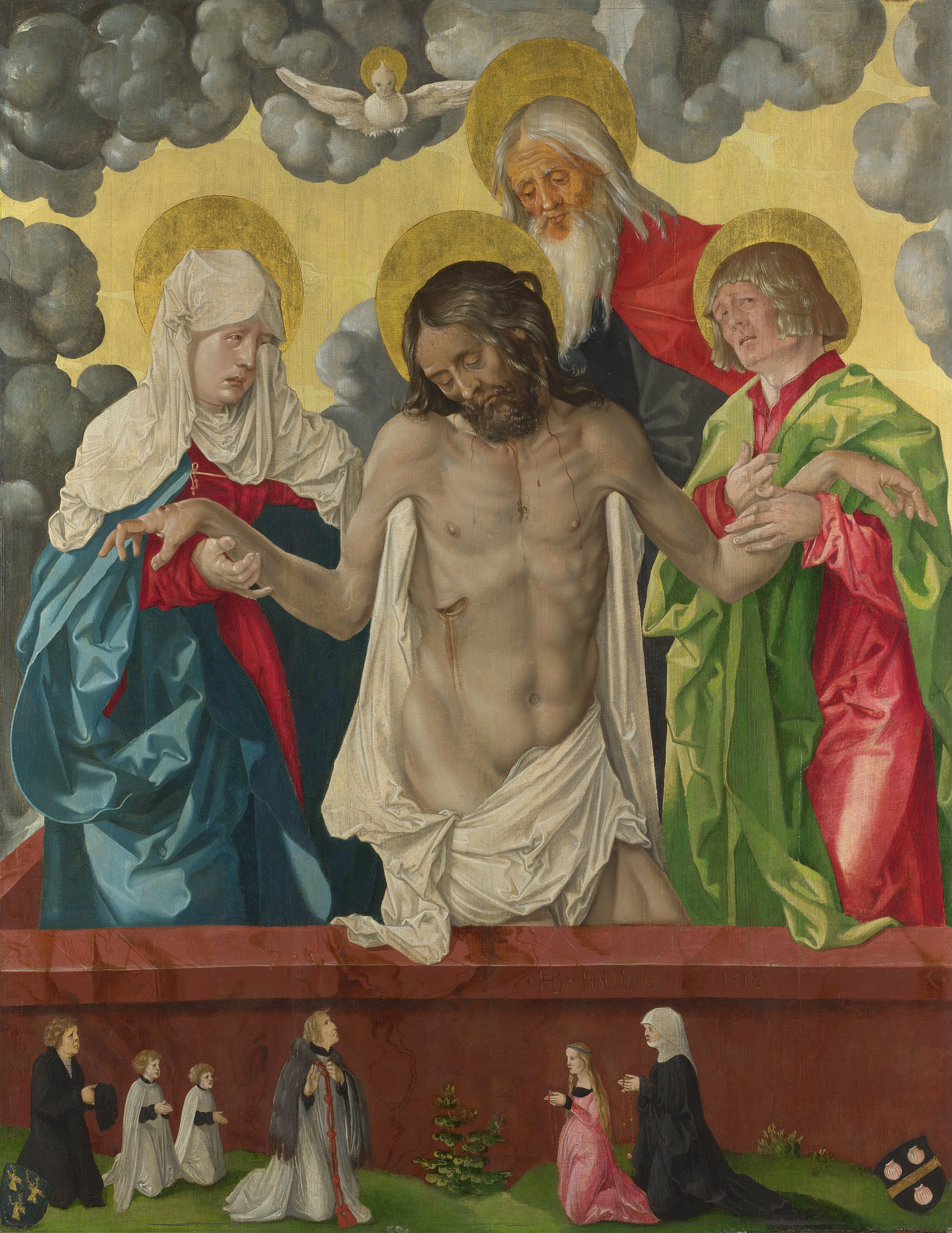
- Artist: Hans Baldung
- Year: 1512
- Medium: Oil on oak
- Dimensions: 112.3 cm × 89.1 cm (44.2 in × 35.1 in)
- Location: National Gallery, London

The Trinity and Mystic Pietà is an oil-on-oak painting produced in 1512 by the German artist Hans Baldung.

== Painting ==
The painting shows God the Father supporting his son, Jesus, with the Holy Spirit above them, represented by a dove; the Trinity is joined by the weeping figures of the Virgin Mary and St. John. The inclusion of God supporting his crucified son within the picture was popular during the late fourteenth and early fifteenth centuries, but is otherwise rare in art history. Beneath the holy figures are a series of smaller individuals, who are assumed by art historians to be the family who commissioned the painting; this is likely to be the Bettschold and Rothschild families, given the coats of arms present in the lower corners. The donors were often depicted during the Middle Ages as much smaller than the holy figures, in order to emphasise the difference between them.

The painting was acquired in 1894 by the National Gallery, London. The gallery considers that "Baldung's painting invites our imaginative participation by stressing the human emotions of the mourners, and presenting even God the Father simply as a grieving parent."

== Sources ==
- Dunkerton, Jill; Foister, Susan; Penny, Nicholas (2002). Dürer to Veronese: Sixteenth-century Painting in the National Gallery. London: National Gallery Publications. ISBN 978-0-300-09533-3.
- Herbert McAvoy, Liz (2008). A Companion to Julian of Norwich. Woodbridge, Suffolk: Boydell & Brewer Ltd. ISBN 978-1-84384-172-2.
