= The Ages and Death =

Painting by Hans Baldung

The Ages (of Woman) and Death
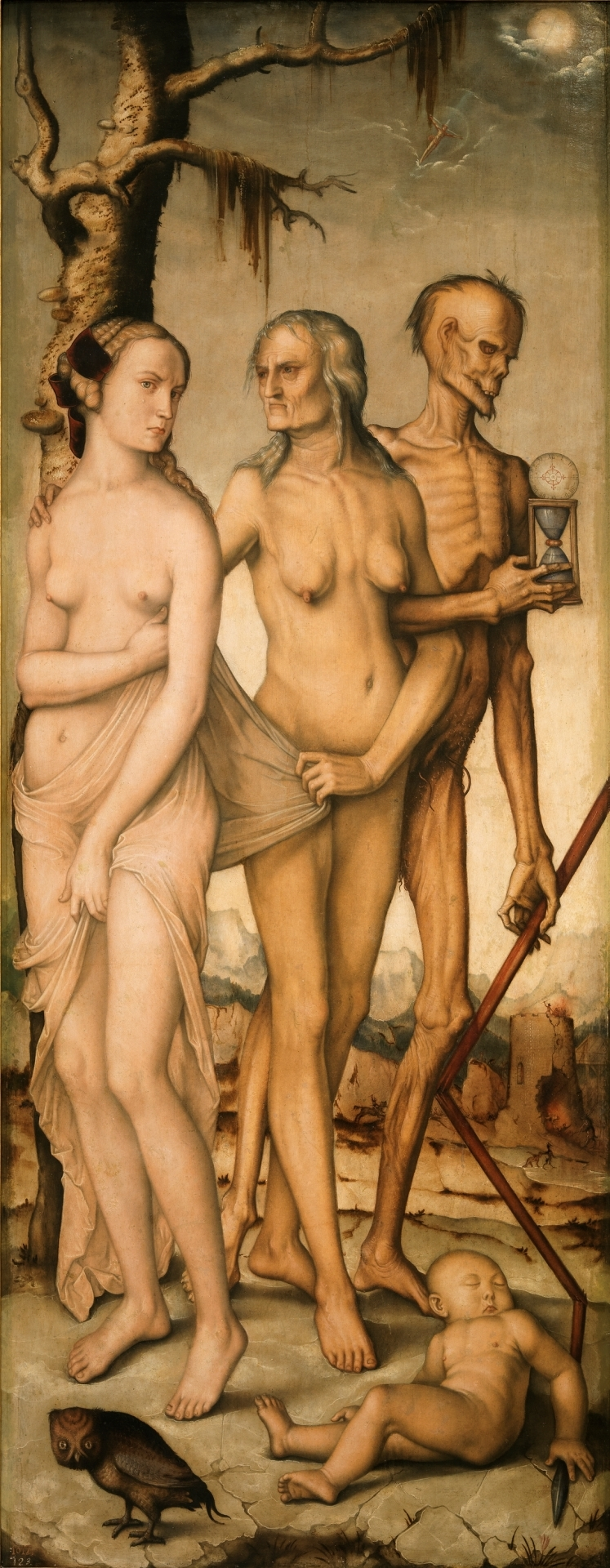
- Artist: Hans Baldung
- Year: 1541–1544
- Medium: Oil on canvas
- Dimensions: 151 cm × 61 cm (59 in × 24 in)
- Location: Museo del Prado; Madrid

The Ages and Death (German: Die drei Lebensalter und der Tod) is an oil-on-canvas painting created between 1541 and 1544 by the German artist Hans Baldung which is in the collection of the Prado Museum, in Madrid. It is also referred to as "The Ages of Woman and Death".

The work is an allegorical painting alluding to the transience of beauty and the fragility of human life. Death with his hourglass and broken lance has already taken the arm of the old woman who is in turn holding on to the younger one. A baby lies sleeping on the ground. In the lower background is a depiction of Hell with above a crucified Christ in a shaft of heavenly light, representing the opposing visions of life after death. The owl at bottom left is a symbol of wisdom warning of the consequences of sin.

It is part of a set of similarly themed paintings by Baldung, such as The Three Graces.

== Related works ==
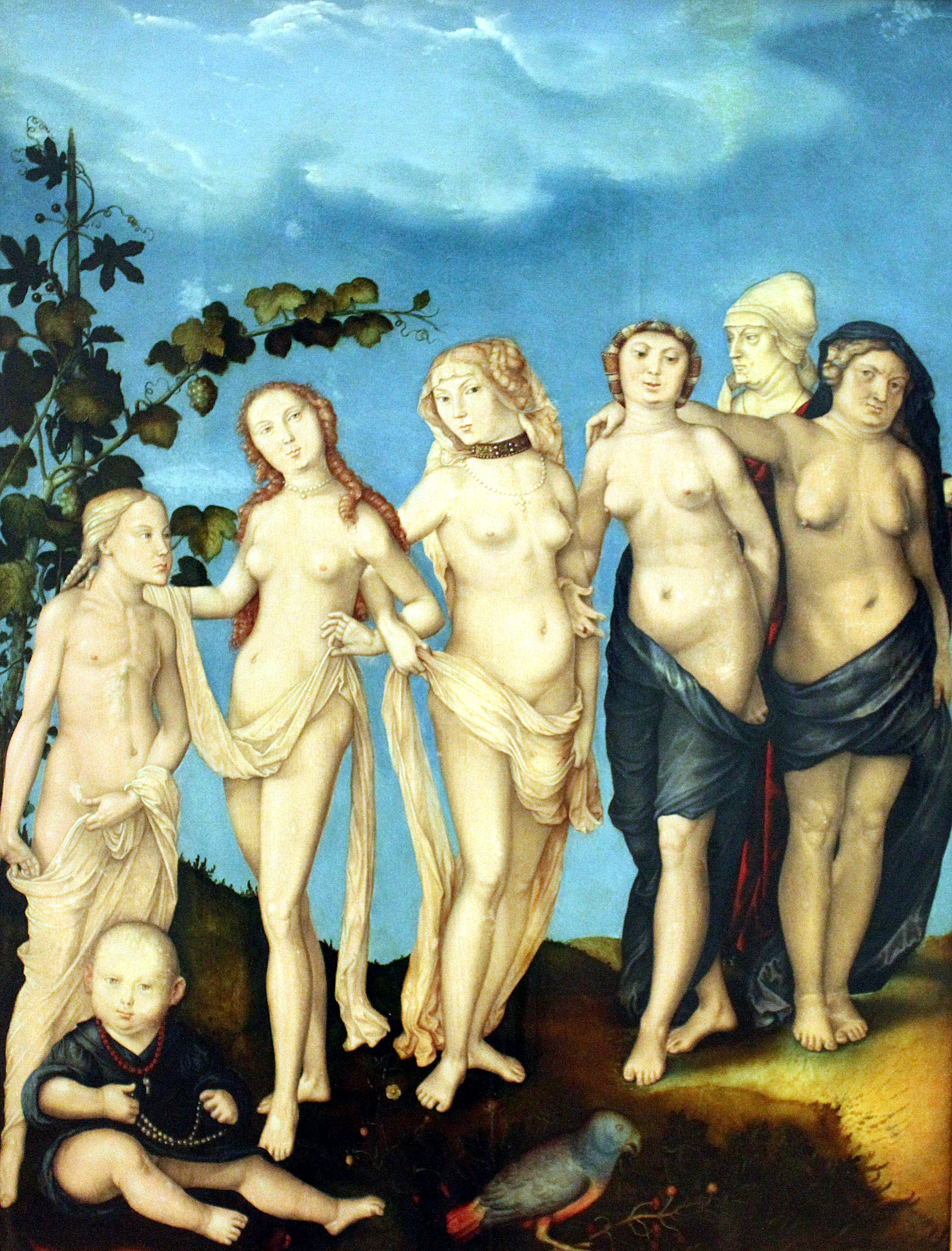
The Seven Ages of Woman, 1544

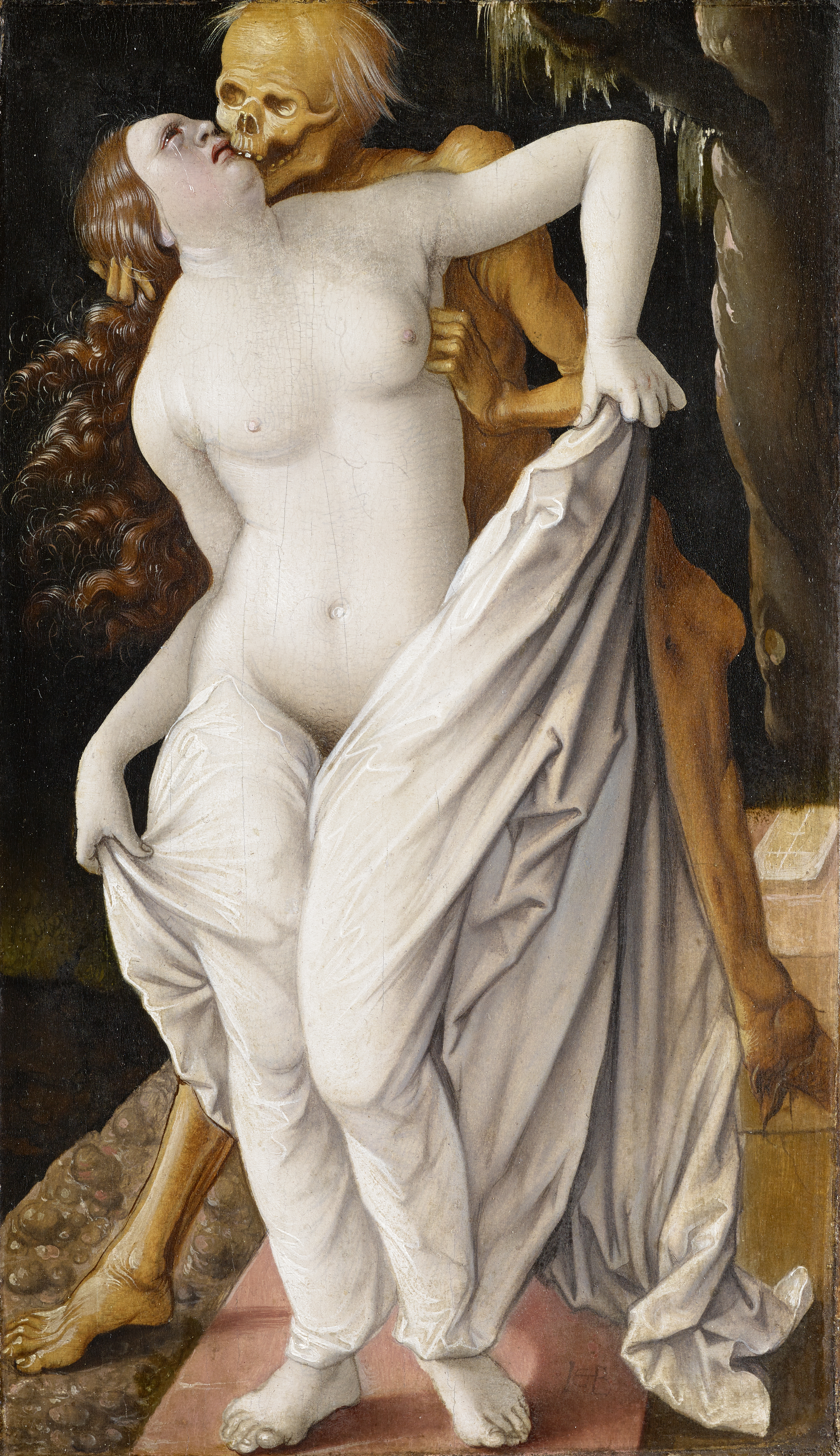
Death and the Woman, 1517

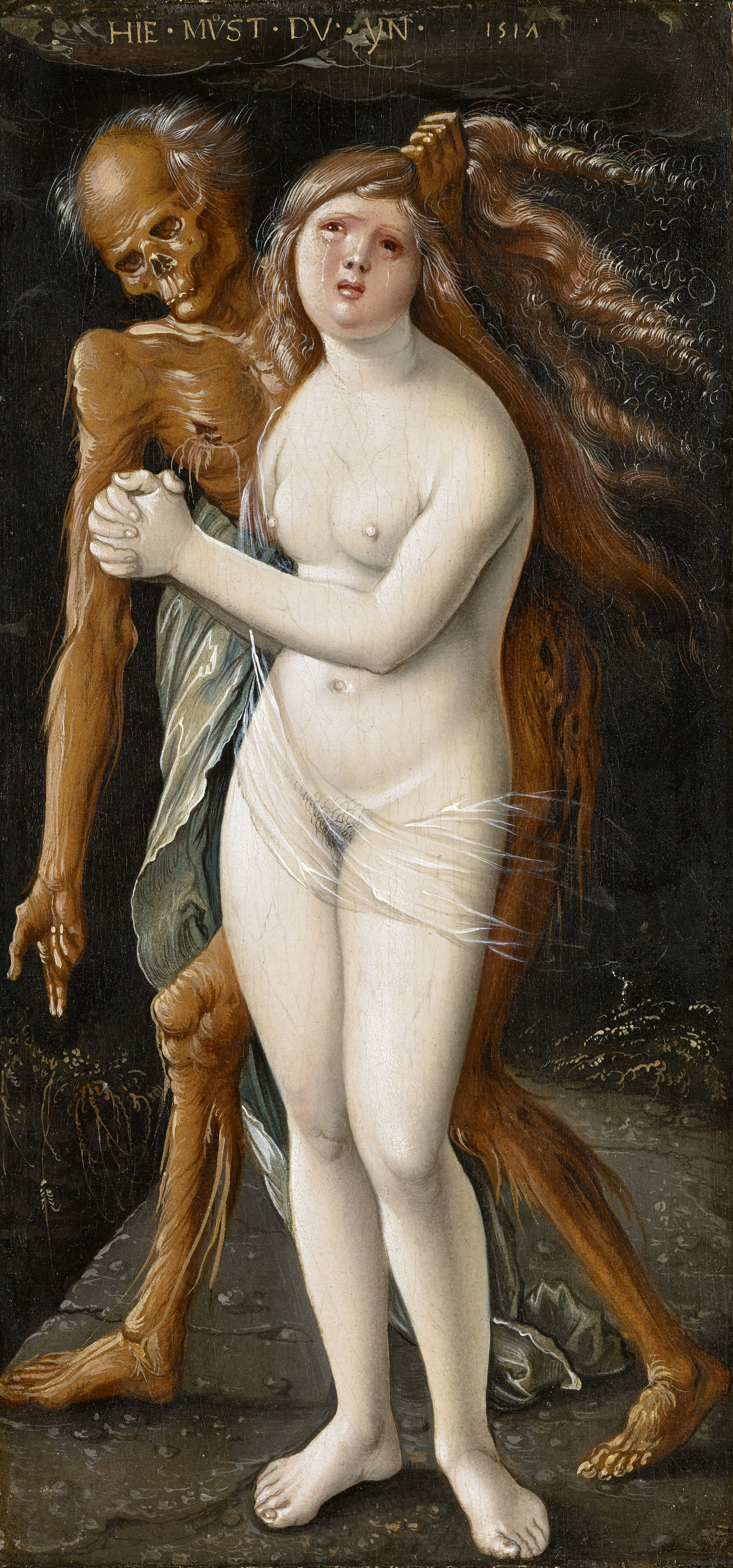
Death and the Maiden, 1517
