= The Seven Ages of Woman =

Painting by Hans Baldung

- Die sieben Lebensalter des Weibes (German)
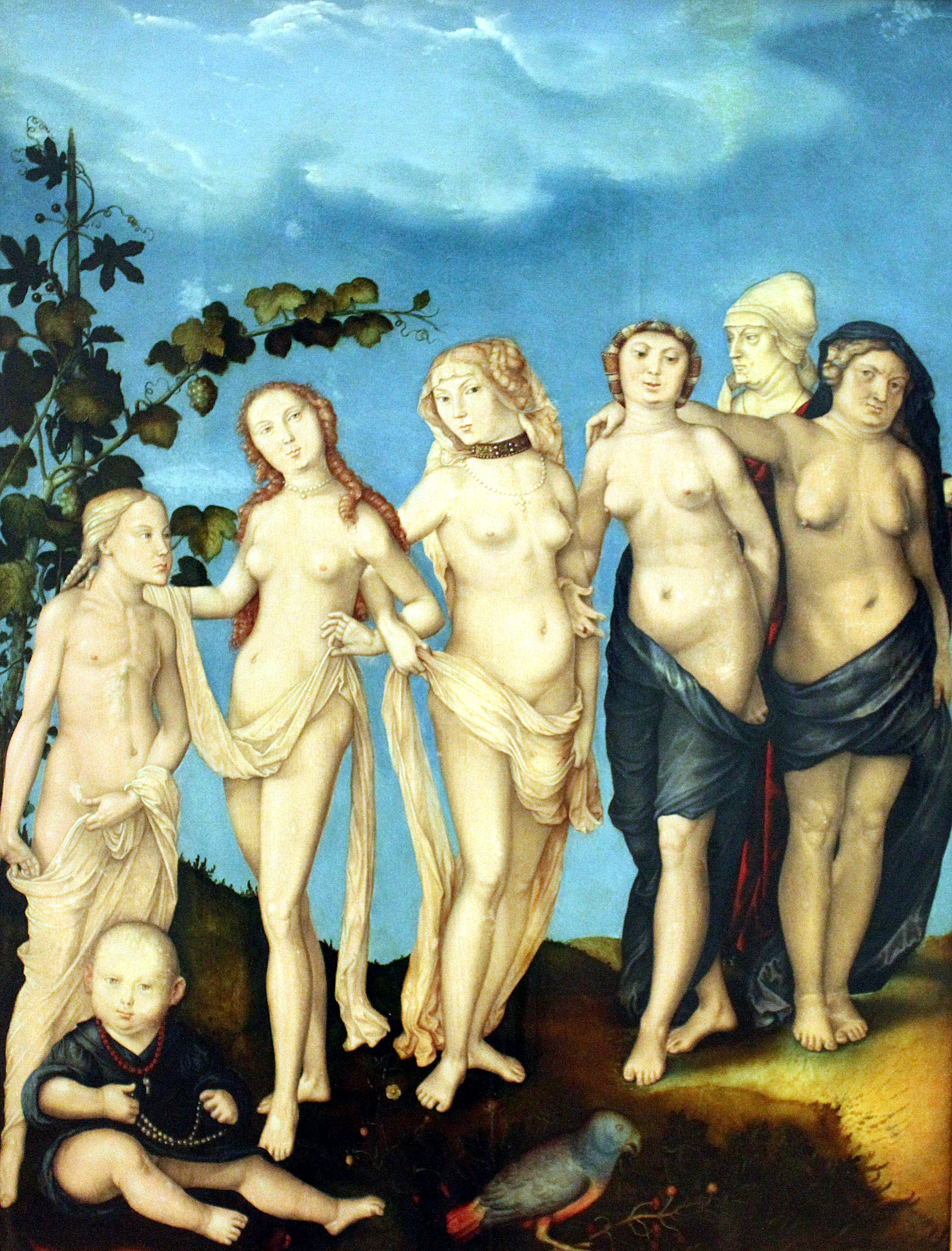
- Artist: Hans Baldung
- Year: 1544
- Medium: oil paint, wood
- Dimensions: 97,4 cm × 74 cm (383 in × 29 in)
- Location: Museum der bildenden Künste; Leipzig

The Seven Ages of Woman is a painting (1544) by the German painter Hans Baldung, called Grien, executed in oil paint on linden wood. It is part of the collection of the Museum der bildenden Künste in Leipzig, Germany.

== Description ==
The picture from the Renaissance shows a small child in the front left, behind it, from left to right, a group of five female figures in stages of life from about 10 to 50 years, barely covered by cleverly looped cloths. Each of the women is distinguished from her neighbor by characteristic features and at the same time is compositionally connected to her in order to show how the various ages of life belong together in one life course. The oldest female figure can be seen in the background on the right. She is pale, is shown in profile and no longer looks into the viewer's presence, but towards the vine and fig tree as symbols of fertility and symbols of the eternal renewal of life and points to the right of the picture.

The low horizon gives the figures monumentality, the blue sky gives the allegory of transience a meditative expression. The thoughtful and life-oriented painting is probably the last major work by Hans Baldung, who died the following year.

Characteristic of Baldung is the proximity of the physical conception of female aging to sexuality, sin and death, which is already apparent in the nakedness of the women and the relentless display of the erotic appeal of youth in stark contrast to the physical deterioration of the female body in old age.

More pictures on the topic Age and Death by Hans Baldung:

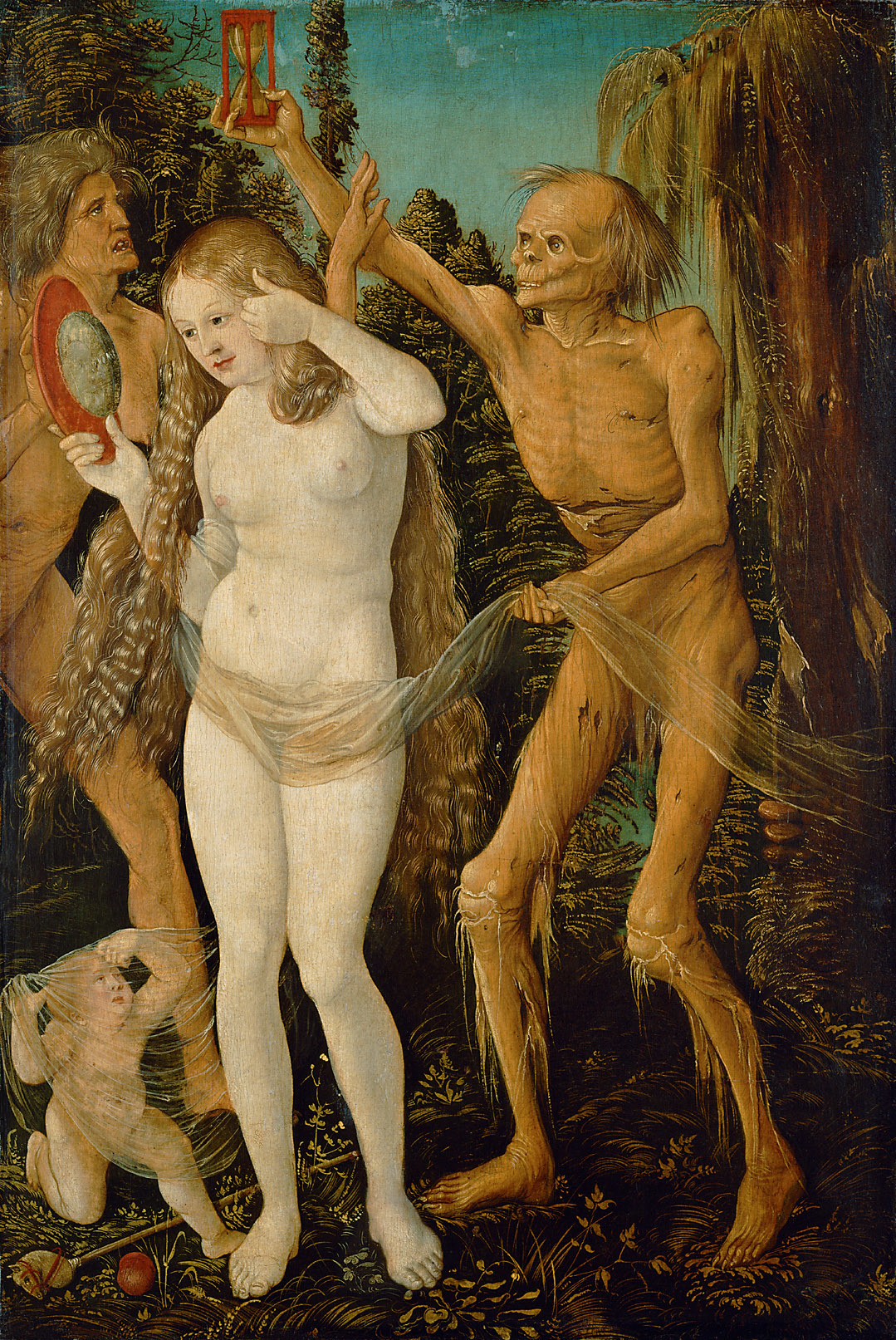
Hans Baldung, The three ages and Death (Die drei Lebensalter und der Tod), Kunsthistorisches Museum Wien

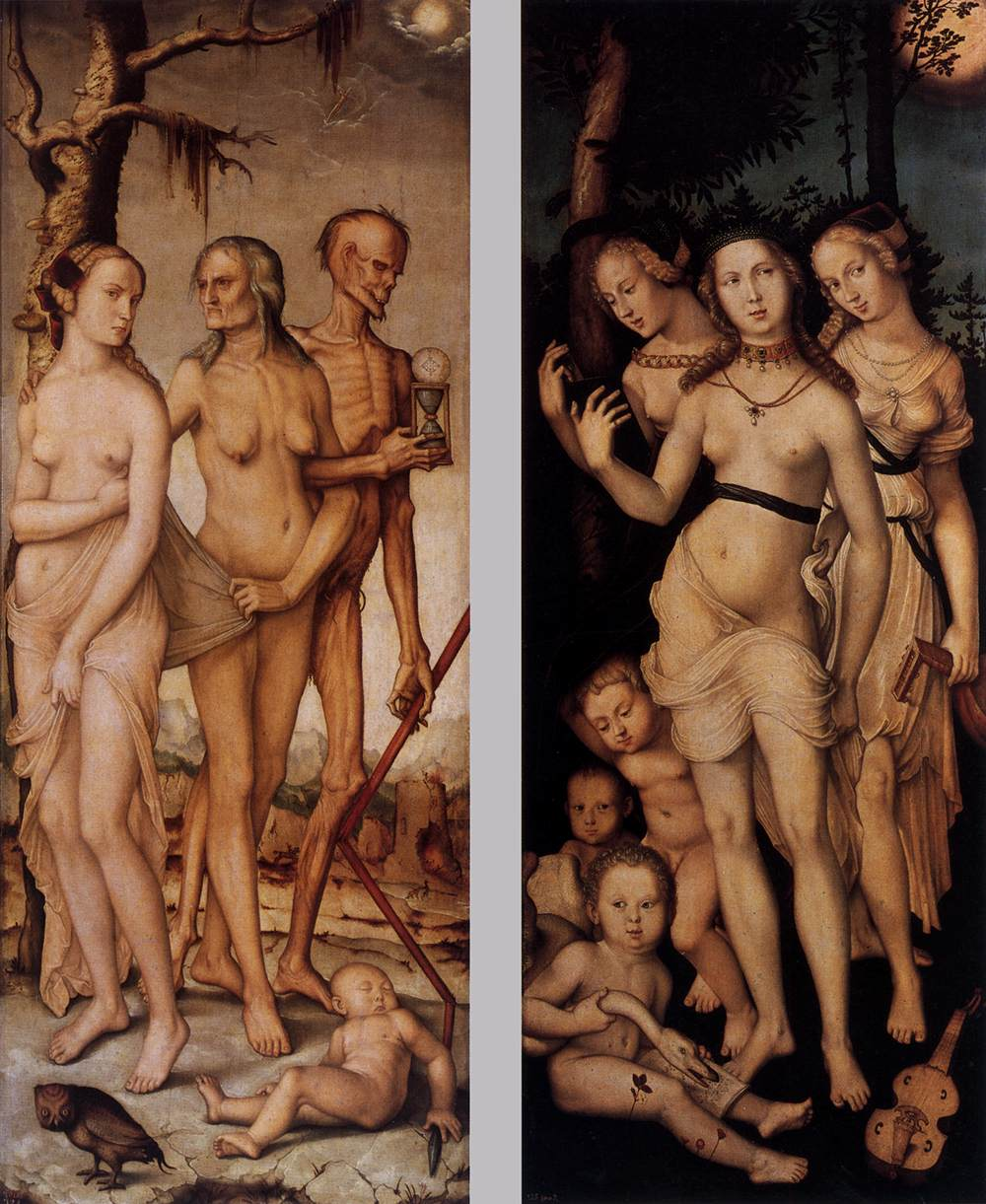
Hans Baldung, Three Ages of Man and Three Graces, 1540–1545, Prado

== Provenance ==
The picture came into the collection of the Museum der bildenden Künste in 1944 from the legacy of the Leipzig banker and art historian Fritz von Harck.
