= Death and the Maiden (Baldung) =

Painting by Hans Baldung

Death and the Maiden (Death and Lust)
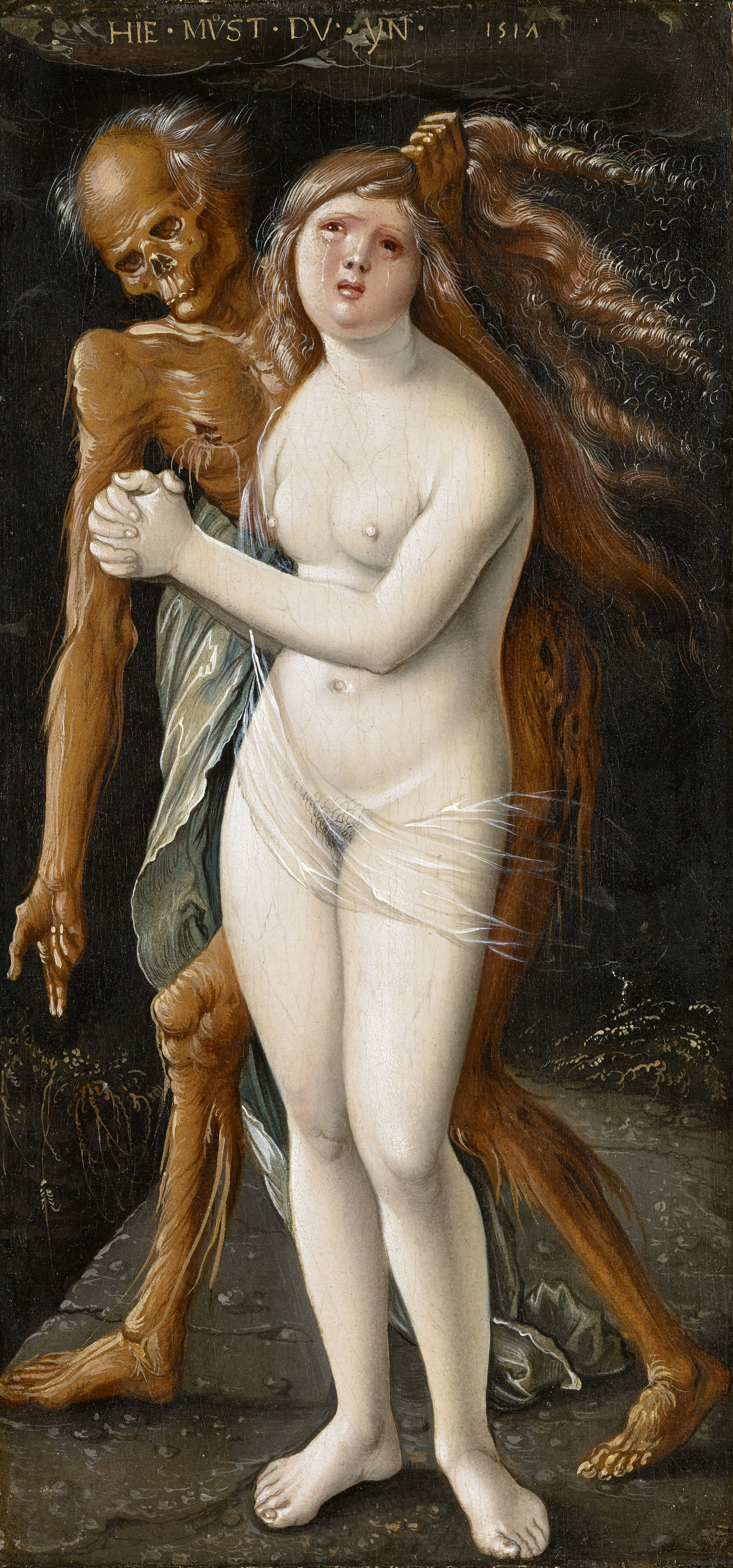
- Artist: Hans Baldung
- Year: 1517
- Medium: tempera on limewood
- Dimensions: 30.3 cm × 14.7 cm (11.9 in × 5.8 in)
- Location: Kunstmuseum Basel, Basel

Death and the Maiden or Death and Lust is a painting executed in 1517 by the German artist Hans Baldung (otherwise known as Hans Baldung Grien) which is in the collection of the Kunstmuseum Basel, Basel, Switzerland.

The work depicts a popular theme that Baldung himself visited several times, that of the early death of a young woman, often with erotic overtones. In this version Death has seized hold of a voluptuous young woman's hair and is pointing down to a tomb in mock benediction. Above his head are written the words "Hie must du yn" or "Here you must go". The distraught victim, fully aware of her fate, wrings her hands together, pleading for her life.

== See also ==
- 100 Great Paintings, 1980 BBC series
- Death and the Maiden (motif)
