= Glasses in a Basket (Stoskopff) =

Painting by Sebastian Stoskopff

- Corbeille de verres (French)
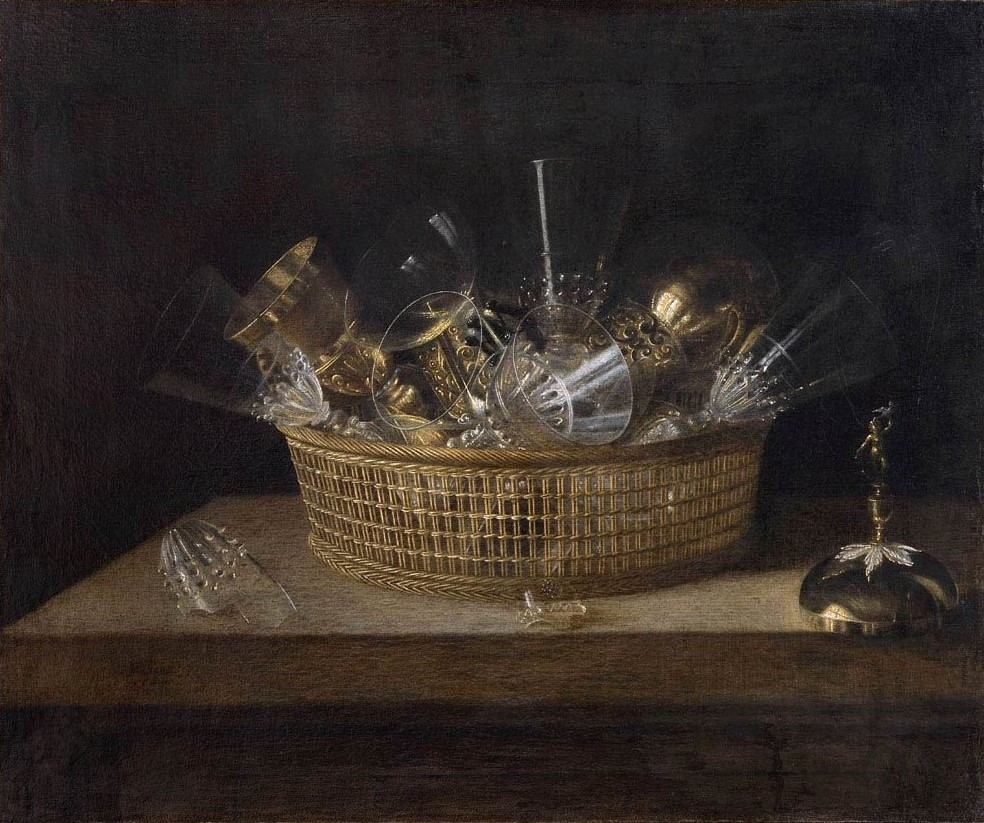
- Artist: Sebastian Stoskopff
- Year: 1644
- Medium: oil painting on canvas
- Movement: Baroque painting Still life
- Subject: glassware in a basket
- Dimensions: 52 cm × 63 cm (20 in × 25 in)
- Location: Musée de l'Œuvre Notre-Dame, Strasbourg
- Accession: between 1931 and 1959

Glasses in a Basket is a 1644 Baroque still life painting by the Alsatian artist Sebastian Stoskopff. It is on display in the Musée de l'Œuvre Notre-Dame of Strasbourg, France. Its inventory number is MBA 1281 ("MBA" stands for Musée des Beaux-Arts).

The painting is representative for the new phase in Stoskopff's work, after he had settled again in his hometown after many years in Paris and demonstrated the extent of his art in his masterpiece from 1641, The Great Vanity. Stoskopff then concentrated on the pictorial rendition of the transparency and the fragility of glass, the reflections of light and contrasts in thickness among and between glasses, etc. These paintings were highly praised and sought after by collectors; Cardinal Richelieu himself owned one, although it is not known if it was MBA 1281.

Still lifes depicting glassware had been pioneered by the painter Georg Flegel, but Stoskopff perfected the genre by concentrating essentially on the transparency and translucency. While MBA 1281 depicts luxury glassware, other paintings (examples below) sometimes depict ordinary drinking glasses. The broken glass alludes to the frailty of existence and serves as a Memento mori.

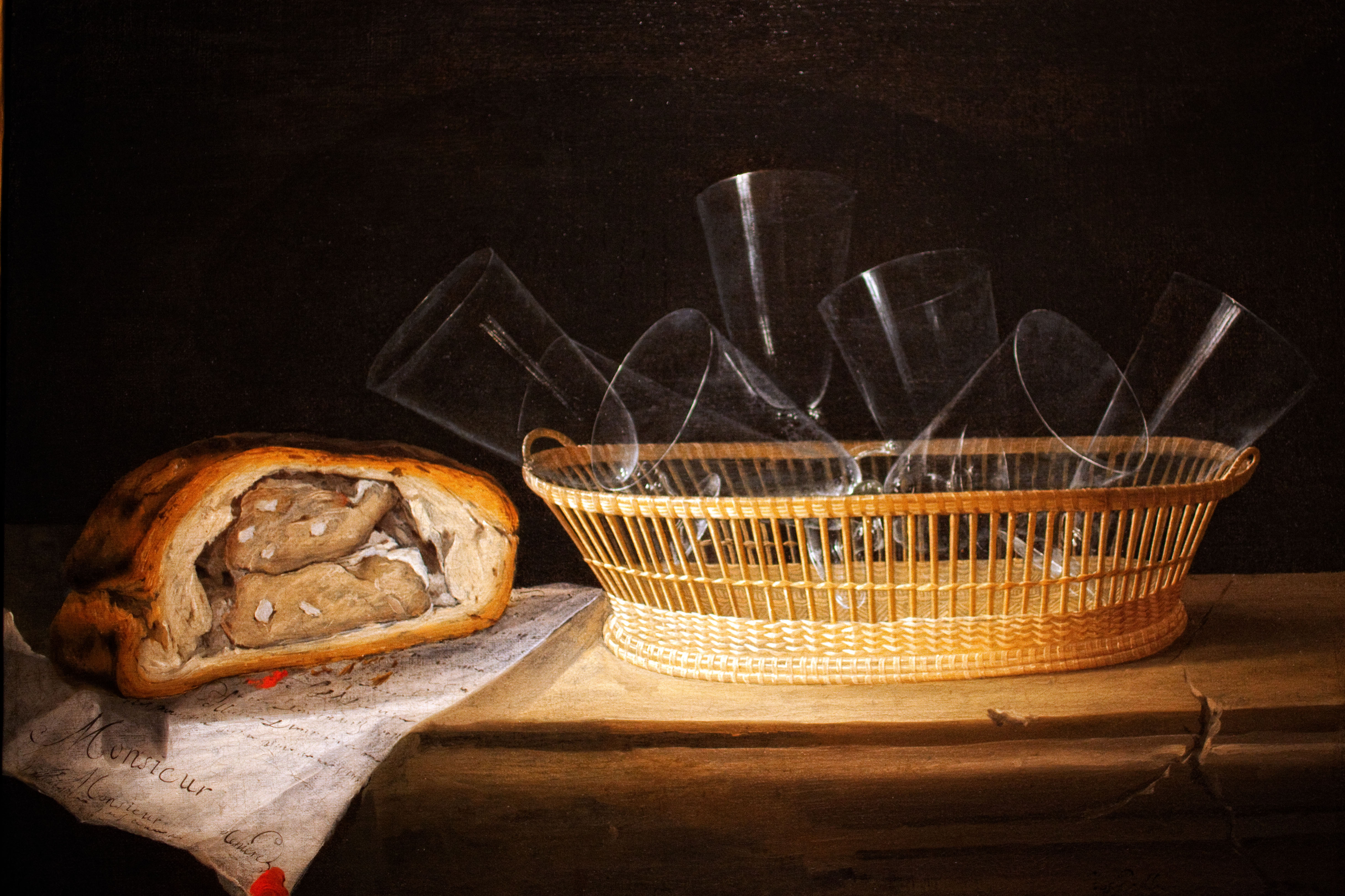
Glasses in a Basket next to a Pâté on a Letter (Musée de l'Œuvre Notre-Dame)

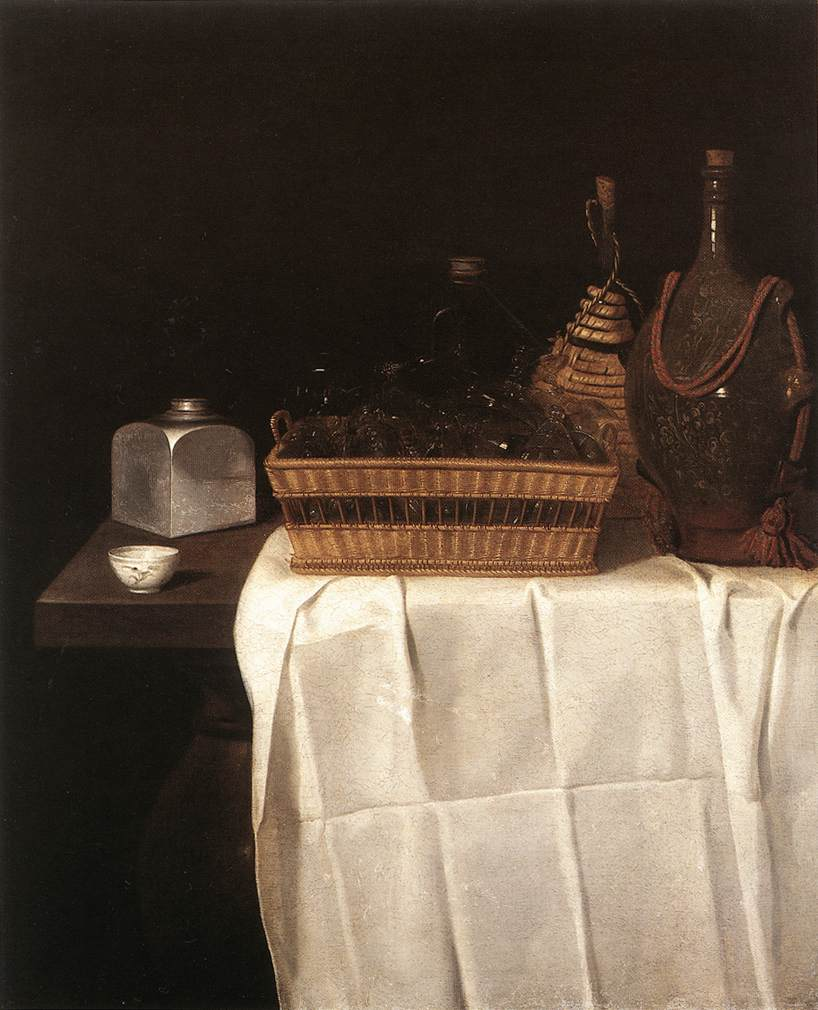
Still Life with Glasses and Bottles (Gemäldegalerie, Berlin)

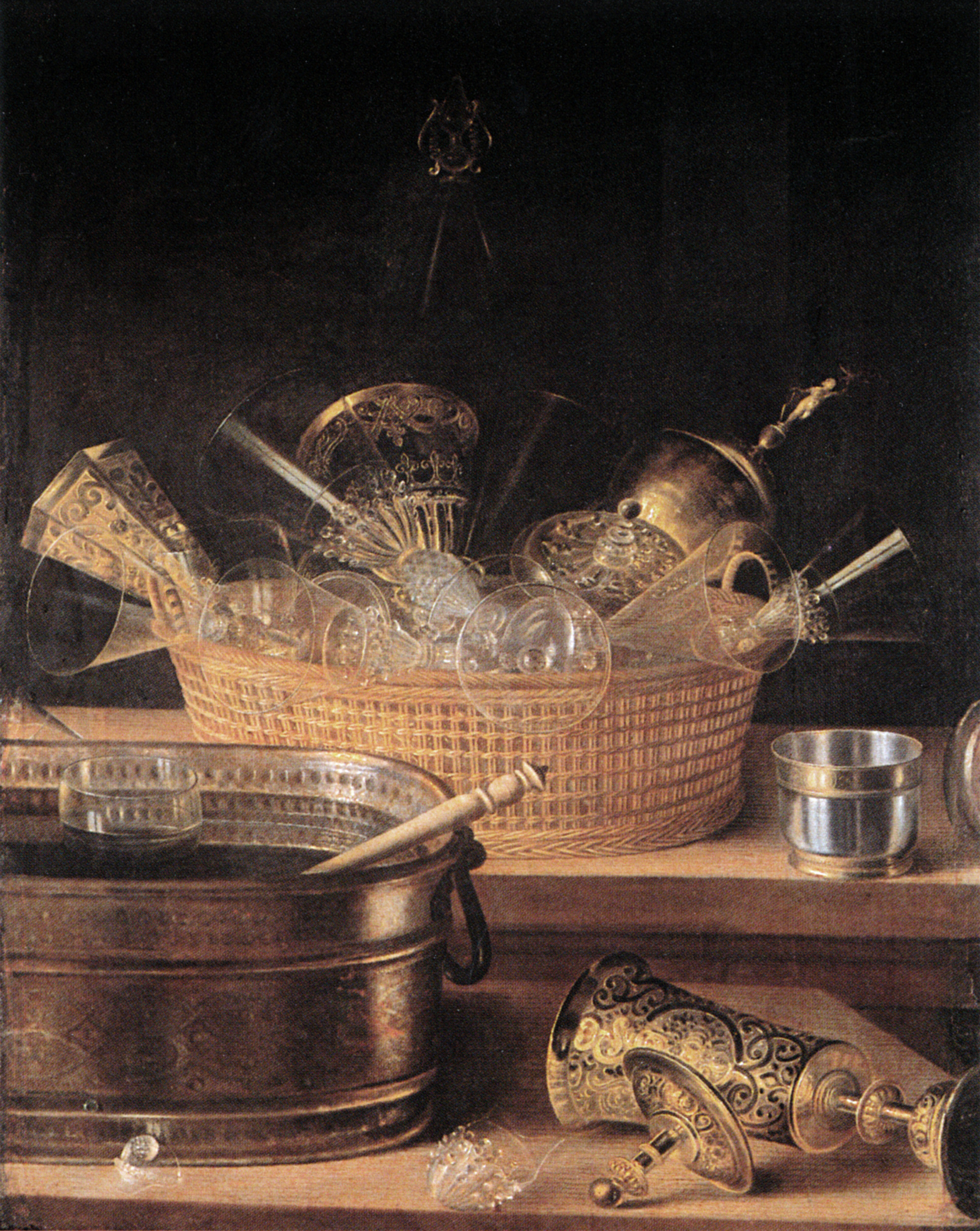
Metal Vessels and Glassware in a Basket (Staatliche Kunsthalle Karlsruhe)
