= The Five Senses (Stoskopff) =

1633 painting by Sebastian Stoskopff

- Summer
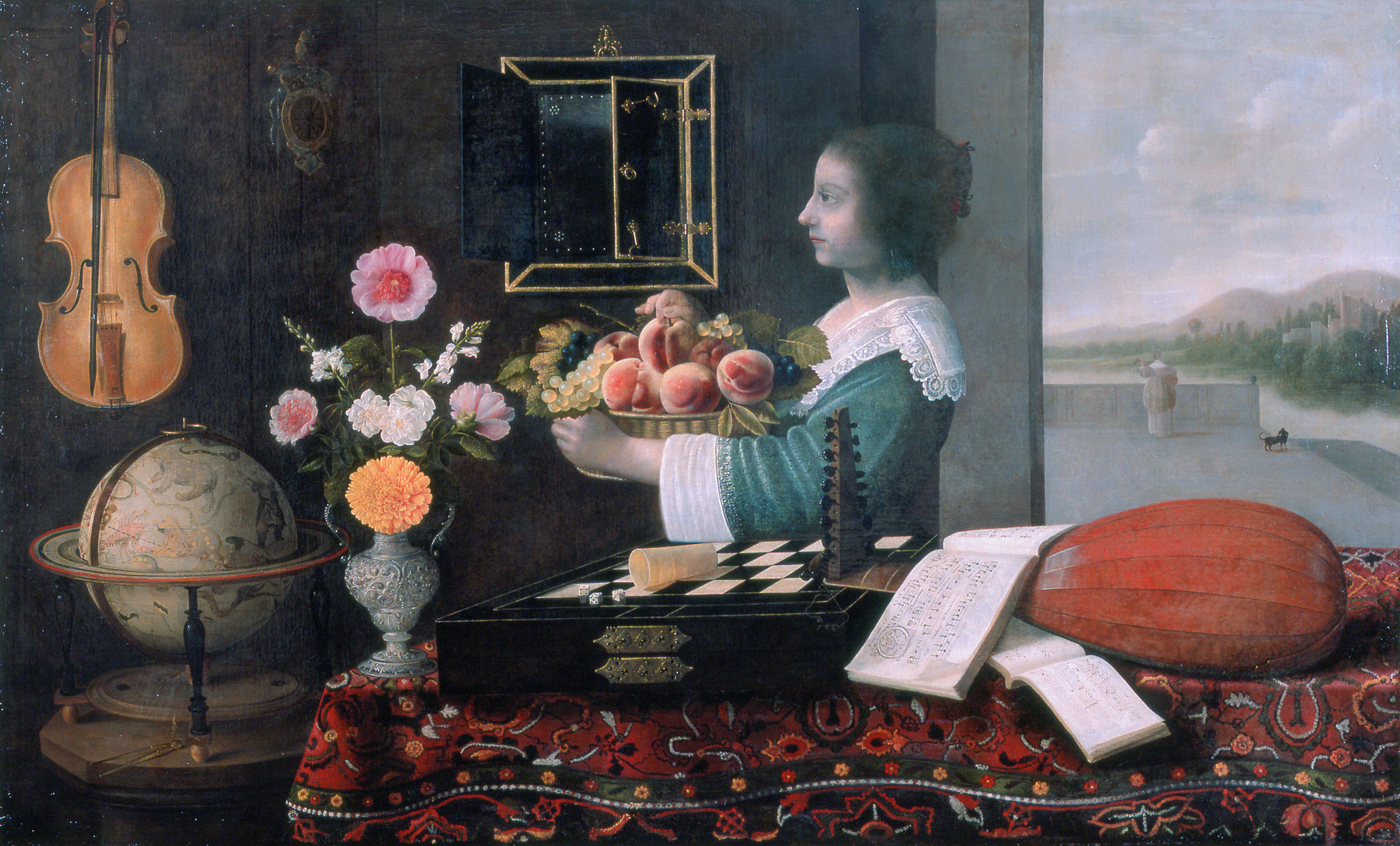
- Artist: Sebastian Stoskopff
- Completion date: 1633
- Medium: Oil paint on canvas
- Movement: Baroque painting Allegory; Still life
- Subject: Five Senses; Summer
- Dimensions: 114 cm × 186 cm (45 in × 73 in)
- Location: Musée de l'Œuvre Notre-Dame, Strasbourg
- Accession: 1941

The Five Senses, also known as Summer, is a signed and dated 1633 oil painting by Sebastian Stoskopff. It was painted at the height of the artist's stay in Paris from 1621 to 1640/1641. Together with its slightly wider pendant The Four Elements, or Winter (114 × 188 cm, or 45 × 74 in), it is today in the Musée de l'Œuvre Notre-Dame. Its inventory number is MBA 1695 ("MBA" stands for Musée des Beaux-Arts).

The Five Senses is considered as Stoskopff's masterpiece, together with his Great Vanity, a work of very different design. The politician, painter, and writer Robert Heitz declared in his 1975 book on the history of painting in Alsace that The Five Senses surpasses the Great Vanity in audacity and that only Johannes Vermeer, several decades later, would again attain such harmony in the reconstruction of reality ("Le seul Vermeer, trente ou quarante ans plus tard, parviendra à cette harmonieuse reconstruction de la réalité"). The young woman of the painting, strangely immobile and unattractive, reminds Heitz of Piero della Francesca, or Paul Delvaux. She is pictorially treated in the same way as the objects that surround her, as if she was just as inanimated, and part of the still life

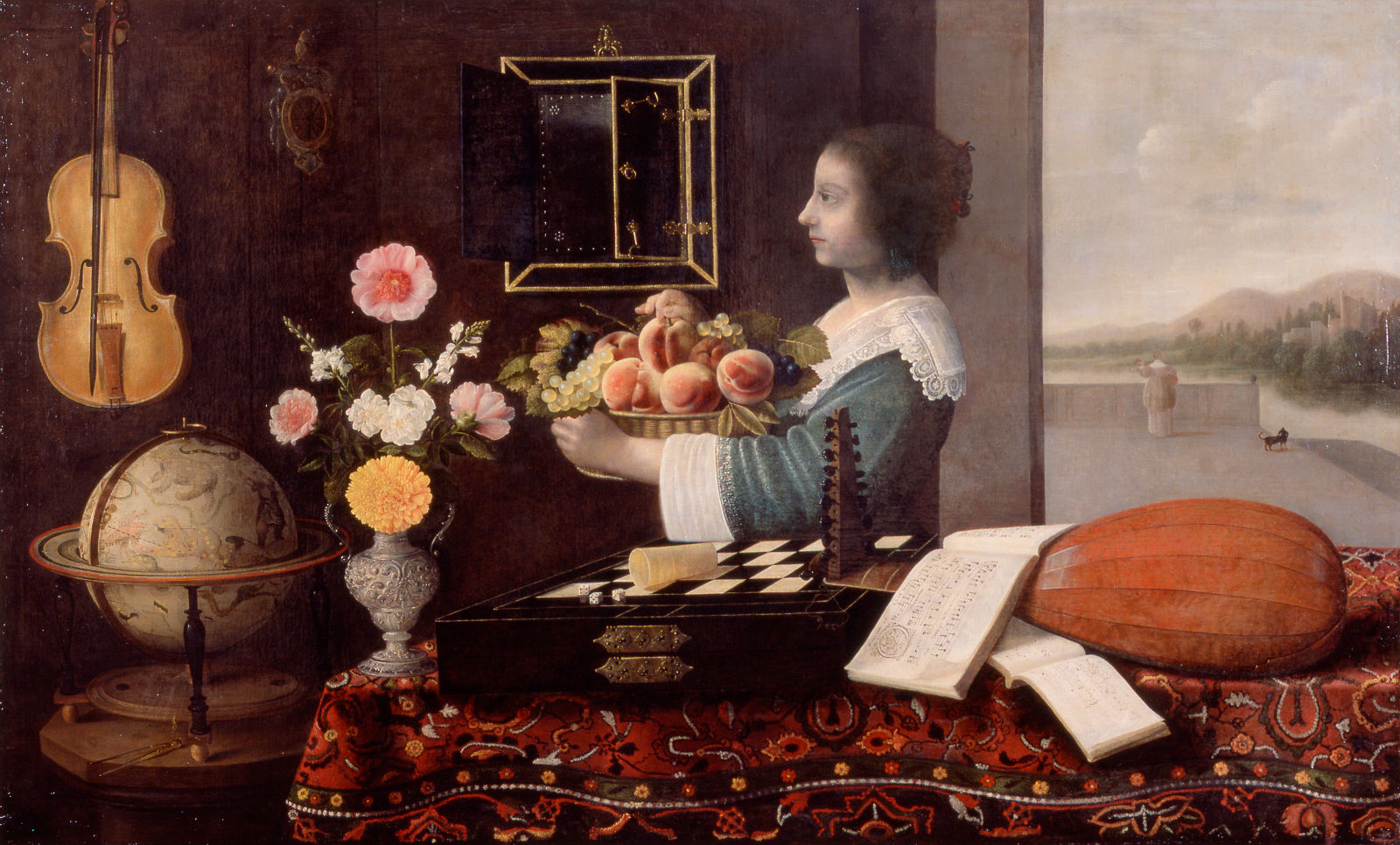
Another reproduction, with a different colour scheme

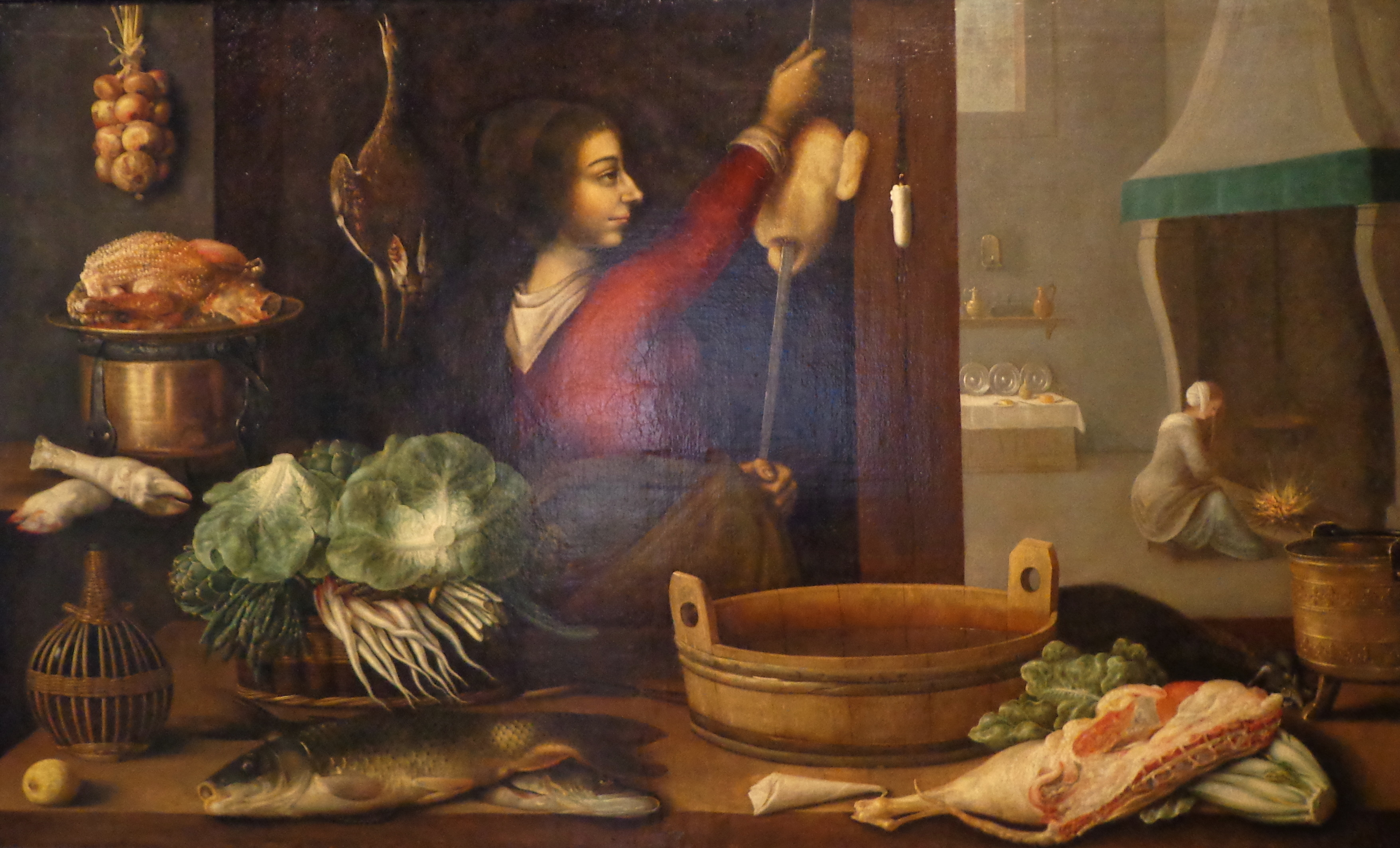
The Four Elements or Winter, the painting's pendant
