= Isaak Soreau =

German Baroque painter (1604-1644)

Isaak Soreau (1604 in Hanau – after 1645 in Frankfurt), sometimes exhibited as Jan Soreau, was a German Baroque painter most well known for his early still life work.

== Biography ==
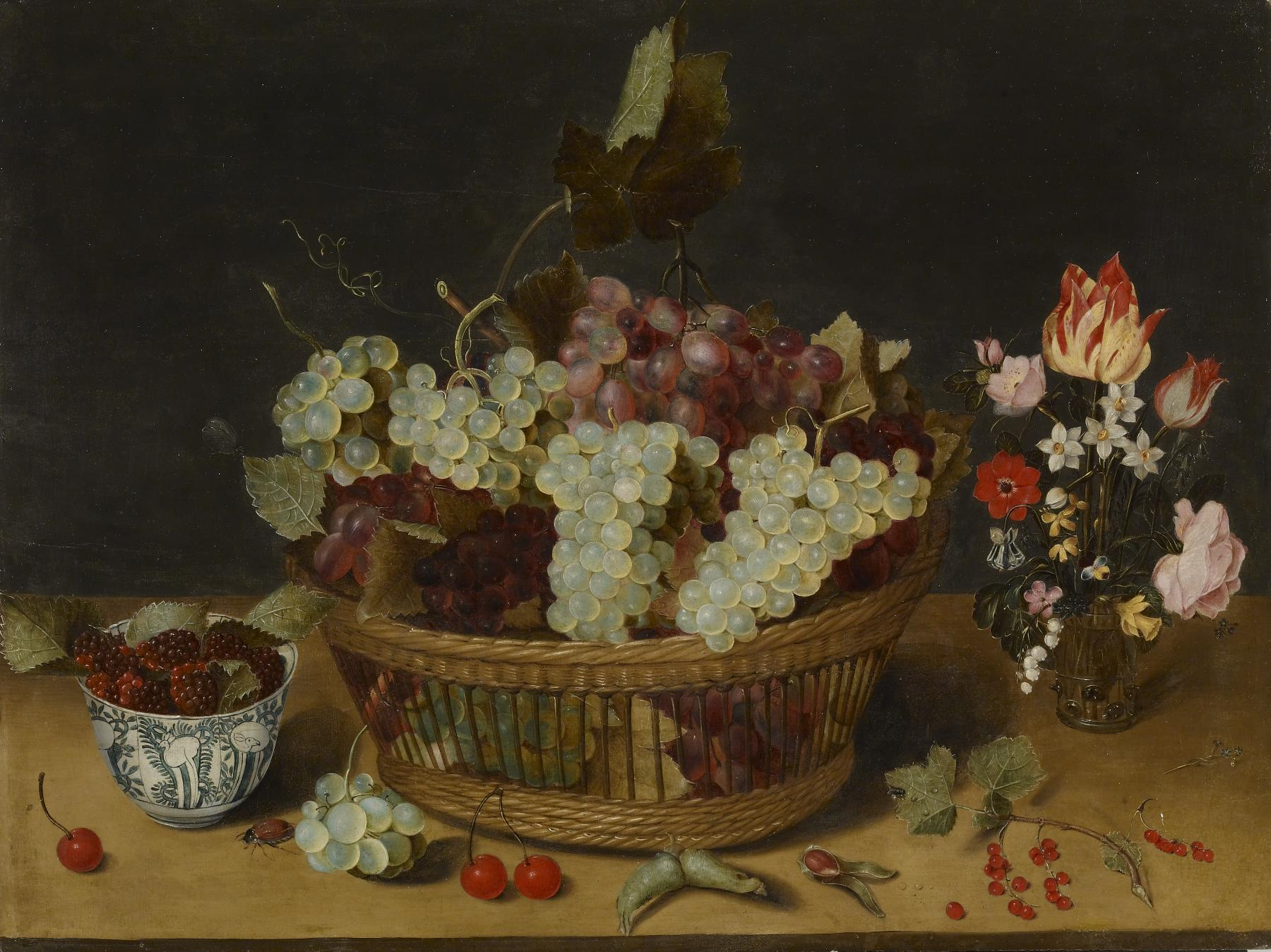
Still Life with Chinese Bowl and Vase of Flowers, Walters Art Museum

According to the RKD, he was the son of the Dutch painter Daniel Soreau, and the twin brother of Pieter Soreau. Both Pieter and Isaak were pupils of their father. His works are strongly reminiscent of the painter Jacob van Hulsdonck, leading historians to believe that he must have worked for him in his workshop in Antwerp at some point, though this as yet has not been firmly documented. It is likely that he was taught by Georg Flegel during his Frankfurt years, whose works have been attributed in the past to Osias Beert. Soreau specialized in "table-top still lifes," featuring fruits, flowers, and insects.

An Isaak Soreau was regent of the Nieuwe Zijds Huiszitten almshouse of Amsterdam in 1681.
