= Sebastian Stoskopff =

Alsatian painter (1597–1657)

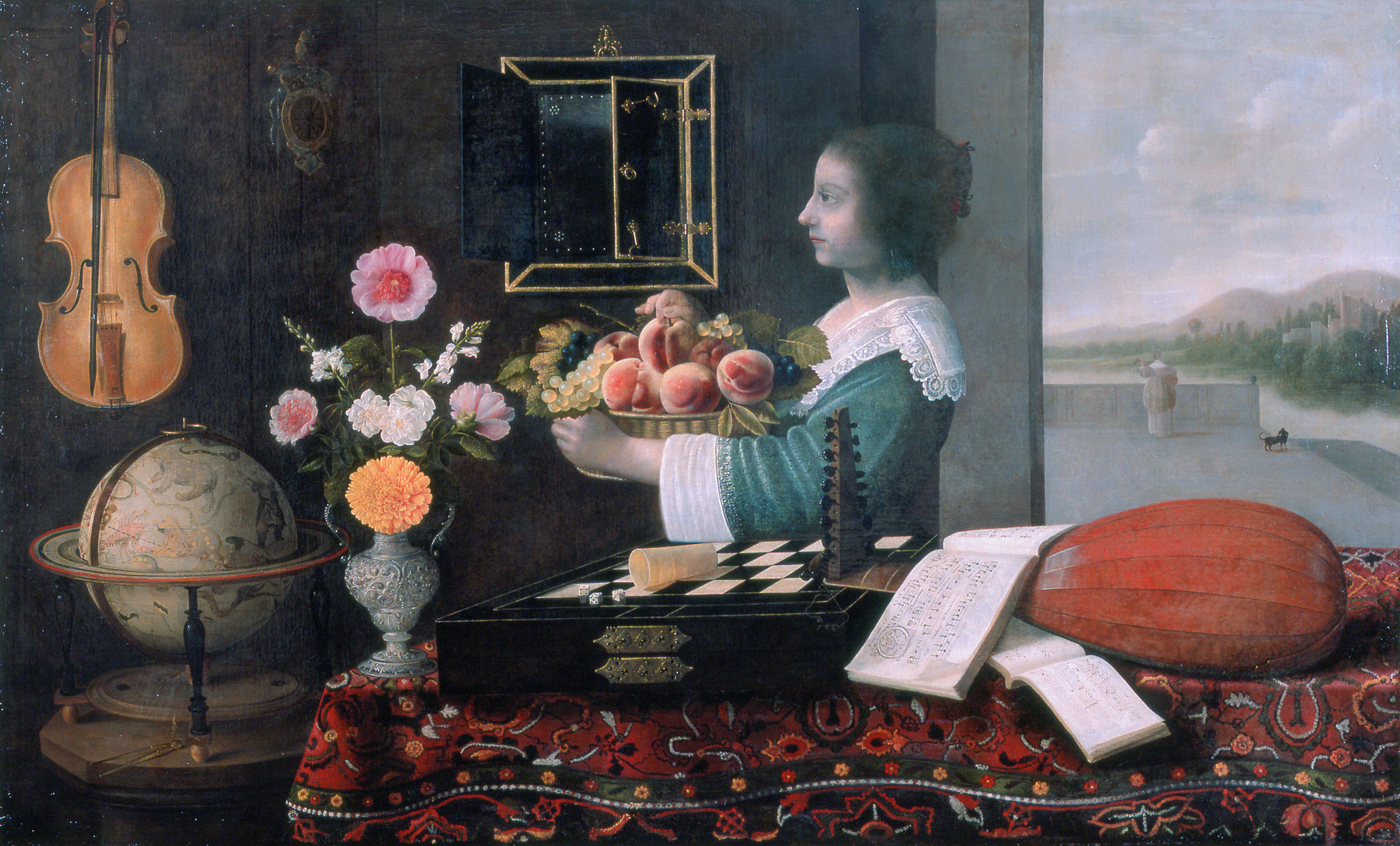
Summer or the Five Senses, 1633 (Musée de l'Oeuvre Notre-Dame, Strasbourg)

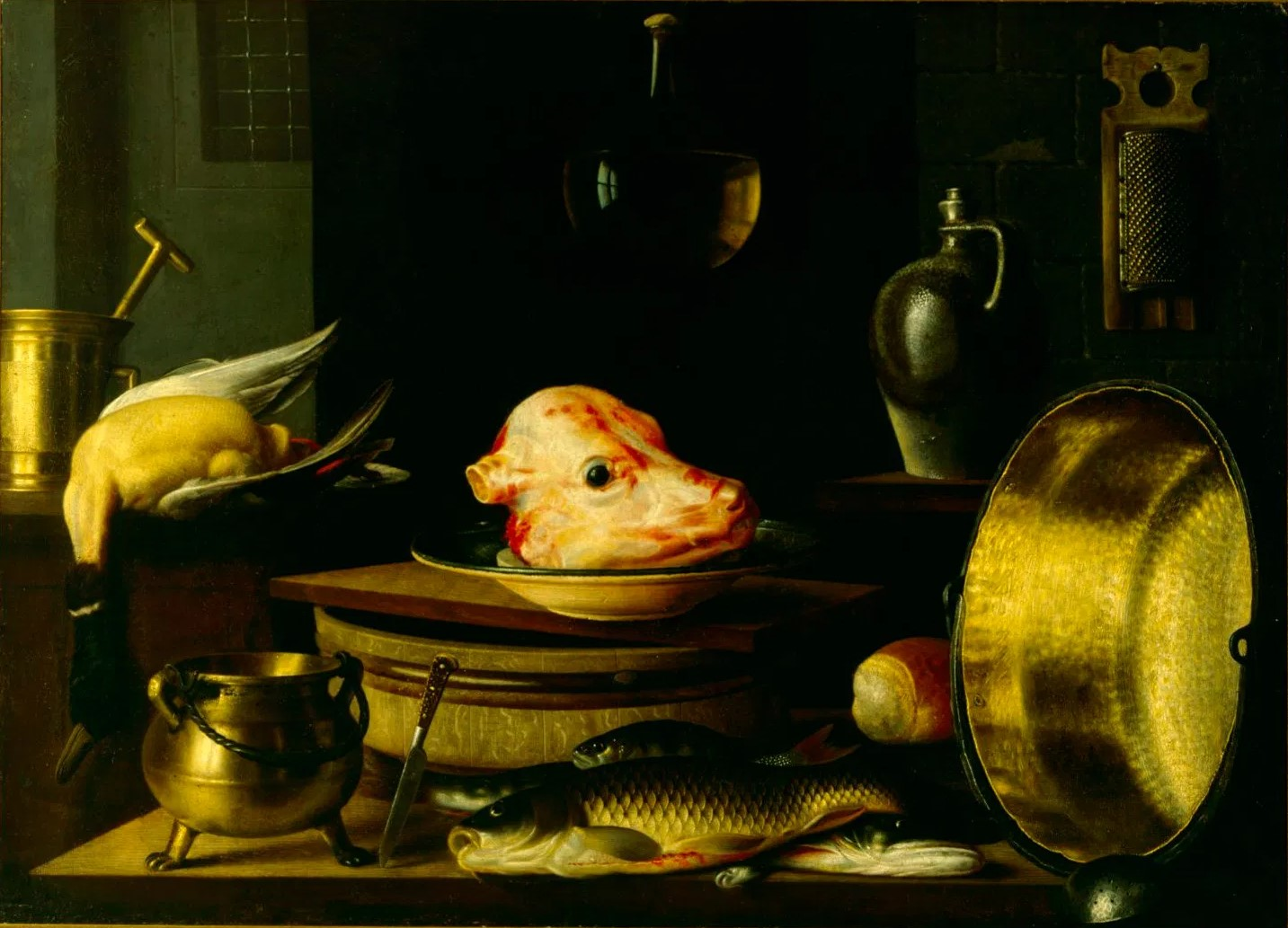
Kitchen Still Life with a Calf's Head, 1640 (Saarland Museum, Saarbrücken)

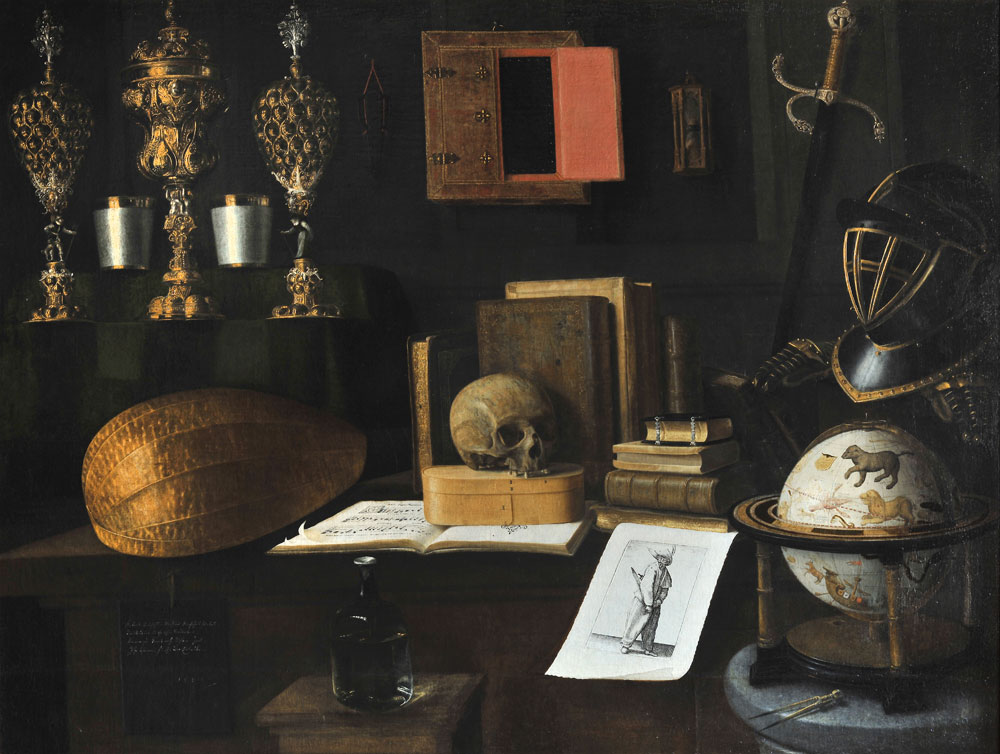
Great Vanity 1641 (Musée de l’Œuvre Notre-Dame)

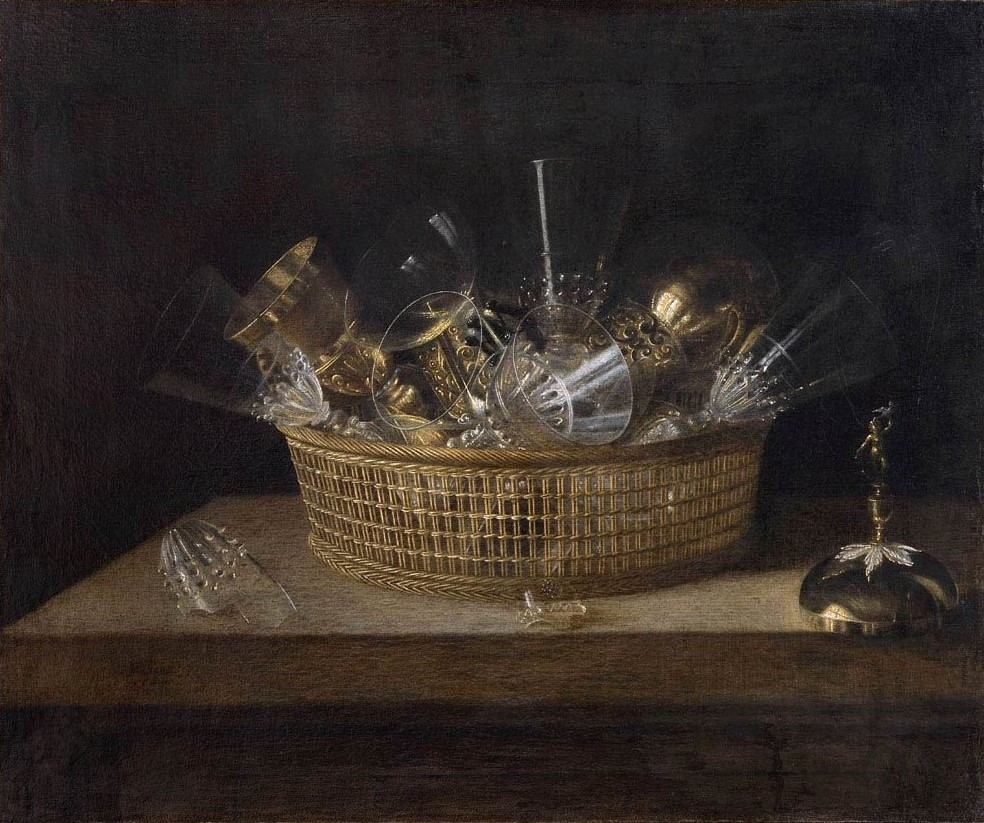
Glasses in a Basket 1644 (Musée de l’Œuvre Notre-Dame)

Sebastian (or Sébastien) Stoskopff (July 13, 1597 – February 10, 1657) was an Alsatian painter. He is considered one of the most important German still life painters of his time. His works, which were rediscovered after 1930, portray goblets, cups and especially glasses. The reduction to a few objects, which is characteristic of early still life painting, can again be recognized in Stoskopff's painting. His chief works hang in his hometown of Strasbourg, but some of the world's most important art museums (the Met, the Louvre, the KHM, the Gemäldegalerie) own paintings by Stoskopff as well.

== Life ==
Sebastian Stoskopff was born in 1597 in Strasbourg. His father was employed by the city since 1590 and acted as a mounted courier or royal escort, driving a one-horse carriage. In 1614, Stoskopff's father asked the Strasbourg council for help for his 17-year-old son. He wanted him to be able to learn the craft of painting, since Sebastian had already been extremely talented in drawing and painting since he was 15. The council agreed to provide their support and probably sent the young artist at first to the Strasbourg painter and copper engraver, Friedrich Brentel. However, he only learned how to further refine his drawing and was not, as hoped, introduced to the art of painting.

In 1615, Stoskopff's father died and his widowed mother went to the Strasbourg council once again to ask for support for training from a recognized painter. Stoskopff was then sent to Daniel Soreau, a painter who was active in Hanau. In the beginning, Soreau was not very enthusiastic, since he usually chose his apprentices from among his relatives and close friends. However, he finally complied with the request of the council and assured them that would "make an Albrecht Dürer of this apprentice". There is not a single definite picture by Daniel Soreau existing. It is only possible to draw conclusions about how well the master passed on his artistic skills to his students through the works of his sons, other apprentices of his workshop and through Stoskopff's works.

After Soreau's death in 1619, Stoskopff took over his workshop with the apprentices, as well as his function as the master. One of the apprentices was Joachim von Sandrart, who later became a successful painter and who wrote the first important work on the history of art in the German language: "Teutsche Academie der Bau-, Bild,- und Malerey- Künste". This work contains descriptions of the lives of earlier and contemporary artists, including descriptions of the time in Hanau with his master, Sebastian Stoskopff.

After his attempt to get permission to settle in Frankfurt failed, Stoskopff went to Paris. He stayed there from about 1622 until 1639, which can be reconstructed from indirect reports and property inventories of Parisians. His first works in larger format were also created here, such as "Summer" or "Winter" (now both in Strasbourg). A contemporary statement from Sandrart proves his residence in Paris: "Von dannen [gemeint ist Hanau] verreiste er in Frankreich und hinterließ viele gute Werke; von Pariß zoge er nach Italien (allwo ich ihn zu Venedig Anno 1629 gesehen), hernach wieder zurück nach Pariß und so fürters nach Straßburg [...] ("From there [meaning Hanau], he travelled to France and left many good works; from Paris, he moved to Italy (where I saw him in Venice in 1629), afterwards again back to Paris and further to Strasbourg [...]").

Stoskopff returned to Strasbourg in 1639. This could have been for familial reasons or because of the strong increase of religious conflict in Paris. One year later, he joined the guild of Steltz, to which other painters, copper engravers and craftsmen in the arts belonged. There were several arguments between the artist and the guild after he joined it, among other things because Stoskopff loved his freedom as an independent and self-responsible artist and did not want to operate a workshop with apprentices, as was usually done. He achieved wealth and prestige in Strasbourg and married the stepdaughter of his youngest sister in 1646.

As of 1650, Stoskopff oriented himself more and more toward Idstein, where he maintained a close and good relationship to the Count Johannes von Nassau und Idstein in his last phase of creativity up until his death. The Count was a Lutheran and supported the Protestant Union. He was Stoskopff's most important patron at this time. Joachim von Sandrart was an important contact man who negotiated about Stoskopff's paintings with the Count.

Sebastian Stoskopff died in 1657 at the age of 60 in a public house in Idstein. He was reported to have died because of drinking too much alcohol. Nearly 20 years later, Stoskopff's murder became clear during an indictment for witchcraft, in which the owner of the public house and a woman were involved.

== Influence ==
Although Sebastian Stoskopff was influenced by Georg Flegel regarding artistic composition, it is not known whether he had known Flegel during his lifetime or whether he saw Flegel's works only after his death. Furthermore, his influence appears to have been "rather sporadic and not long lasting".

== Gallery ==
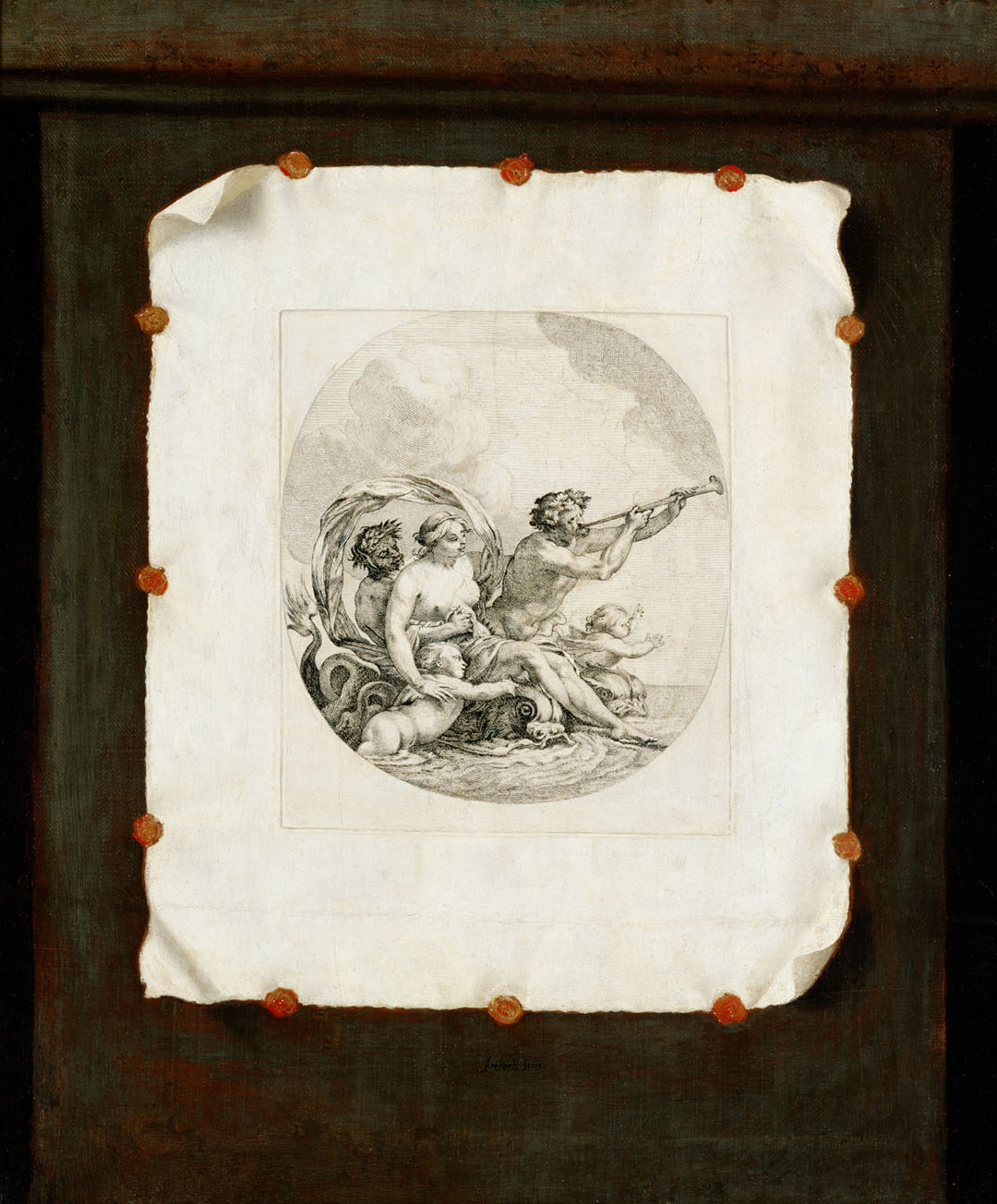
Trompe l’Oeil (Galatea) (Kunsthistorisches Museum)

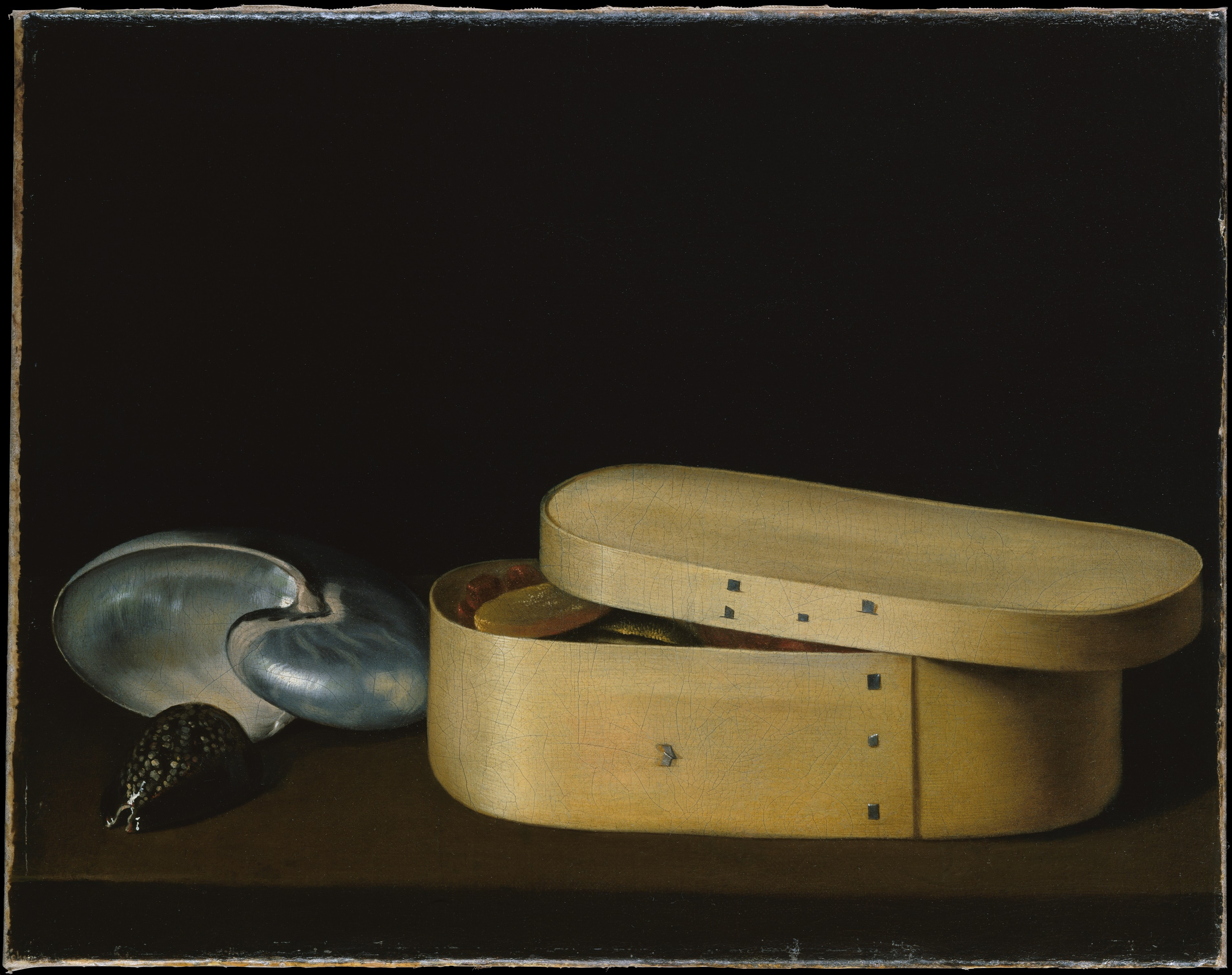
Still Life with Shells and a Chip-Wood Box (Metropolitan Museum of Art)

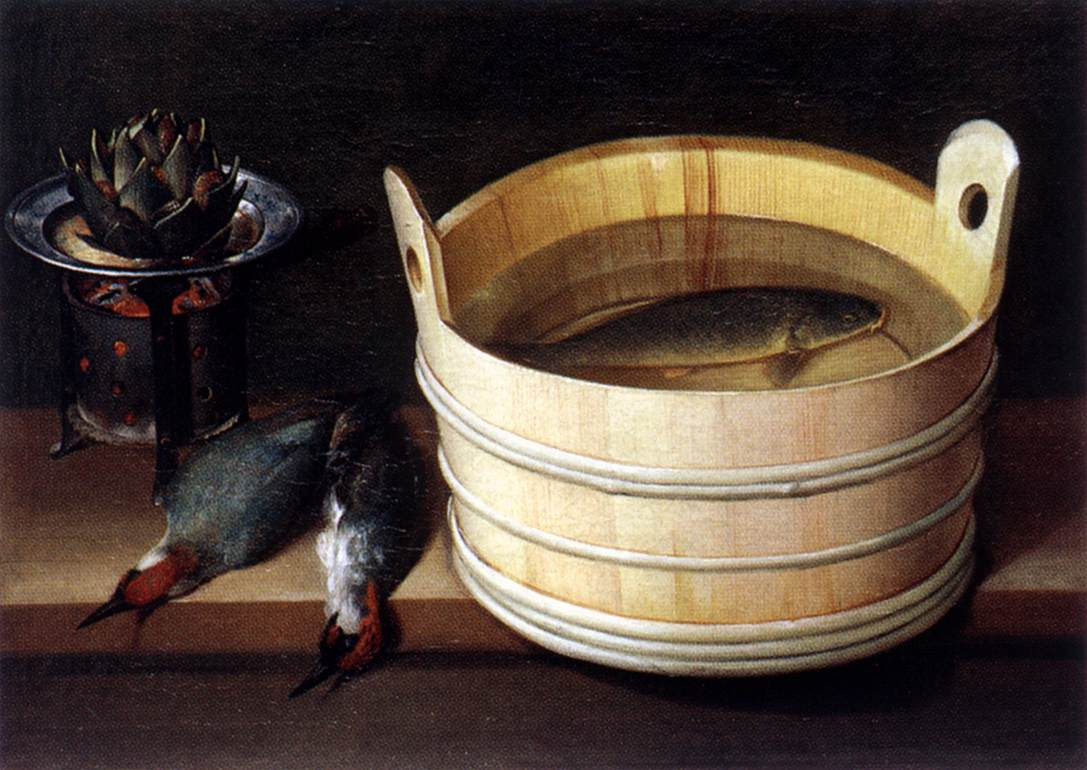
The Four Elements (Kunstmuseum Basel)

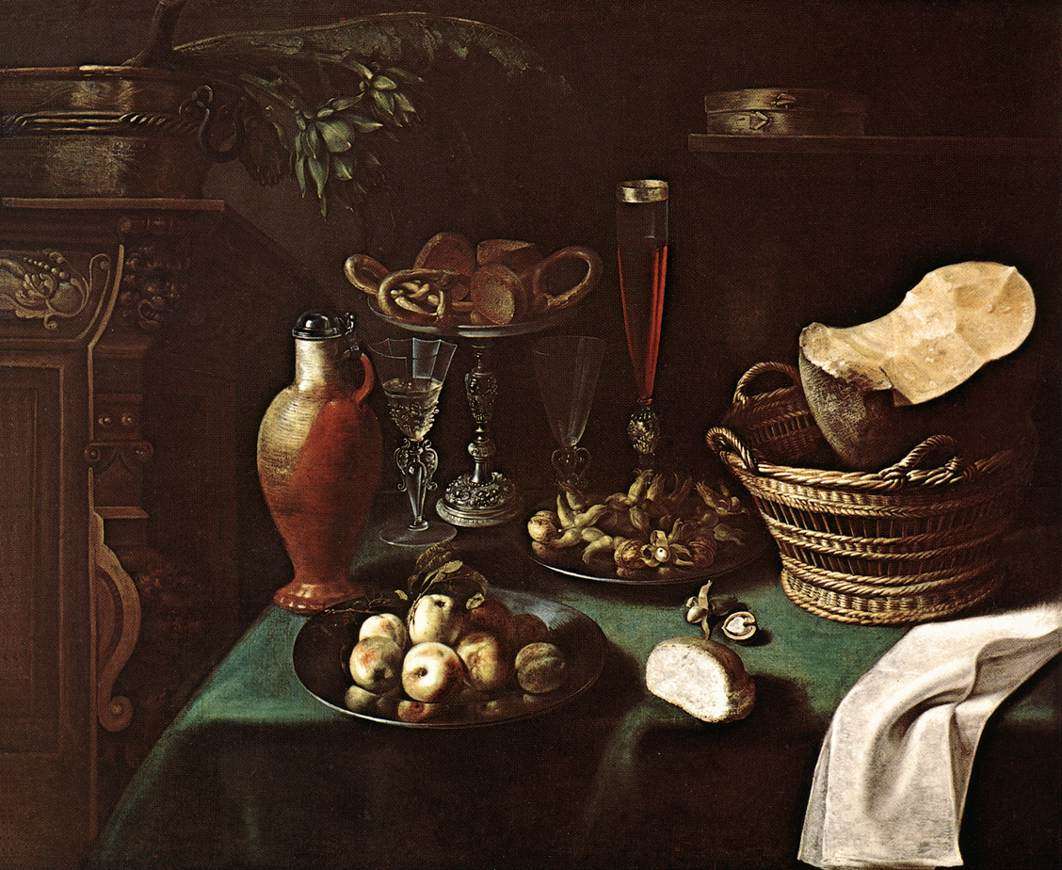
Large Still Life (Residenzgalerie)

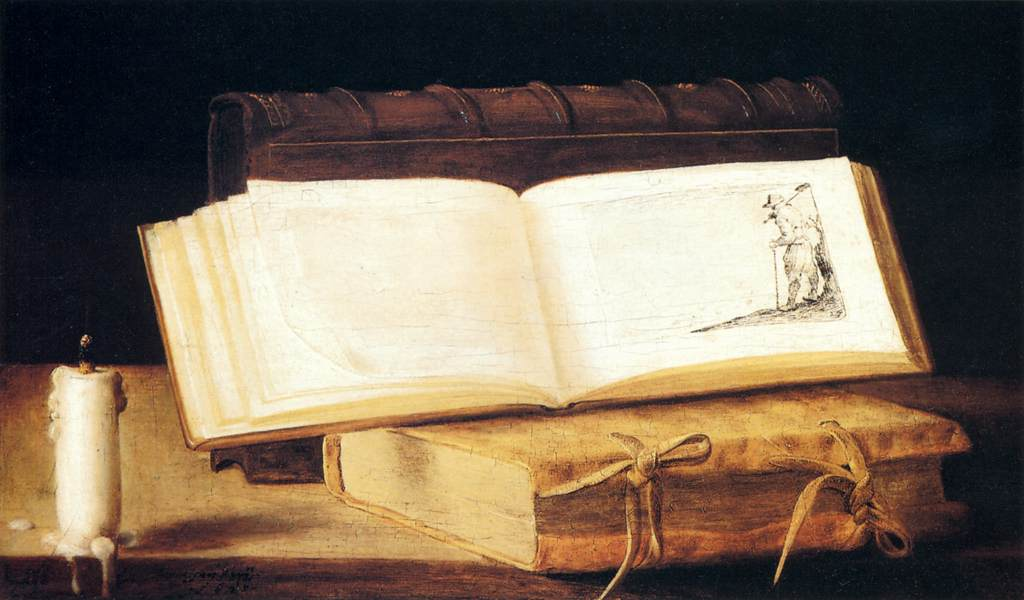
Books and a Candle (Museum Boijmans Van Beuningen)

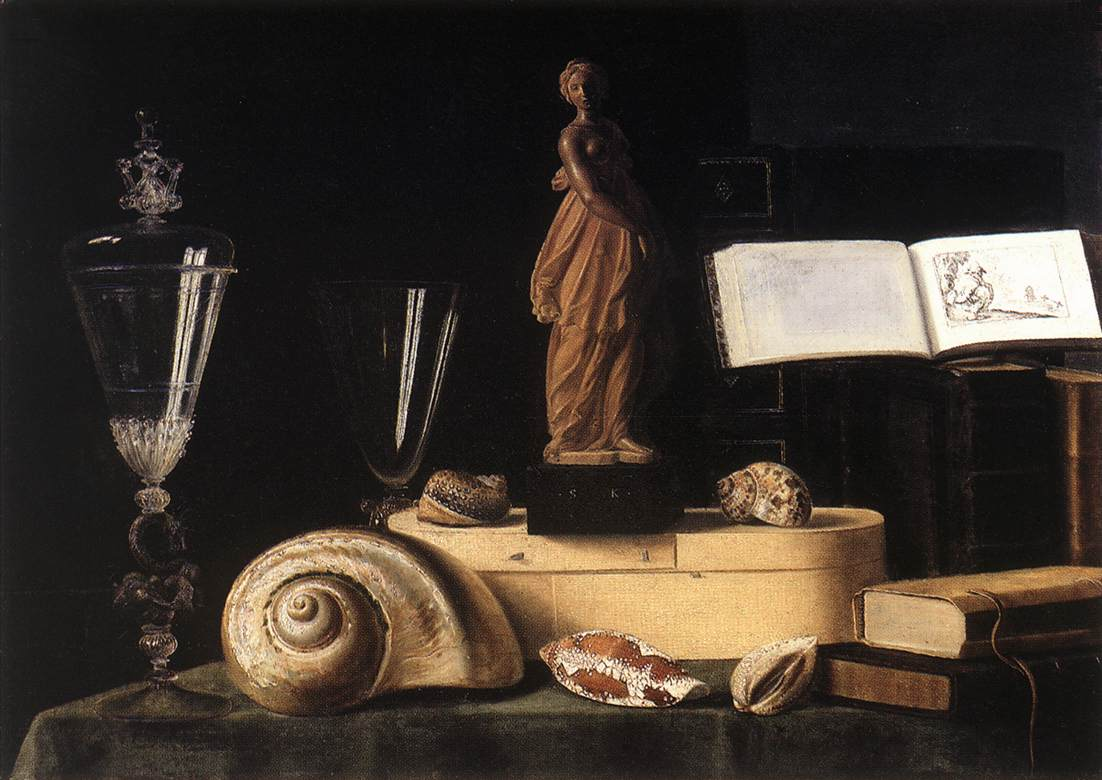
Still Life with Statuette and Shells (Louvre)

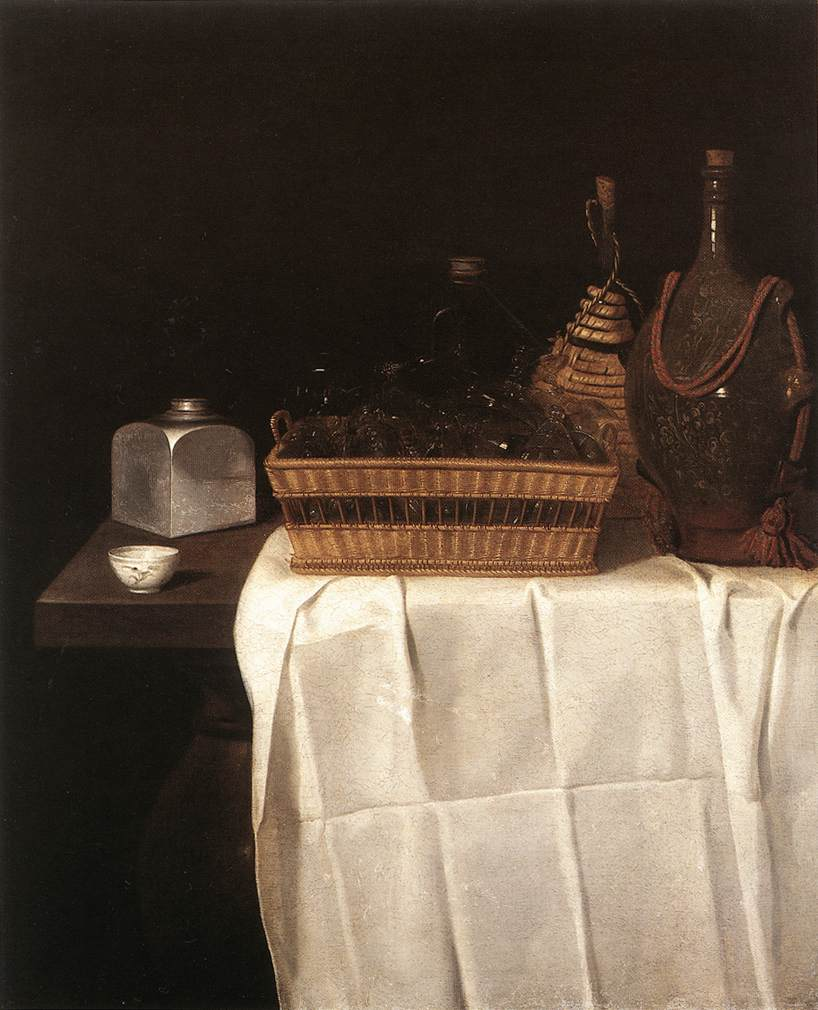
Still Life with Glasses and Bottles (Gemäldegalerie, Berlin)

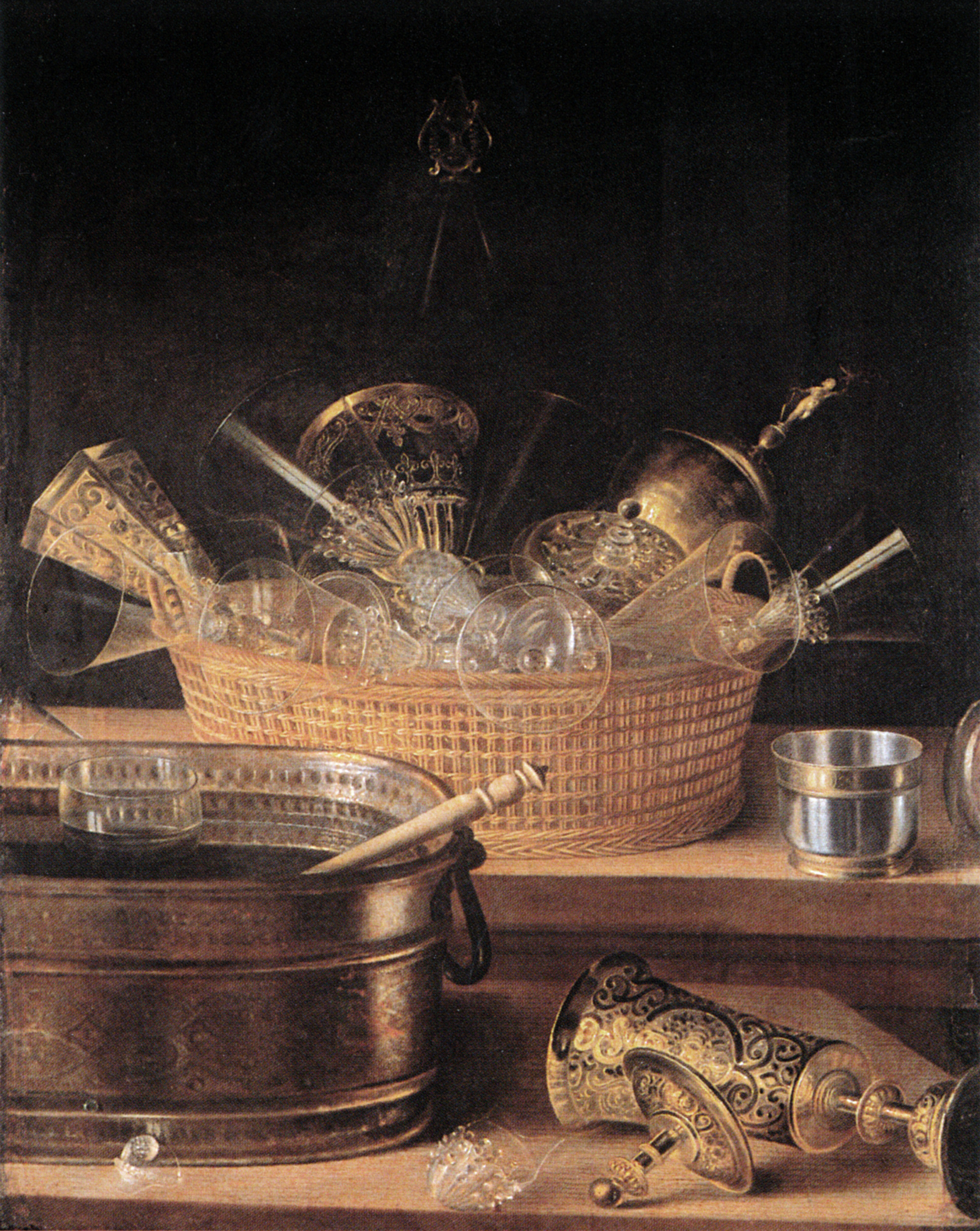
Metal Vessels and Glassware in a Basket (Staatliche Kunsthalle Karlsruhe)

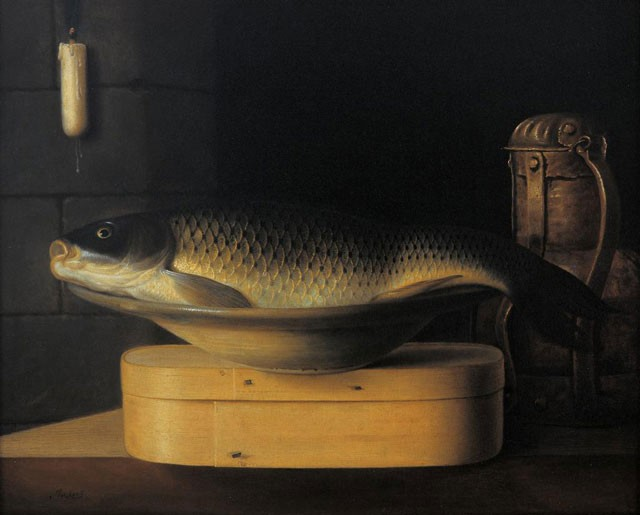
Still Life with Carp on a Chip Box (Kunsthalle Bremen)

== Further information ==
=== Literature ===
All references in German, except where noted

- Ebert-Schifferer, Sybille (1998): Die Geschichte des Stillebens. Munich: Hirmer. ISBN 3-7774-7890-3
- Hahn - Woernle, Birgit: Sebastian Stoskopff: Mit einem kritischen Werkverzeichnis der Gemälde. Stuttgart 1996.
- Müller, Prof. Dr. : Die Stilleben- Bildkunst des Sebastian Stoskopff. In: Ausst.- Kat. Sebastian Stoskopff- sein Leben- sein Werk- seine Zeit, publ. by Prof. Dr. Wolfgang J. Müller/ Silvia Berger. Idstein 1987.
- Heck, Michèle- Caroline: Sébastian Stoskopff: 1597–1657. Un maître de la nature morte. Strasbourg 1997. (in French, also available as a German translation)
