= Daniel Soreau =

German painter (c.1554–1619)

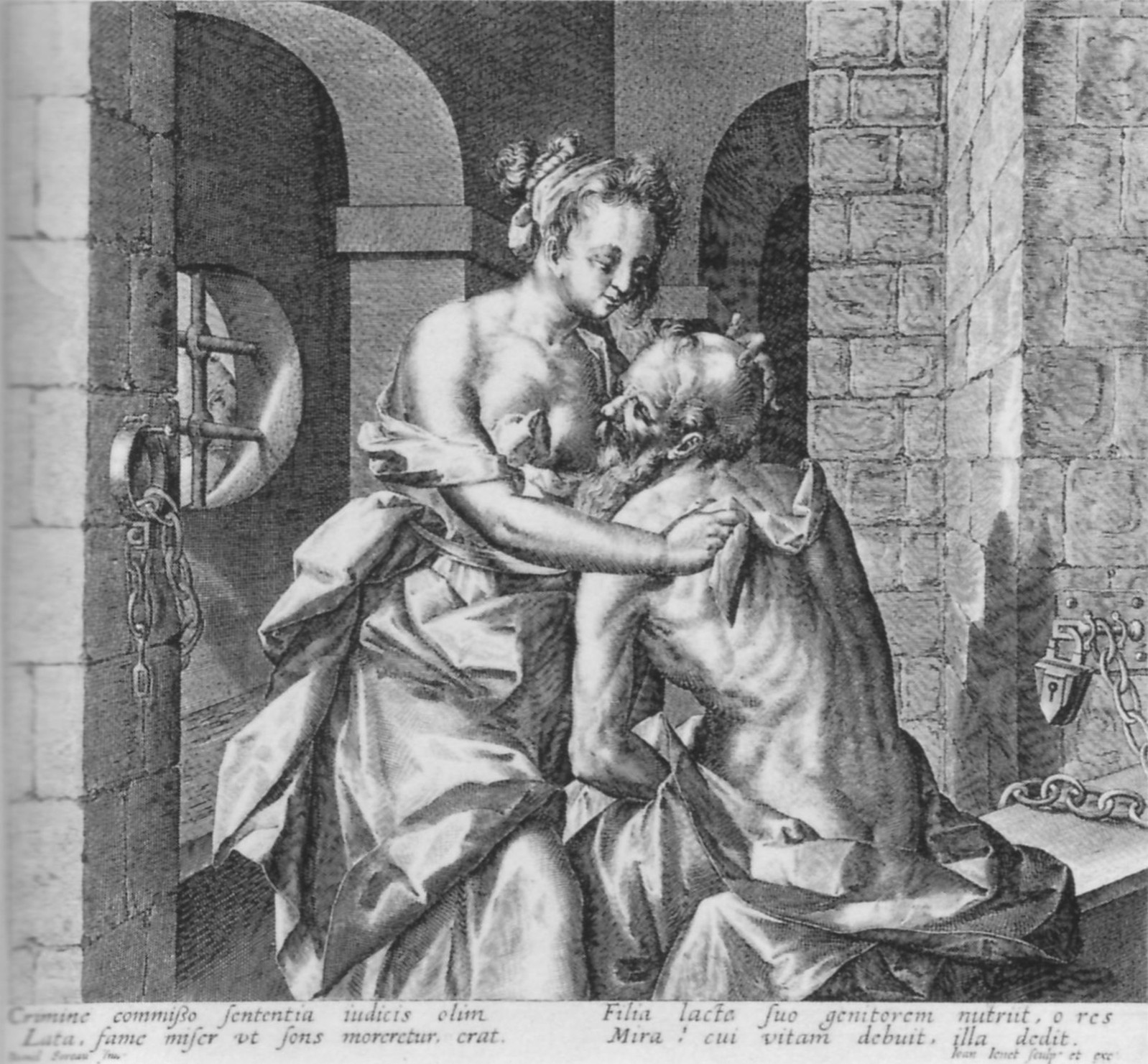
Scene of Cimon and Pero in prison, engraving after Daniel Soreau

Daniel Soreau (c.1554 – 28 March 1619) was a wool trader and still life painter from the Southern Netherlands who was active in Frankfurt.

== Biography ==
Soreau was born in Tournai in 1554. He became a citizen of Frankfurt in 1586. He married Johanna Flamen. He inherited a wool trading company from his father Johann Soreau. He ran this company together with his brother Simon Soreau and his brother-in-law Stefan van Ninhoven, but could not prevent its bankruptcy in 1601. At times, the company had controlled the entire wool trade of Hesse and Wetterau.

The painter and biographer Joachim von Sandrart wrote in his Teutsche Academie that Soreau became a painter at a more advanced age than usual. His pupils were his twin sons Isaak and Pieter, Francesco Codino, Sebastian Stoskopff and Joachim von Sandrart. Soreau died only a year after Sandrart became his pupil in 1618.

After Soreau died at Frankfurt, his workshop was taken over by Stoskopff, who had been his pupil from 1615.

== Work ==
Sandrart stated that Soreau was good at painting "stillstehenden Sachen" (stationary subjects, probably meaning still lifes). No paintings by Soreau are known to date. However, there are engravings after Soreau by Johann Jenet, which are of subjects other than still lifes. A still life with a fruit basket has been attributed to him a few times, but without sufficient documentation. It is now believed to be by Jacob van Hulsdonck, who influenced Isaak Soreau.
