= Great Vanity (Stoskopff) =

Painting by Sebastian Stoskopff

- Grande Vanité (French)
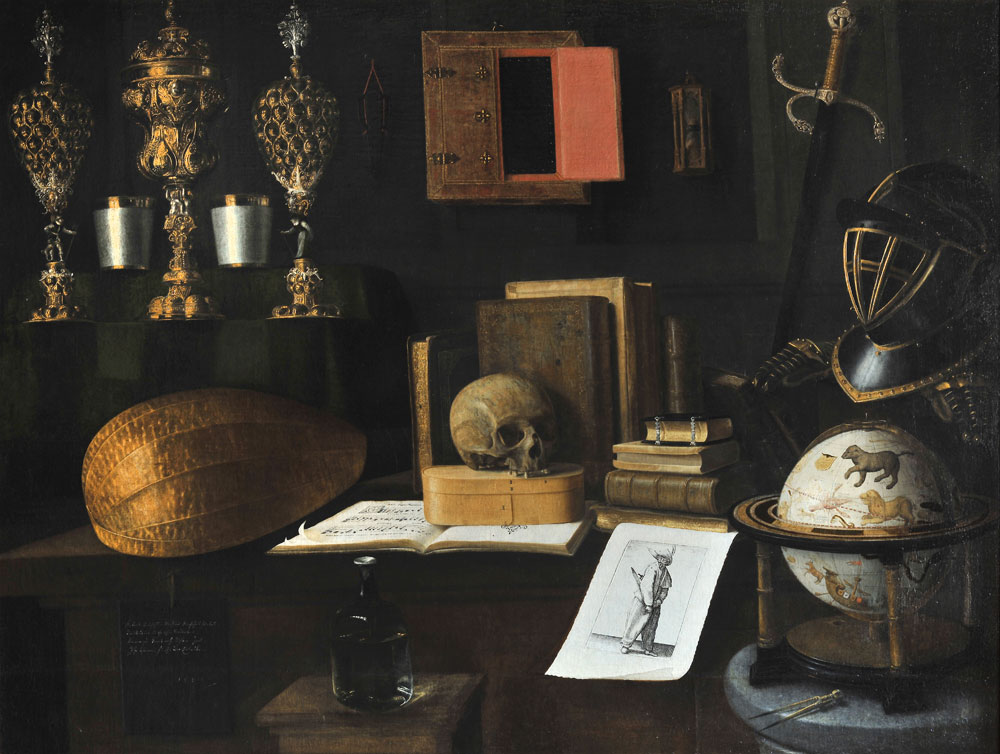
- Artist: Sebastian Stoskopff
- Year: 1641
- Medium: oil painting on canvas
- Movement: Baroque painting Allegory; Still life
- Subject: Vanity
- Dimensions: 125 cm × 165 cm (49 in × 65 in)
- Location: Musée de l'Œuvre Notre-Dame, Strasbourg
- Accession: 1931

The Great Vanity is a 1641 Baroque allegorical still life painting by the Alsatian artist Sebastian Stoskopff. It is on display in the Musée de l'Œuvre Notre-Dame. Its inventory number is MBA 1249 ("MBA" stands for Musée des Beaux-Arts).

The painting is the last, largest, and most ambitious of Stoskopff's vanitas still-lifes, and the sum of his painterly achievements at this point in his career (Stoskopff had just settled again in his hometown of Strasbourg, after many years in Paris). Among the multiple symbolic elements of its iconography relating to the frailty of existence and death, it quotes an engraving by Jacques Callot, depicting a jester. The three elaborate hanaps in the upper left edge of the painting are faithful depictions of works by Stoskopff's brother-in-law Nicolas Riedinger, a master goldsmith in Strasbourg since 1609. The whole composition consciously repeats Stoskopff's slightly morbid Kitchen Still Life with a Calf's Head from 1640 (see below), which had already been a Memento mori of sorts.

A poem in German written with chalk on a board hanging from the left side of the table reveals the meaning of the painting:

Kunst, Reichtum, Macht und Kühnheit stirbet, Die Welt und all ihr Tun verdirbet. Ein Ewiges kommt nach dieser Zeit ; Ihr Toren, flieht die Eitelkeit.

(Art, Wealth, Power and Audacity die
The World and all its Doing perish
Eternity arrives once this Time is over
Fools that you are, run away from Vanity)

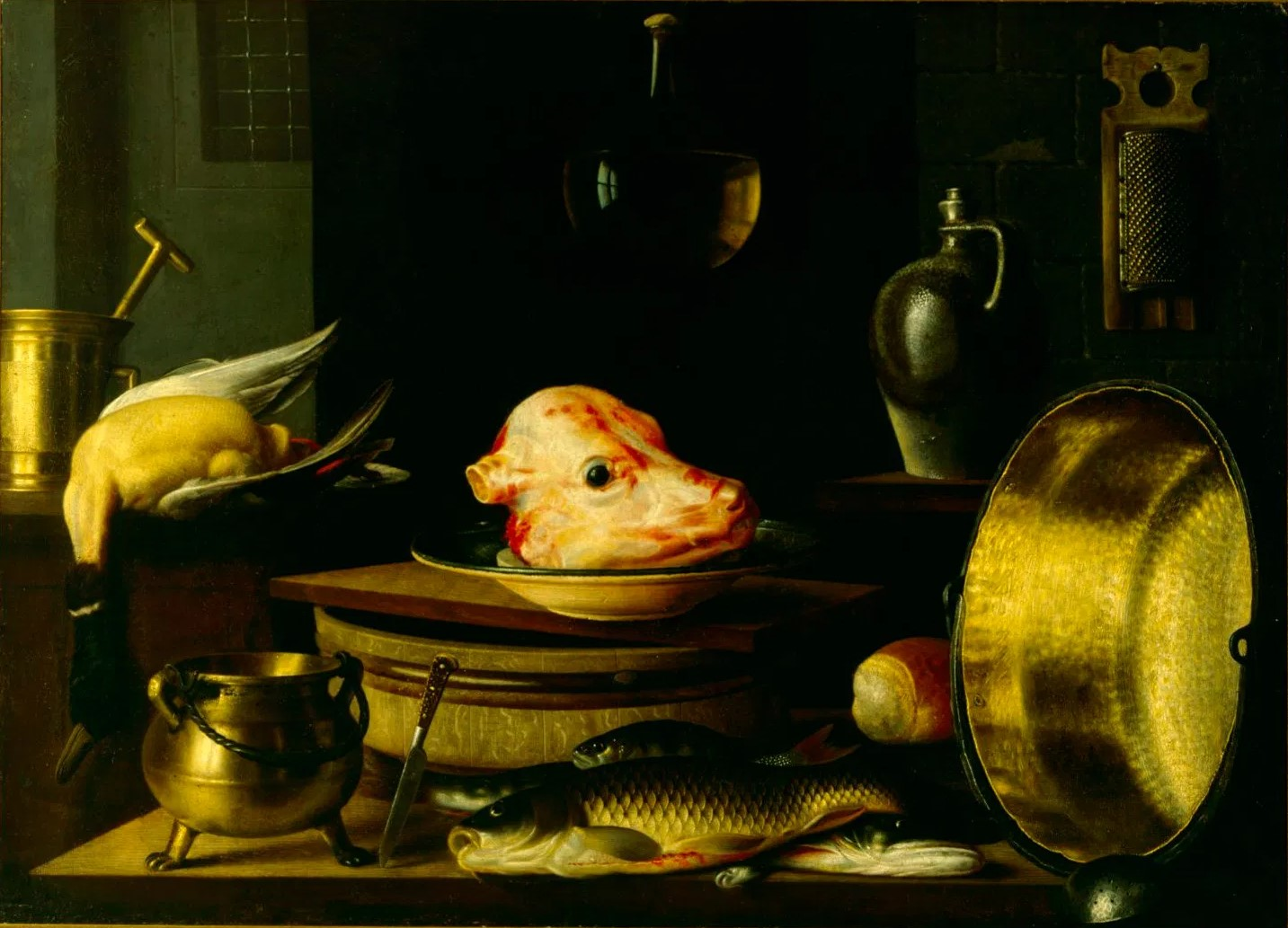
Kitchen Still Life with a Calf's Head (Saarland Museum Saarbrücken)
