= Georg Flegel =

German painter (c.1566–1638)

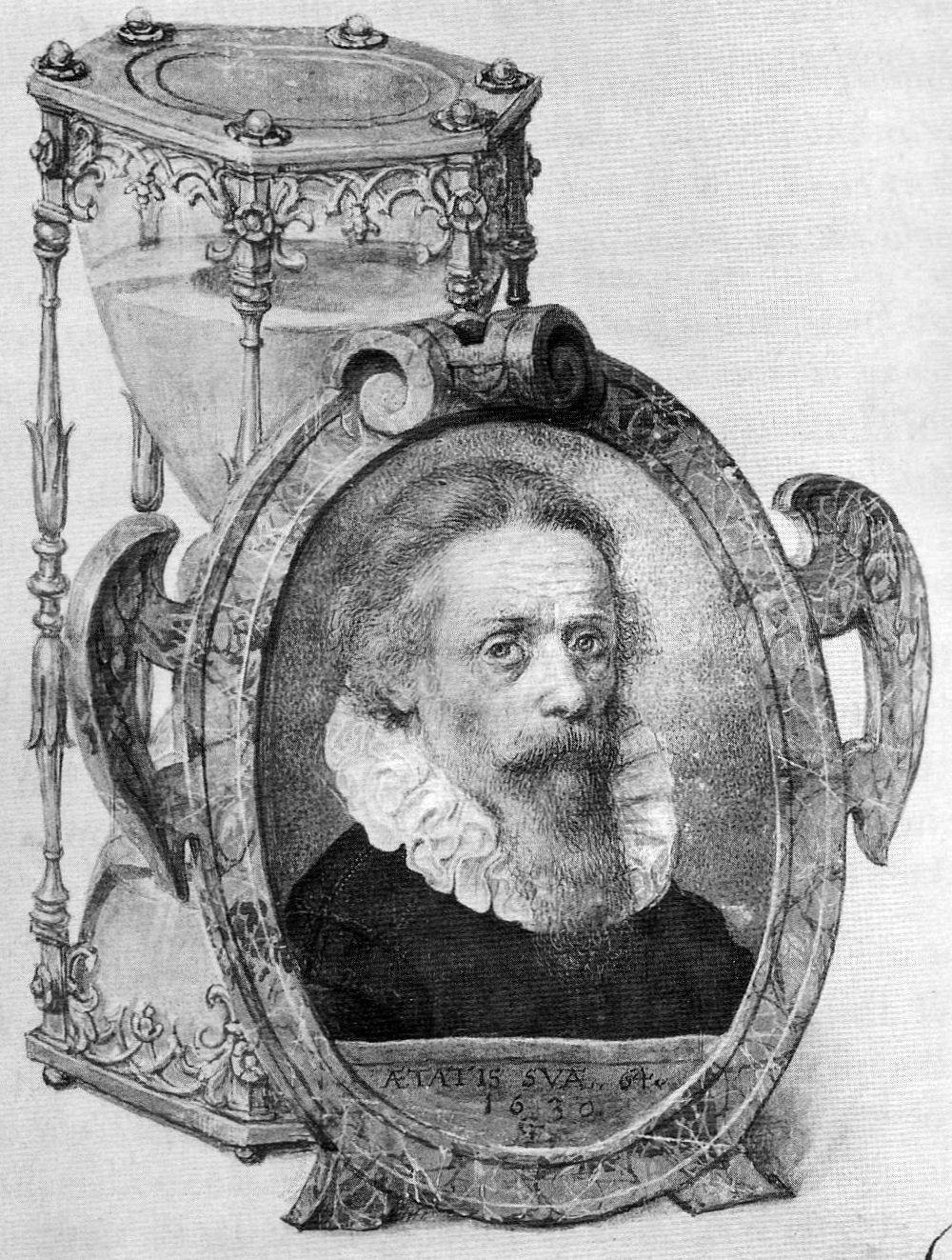
Self-portrait with hourglass, 1630

Georg Flegel (c. 1566 – 23 March 1638) was a German painter, best known for his still-life works. Born in Olomouc, he later worked in Frankfurt, where he became a leading figure in early German still-life painting.

== Early life and education ==
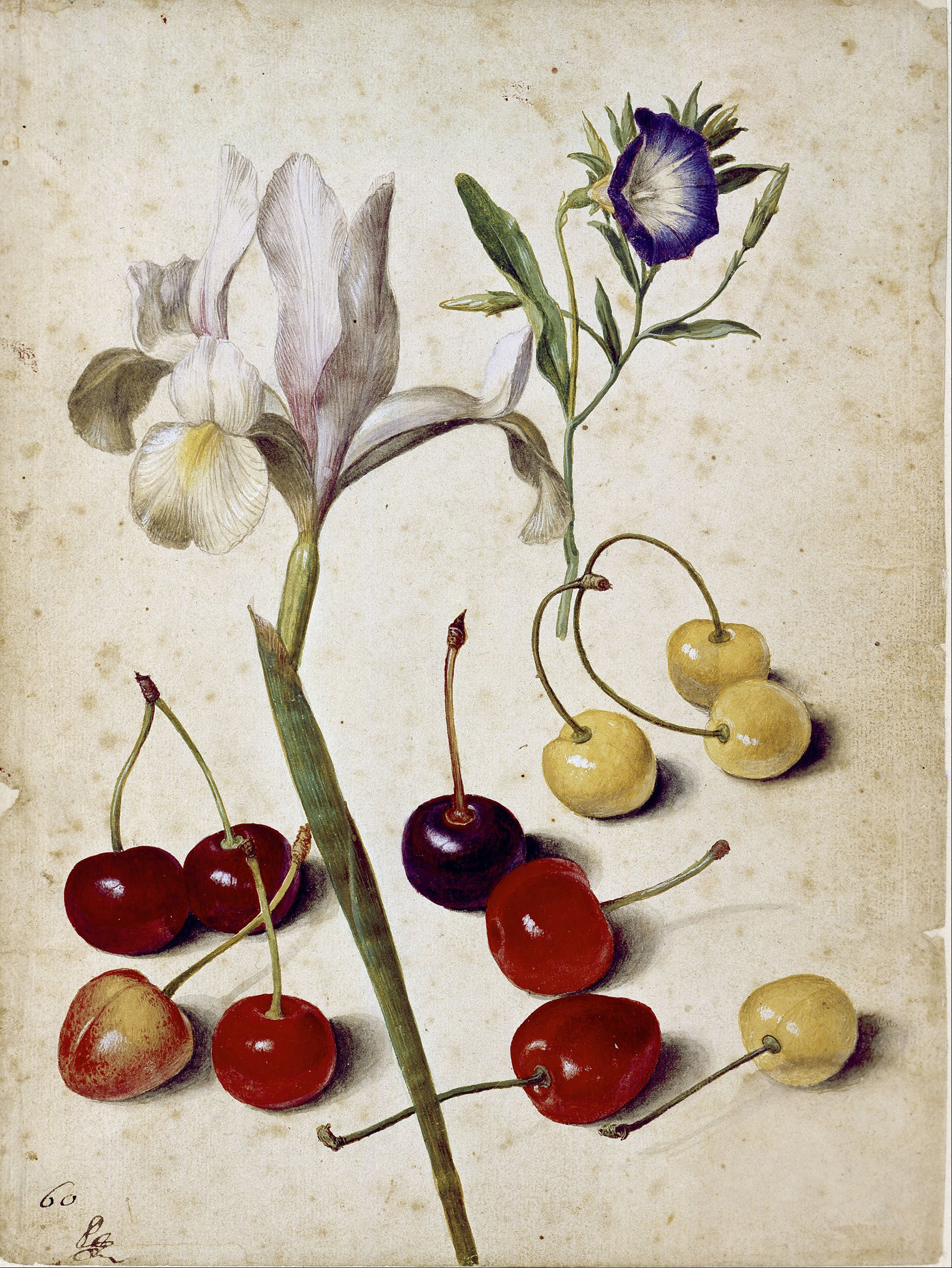
Still life with Spanish iris, morning glory, and cherries by Georg Flegel

Flegel was born in Olomouc, Moravia (now in the Czech Republic). Around 1580, he moved to Vienna, where he worked as an assistant to Lucas van Valckenborch, a painter and draughtsman. He was a pupil of Valckenborch in Linz from 1582 to 1592.

Flegel later moved to Frankfurt, then an important centre for art dealing. As an assistant, he added elements such as fruit, flowers, and table utensils to Valckenborch's compositions.

He is probably the same person identified by Kramm in Utrecht as "Juriaen Vlegel, constschilder," recorded in the protocol of the notary Verduyn on 21 March 1616. If so, he may have moved there following the establishment of the Utrecht Guild of St. Luke and might have known other still-life painters active in the city at that time, such as Roelandt Savery and Balthasar van der Ast.

== Notable works ==
In a period of about 30 years (c. 1600–1630), Flegel produced around 110 watercolor and oil paintings, mostly still lifes depicting tables set for meals and arranged with food, flowers, and occasional animals. Among his students were his sons Friedrich (1596/1597–1616) and Jacob (probably identical with Leonhard, 1602–1623), as well as the flower painter Jacob Marrel.

Flegel died in 1638 in Frankfurt.

Paintings

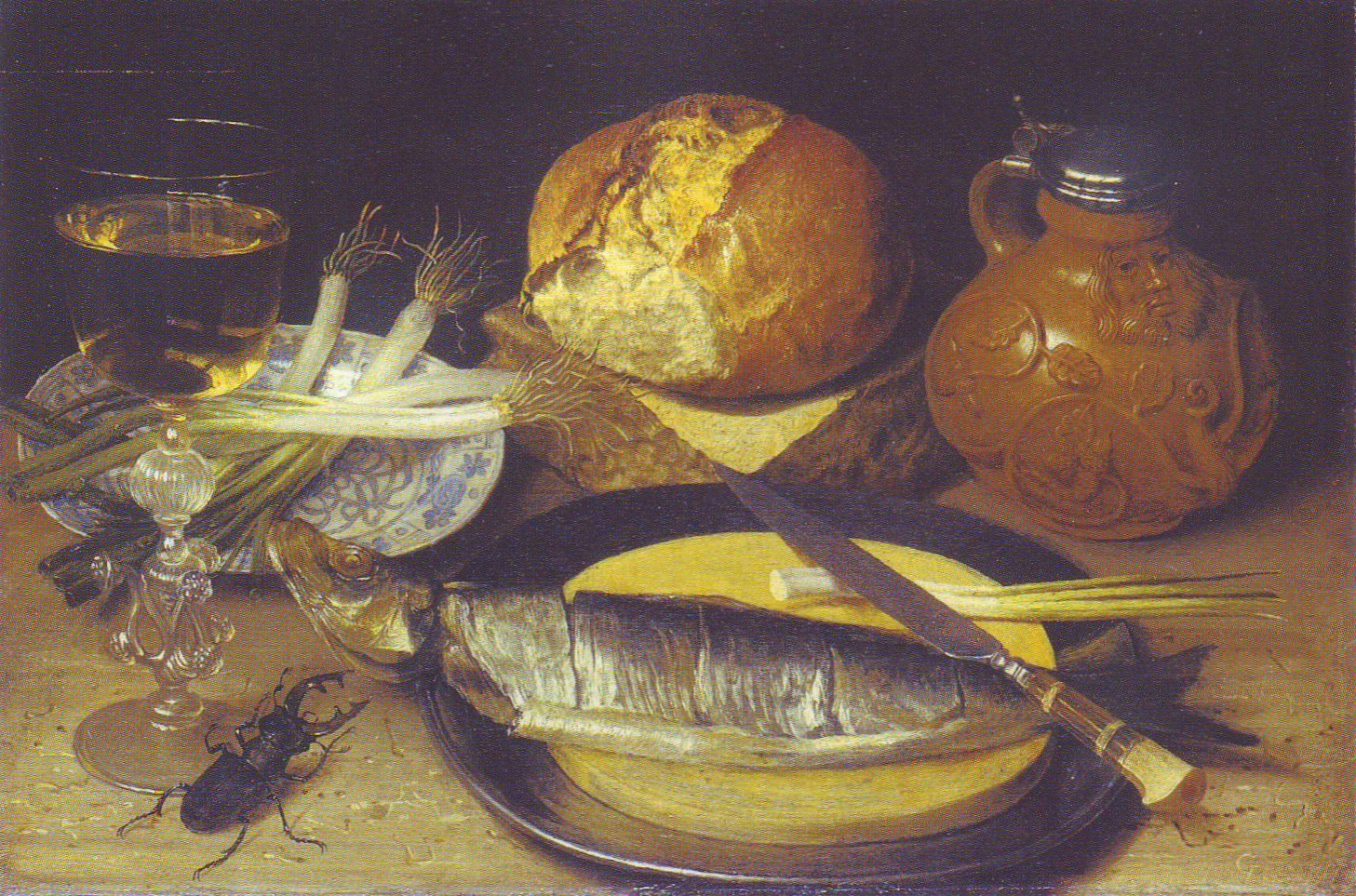
Breakfast with Herring, Bartmann Pitcher and a Stag Beetle

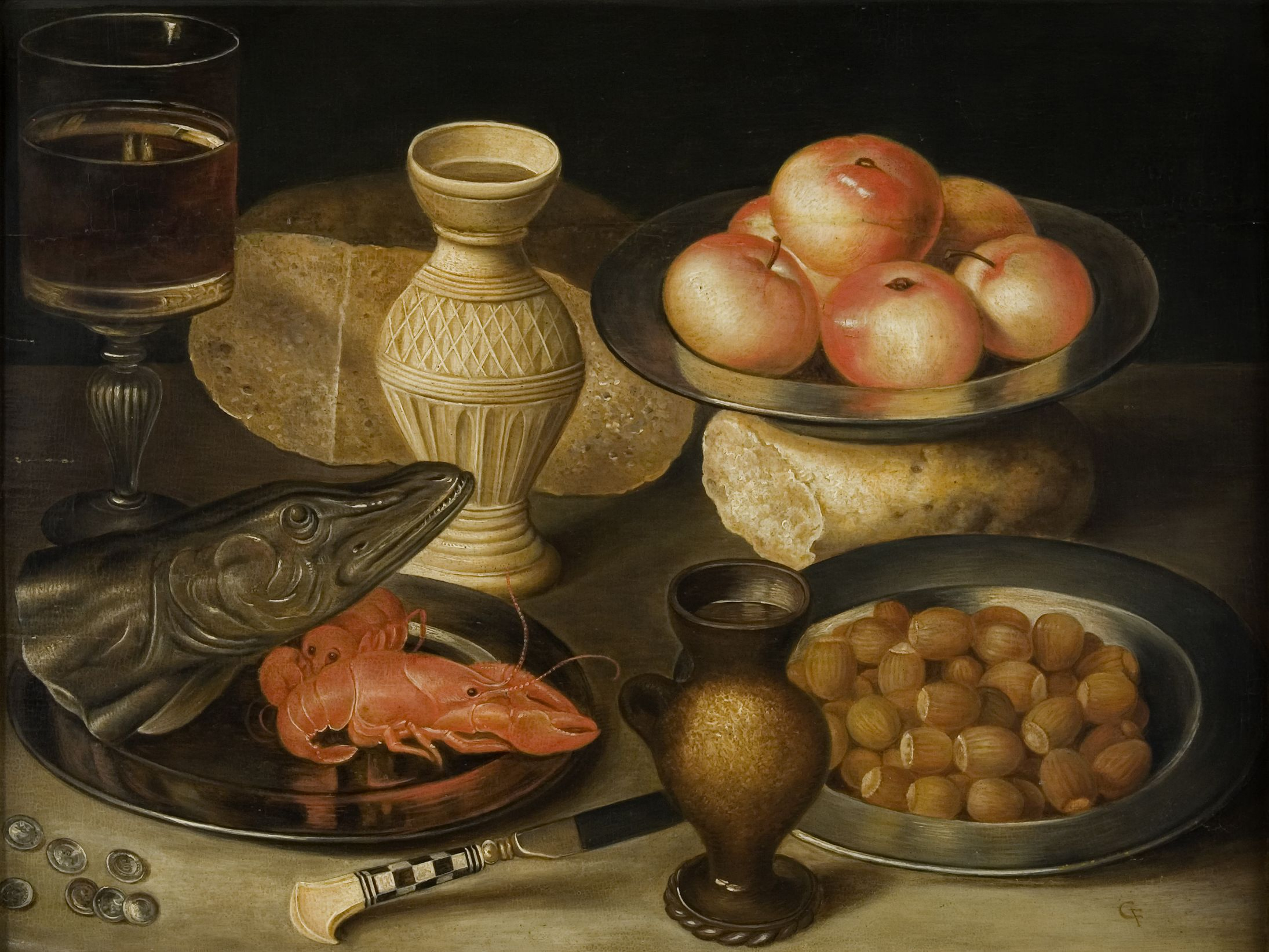
Still Life with Bread, Hazelnuts, Seafood and Apples

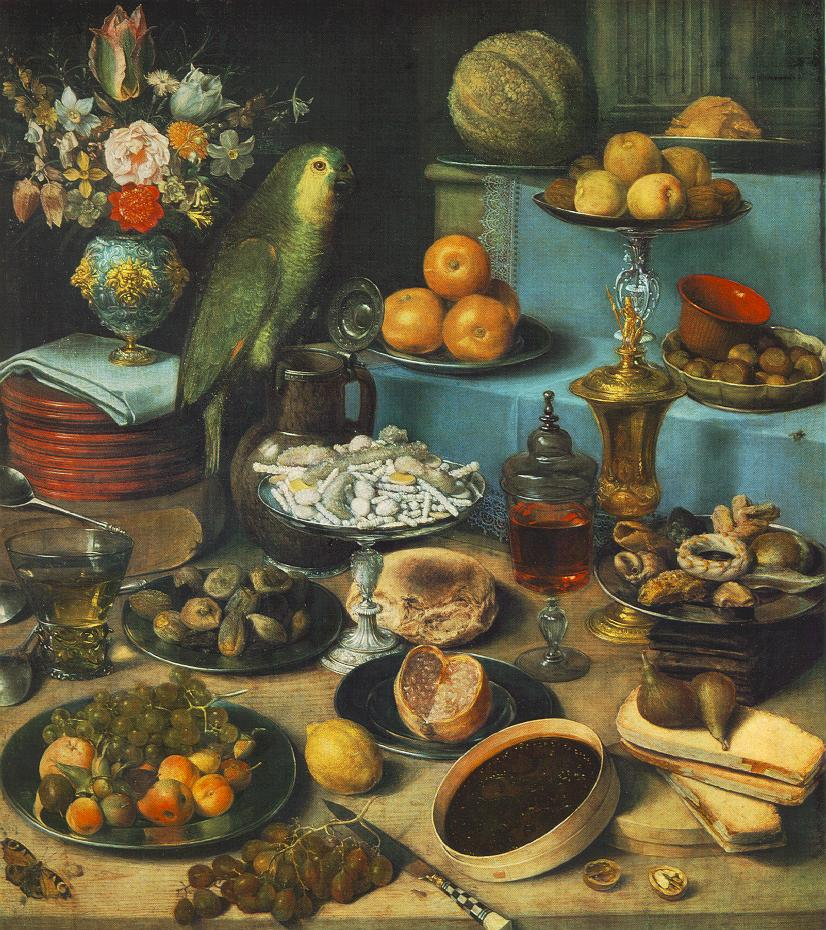
Still Life with Parrot

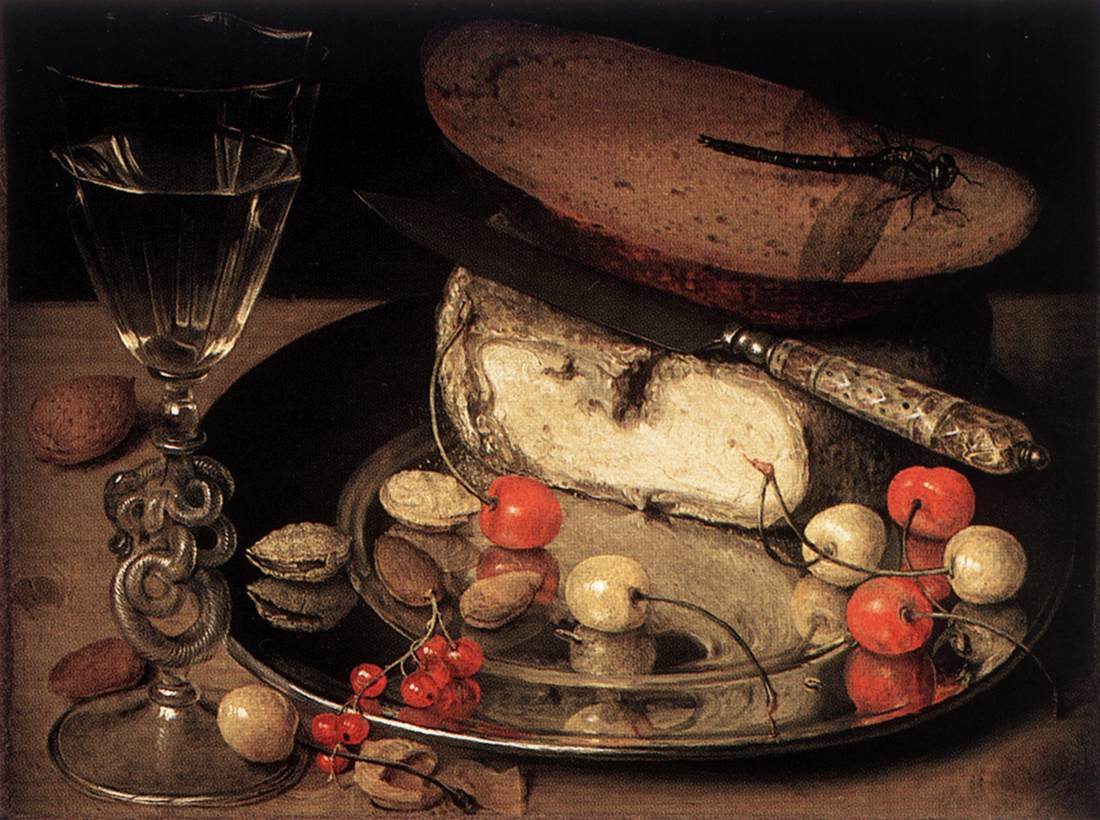
Still Life with Cherries

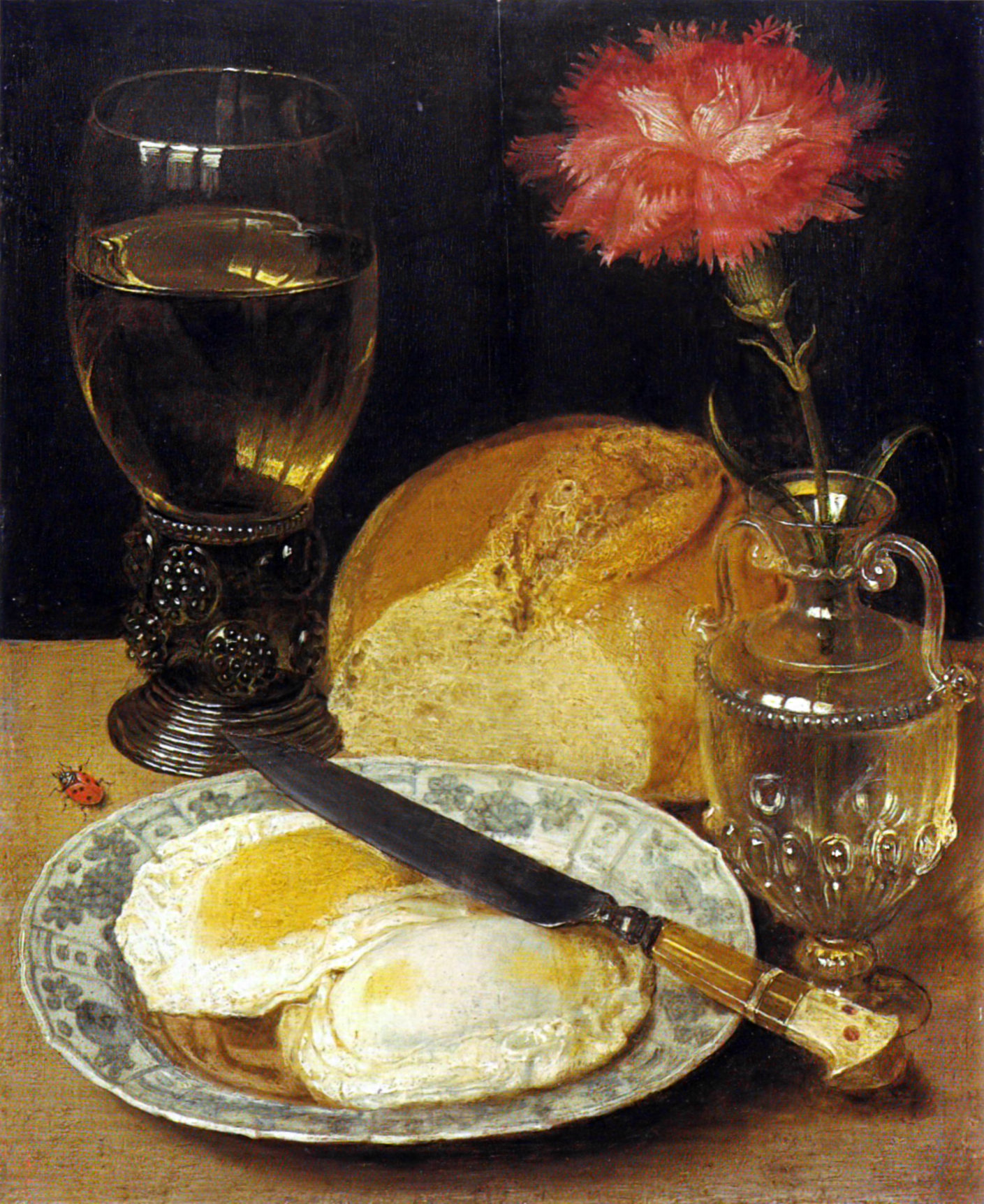
Snack with Fried Eggs

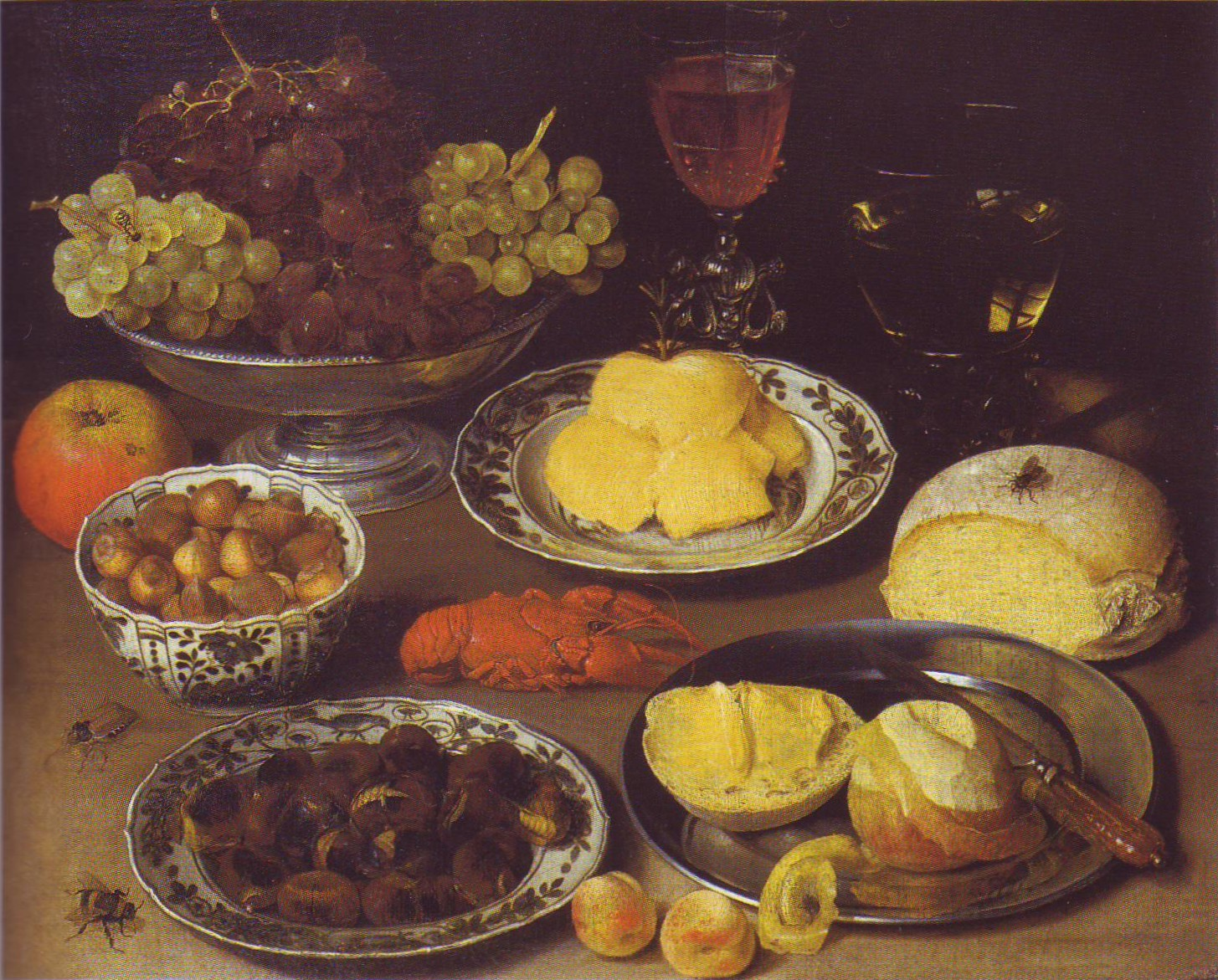
The Big Breakfast

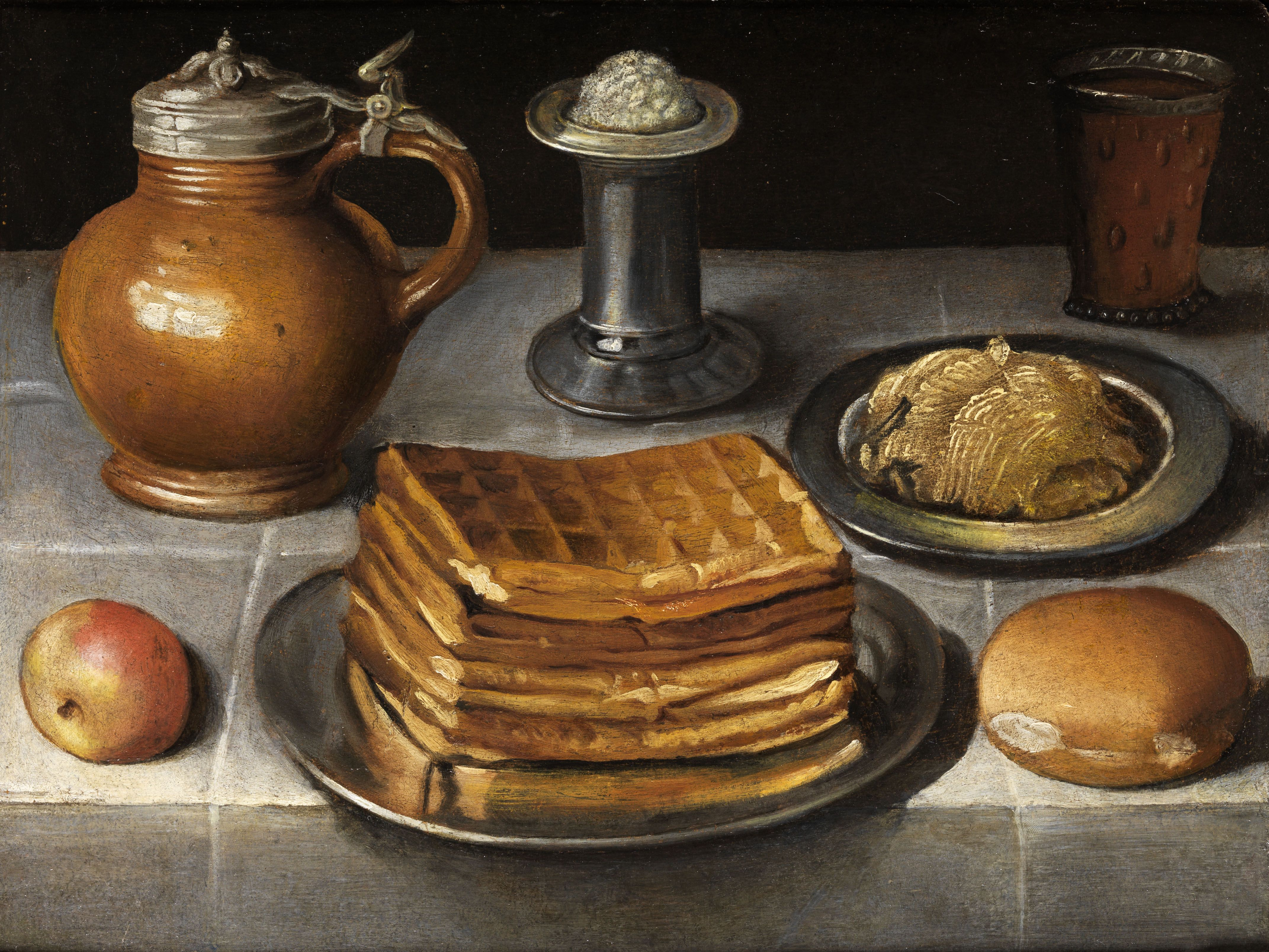
Still Life with Waffles

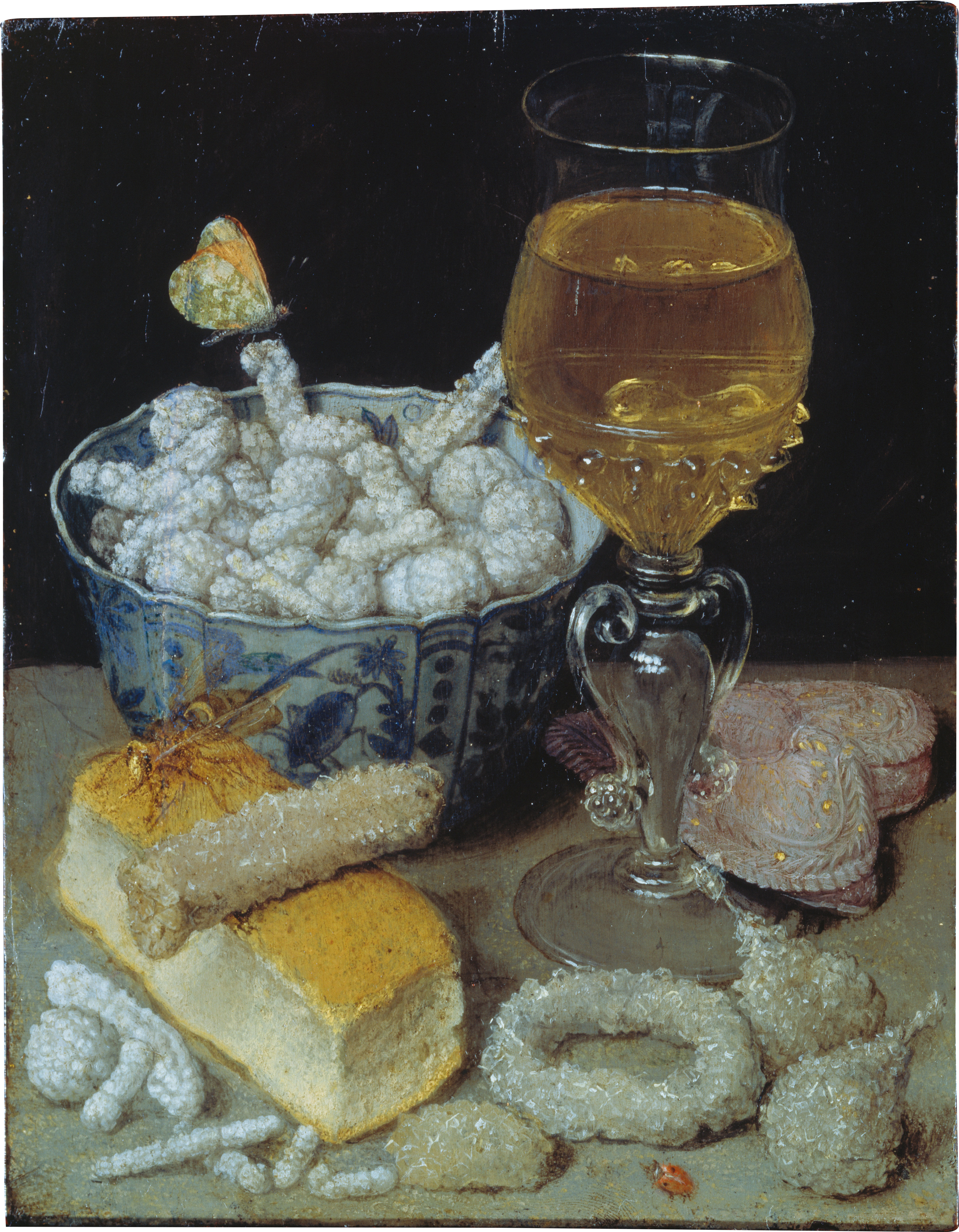
Still Life with Bread and Confectionery

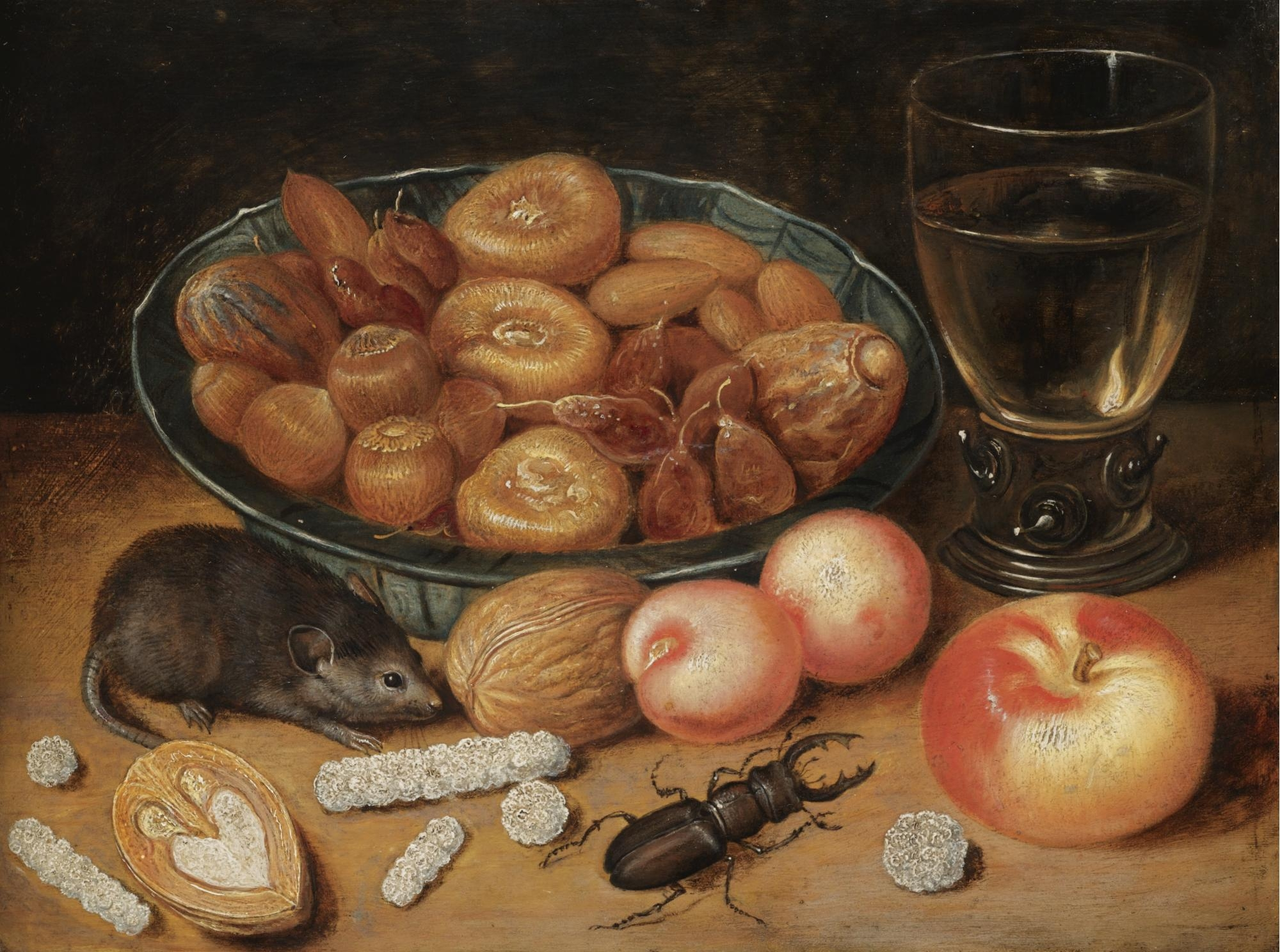
Still Life with Chestnuts and Hazelnuts

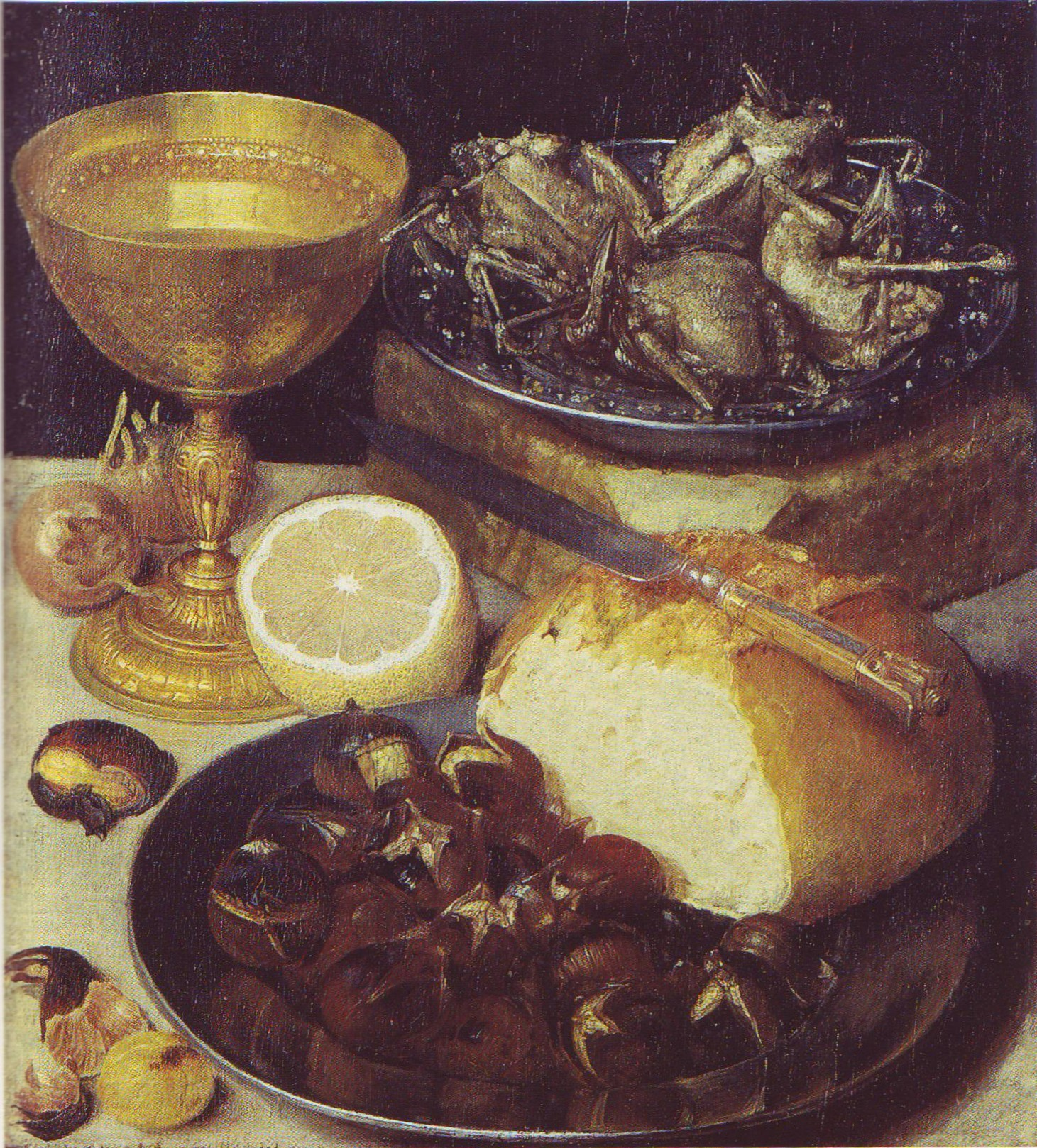
Small Birds and Roasted Chestnuts

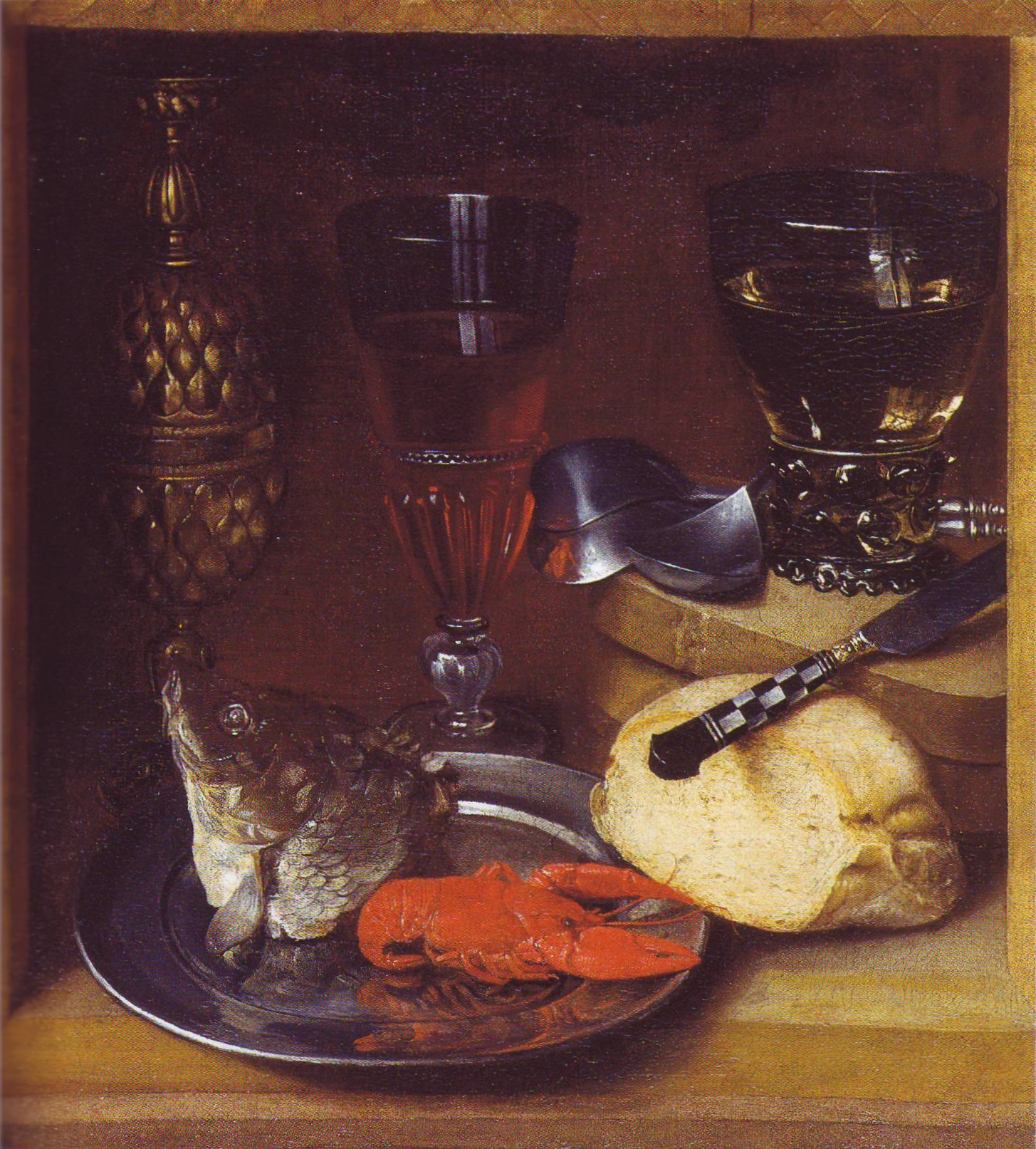
Still Life with Lobster

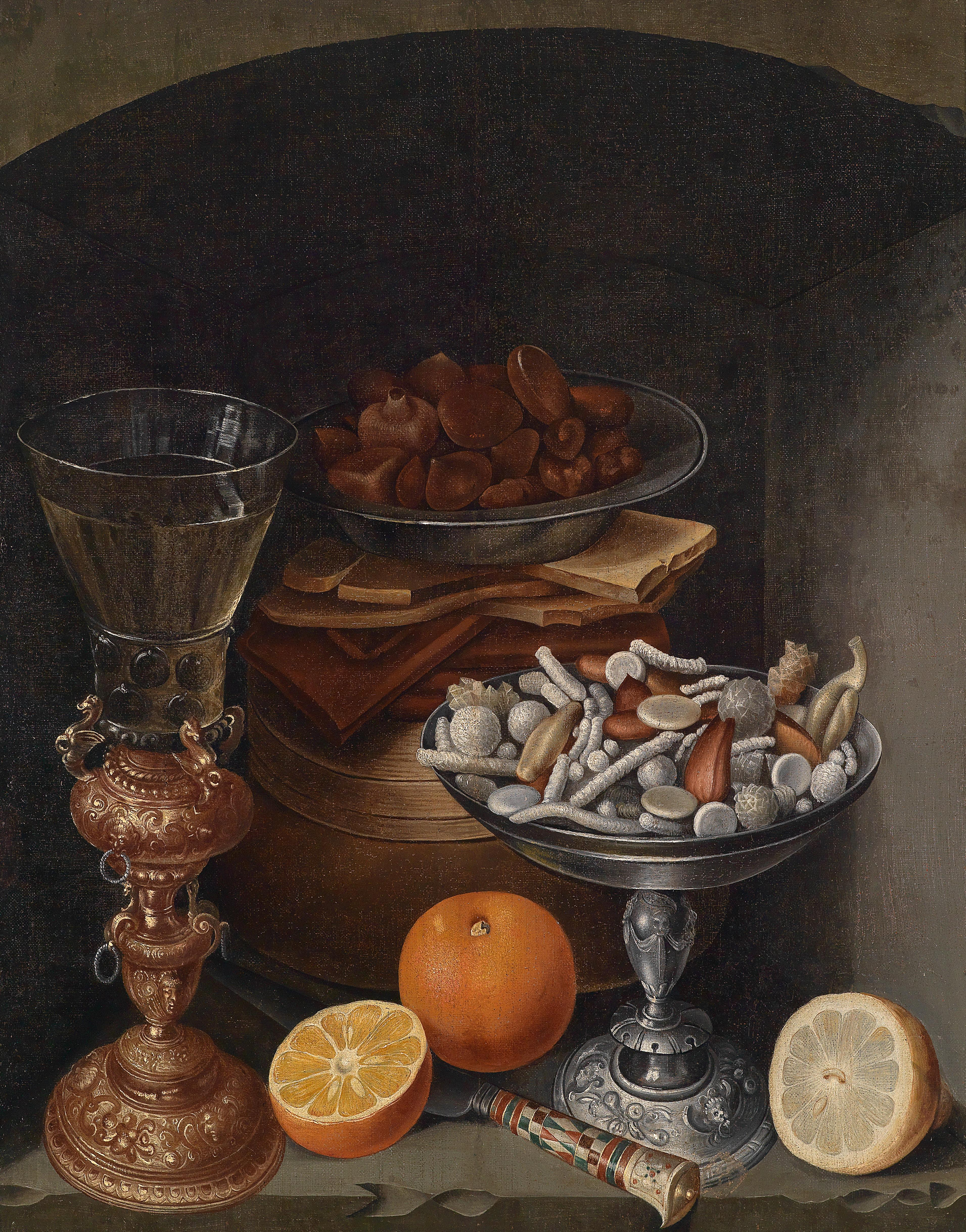
Still Life with Candy

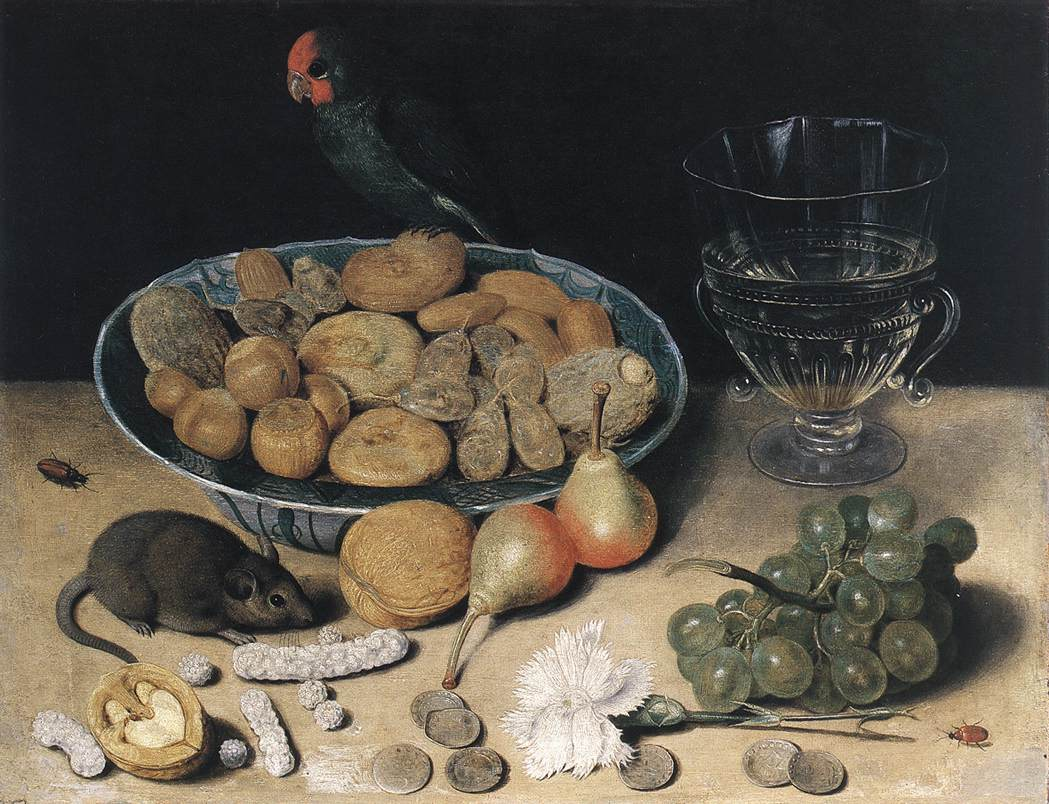
Dessert Still Life

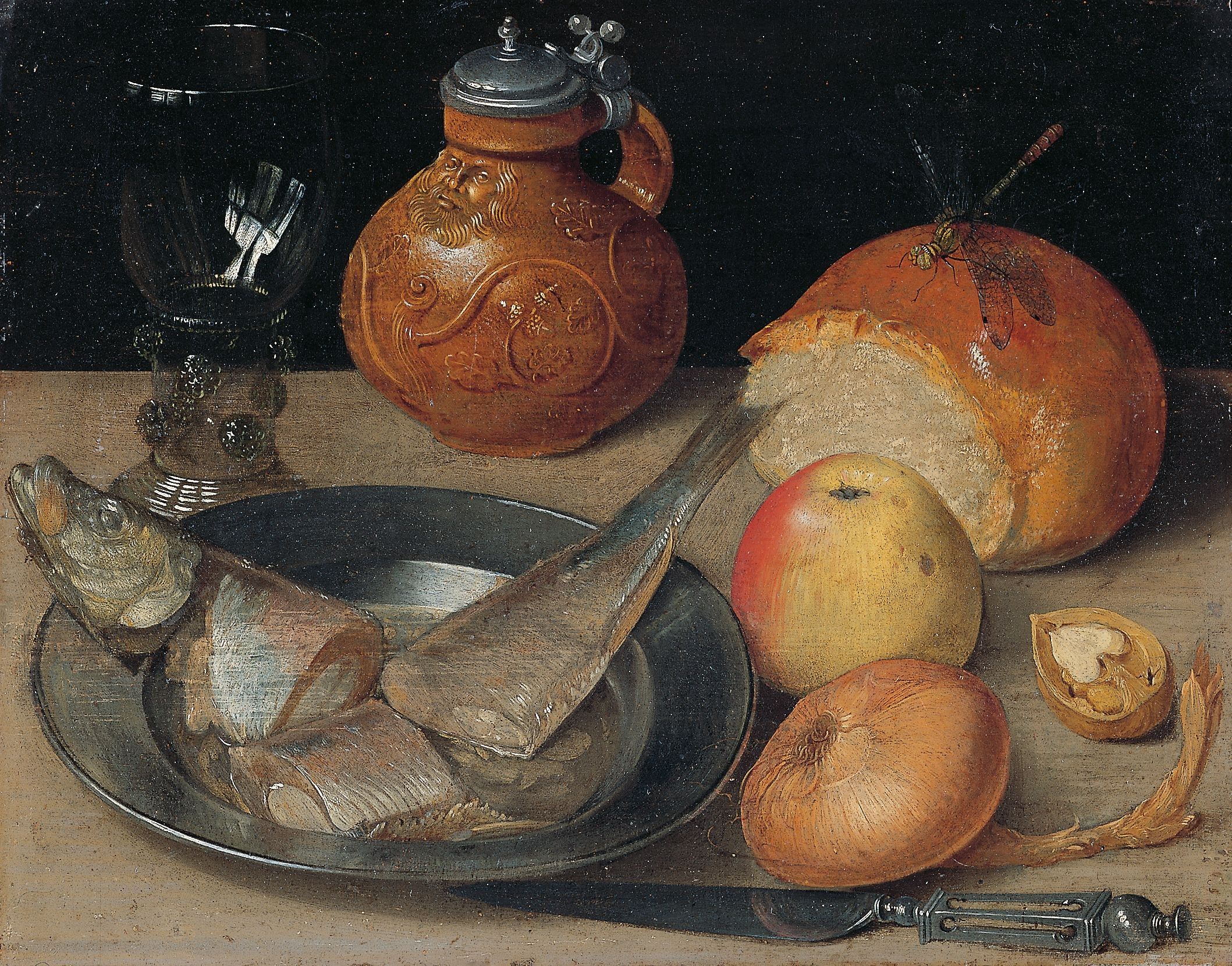
Still Life with Herring

== See also ==
- List of German painters
