= 1538 in art =

Events from the year 1538 in art.

== Works ==
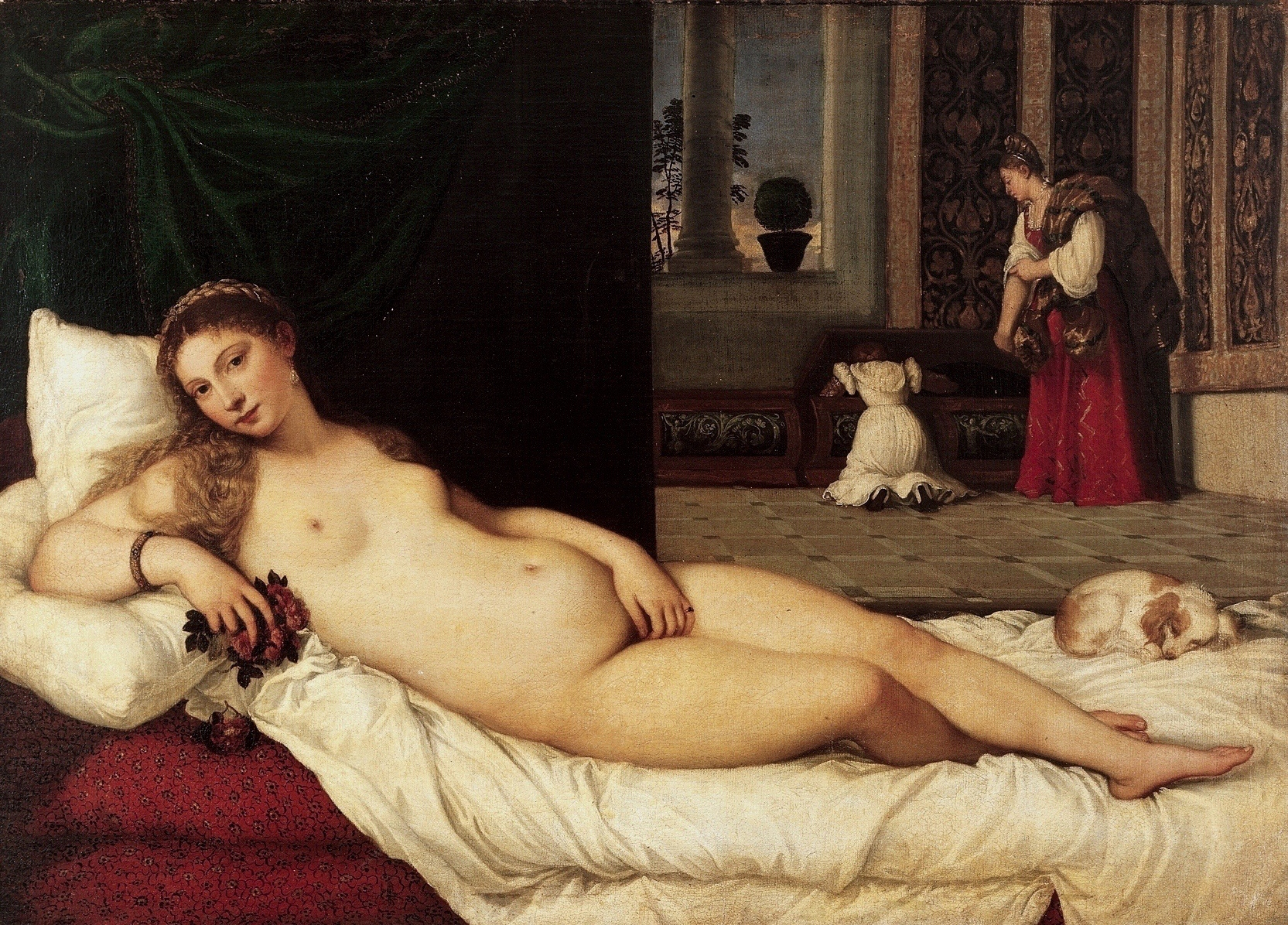
Titian – Venus of Urbino

- Hans Baldung – Ambrosius Volmar Keller
- Jacopo Bassano – The Supper at Emmaus
- Hans Holbein the younger
  - Christina of Denmark
  - Prince Edward
- Michelangelo – Study for the Colonna Pieta
- Titian – Venus of Urbino

== Births ==
- Antonio Abondio, Italian sculptor, best known as a medallist and as the pioneer of the coloured wax relief portrait miniature (died 1591)
- Durante Alberti, Italian painter, member of family of artists (died 1613)
- Miguel Barroso, Spanish painter (died 1590)
- Benedetto Caliari, Italian painter (died 1598)
- Pablo de Céspedes, Spanish painter, poet, and architect (died 1608)
- Francesco Curia, Italian Renaissance painter (died 1610)
- Hernando de Ávila, Spanish painter and sculptor (died 1595)

== Deaths ==
- Hans Dürer, German Renaissance painter, illustrator, and engraver (born 1490)
- Albrecht Altdorfer, German painter, pioneer of landscape in art (born 1480)
- Giorgio Gandini del Grano, Italian painter of the Parmesan school of Painting (b. unknown)
- Zhang Lu, Chinese landscape painter during the Ming Dynasty (born 1464)
