= Standing Saint =

Painting by Hans Baldung

- Saint Matthias
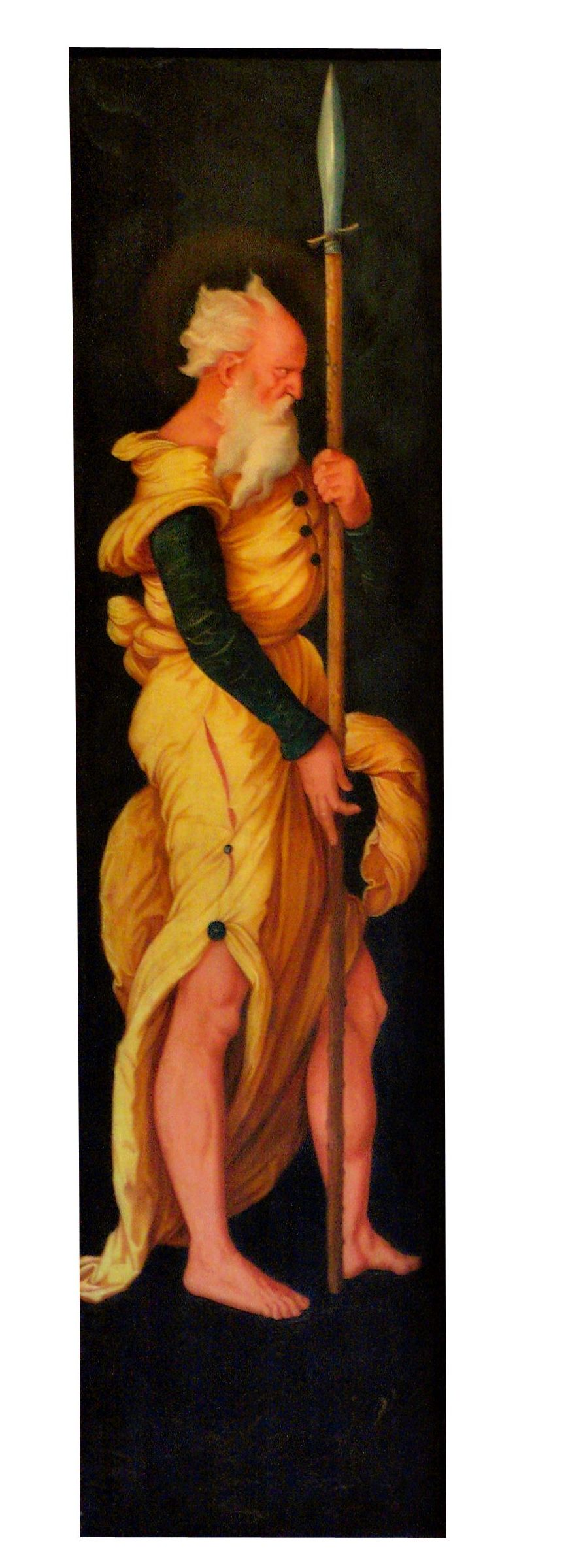
- Artist: Hans Baldung
- Year: circa 1528–1530
- Medium: oil painting on panel (lime)
- Movement: Northern Renaissance; Mannerism; Christian art
- Subject: an unidentified male Christian Saint
- Dimensions: 129.8 cm × 33.7 cm (51.1 in × 13.3 in)
- Location: Musée de l'Œuvre Notre-Dame, Strasbourg

The Standing Saint is a circa 1528–1530 oil painting on panel by the German painter Hans Baldung. It is on display in the Musée de l'Œuvre Notre-Dame, with its pendant, Saint George. Its inventory number is MBA 2130.a ("MBA" stands for Musée des Beaux-Arts).

The identity of the depicted Christian Saint is uncertain. Because of his lance, he is sometimes referred to as "Saint Matthias" or, less often, as "Saint Thomas". His energetic head strongly resembles the man's from Das ungleiche Liebespaar ("The unequal Lovers"), a 1528 painting now in the Staatliche Kunsthalle Karlsruhe.

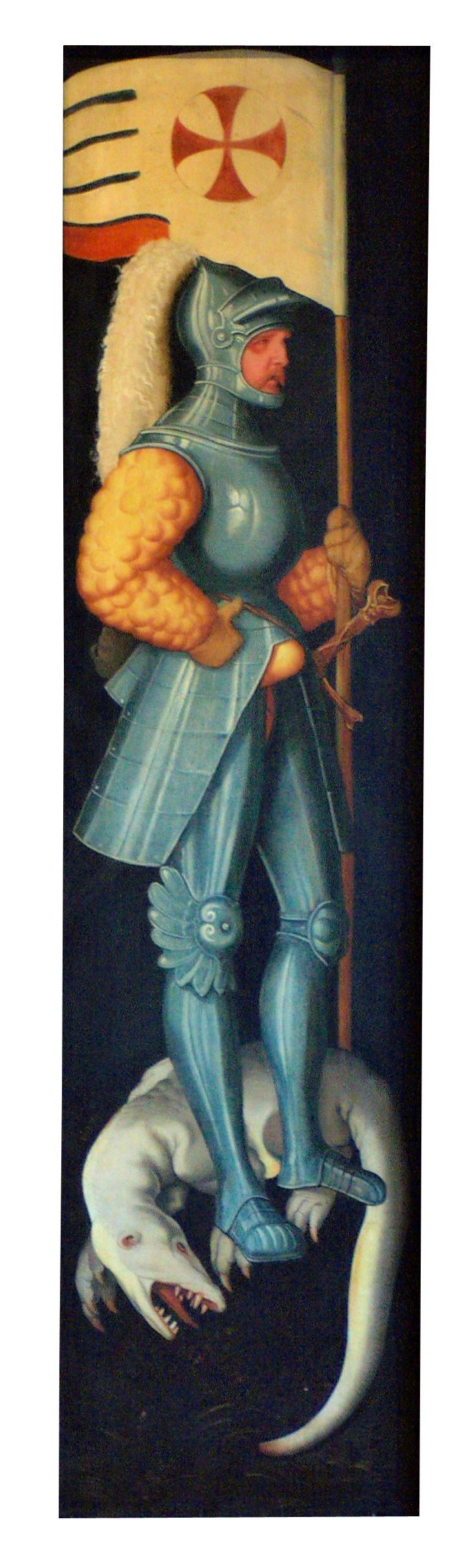
The painting's pendant, Saint George

The Standing Saint′s pendant in the Strasbourg museum is a Saint George (MBA 2130.b), which is considered a weaker work from the anatomical standpoint and probably in part the work of an assistant. Both paintings were probably the wings of a dismembered and unidentified altarpiece. The Standing Saint is representative for Baldung's blend of International Gothic and Italian Renaissance and an early example of his own brand of Mannerism.
