= Stoning of Saint Stephen (Baldung) =

Painting by Hans Baldung

The Stoning of Saint Stephen
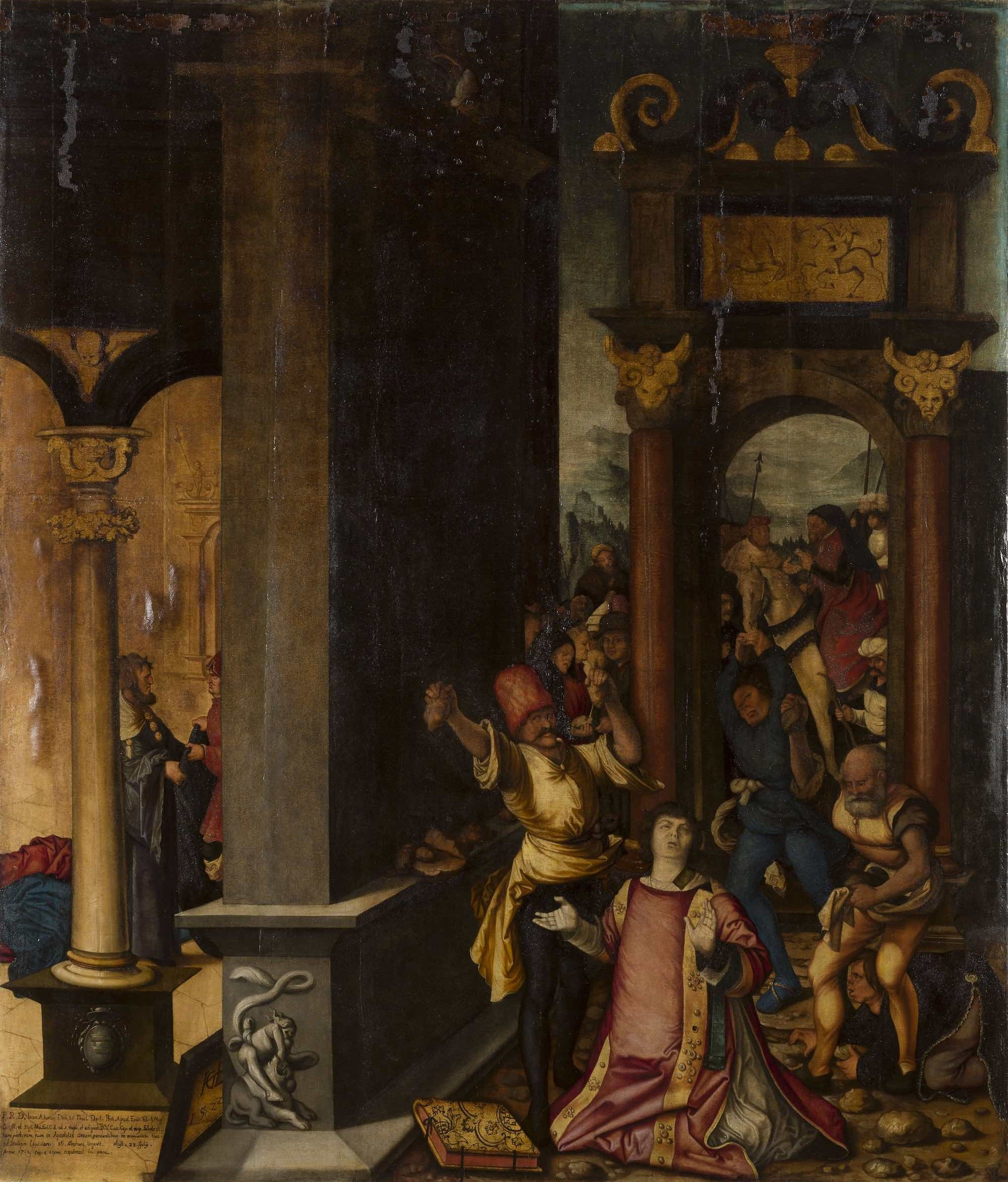
- Artist: Hans Baldung
- Year: 1522
- Medium: oil painting on canvas
- Movement: Northern Renaissance; Religious art
- Subject: Stoning of Saint Stephen
- Dimensions: 175 cm × 148 cm (69 in × 58 in)
- Location: Musée de l'Œuvre Notre-Dame, Strasbourg
- Owner: Musée des Beaux-Arts de Strasbourg
- Accession: 1896

The Stoning of Saint Stephen is a 1522 painting by the German Renaissance artist Hans Baldung. It is on display in the Musée de l'Œuvre Notre-Dame. Its inventory number is MBA 315 ("MBA" stands for Musée des Beaux-Arts).

The painting had been badly damaged by the fire that broke out on 13 August 1947 in the Palais Rohan, reducing some works to ashes and disfiguring others through the intense heat and smoke. It was finally restored starting in 2021, and presented again to the public in 2022, 500 years after its creation and 75 years after its near-destruction. The painting is notable for its origin, having been commissioned by Cardinal Albert of Brandenburg, and for the presence of a self-portrait of the artist, sporting a moustache

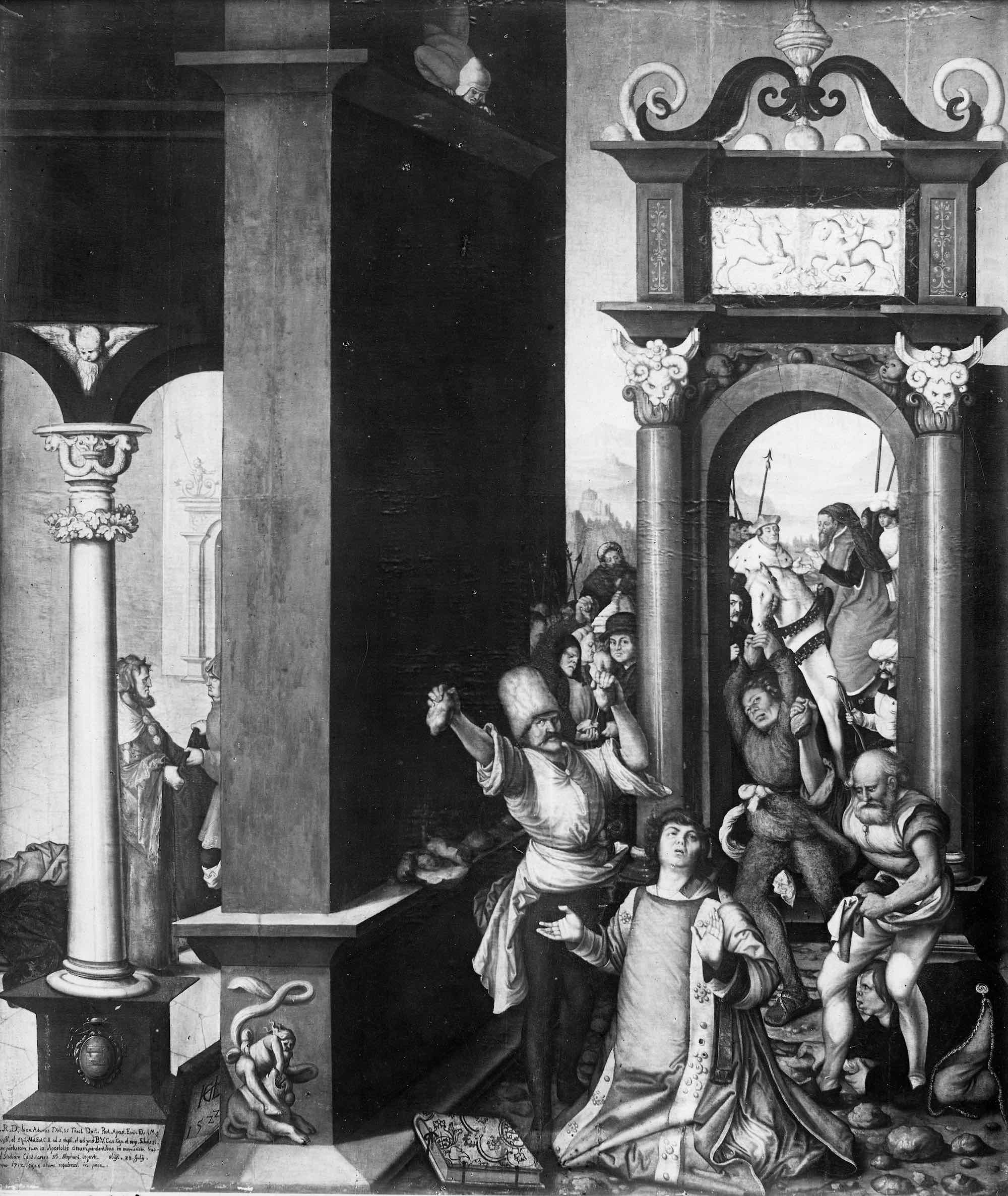
Ancient photo of the painting, before the 1947 fire

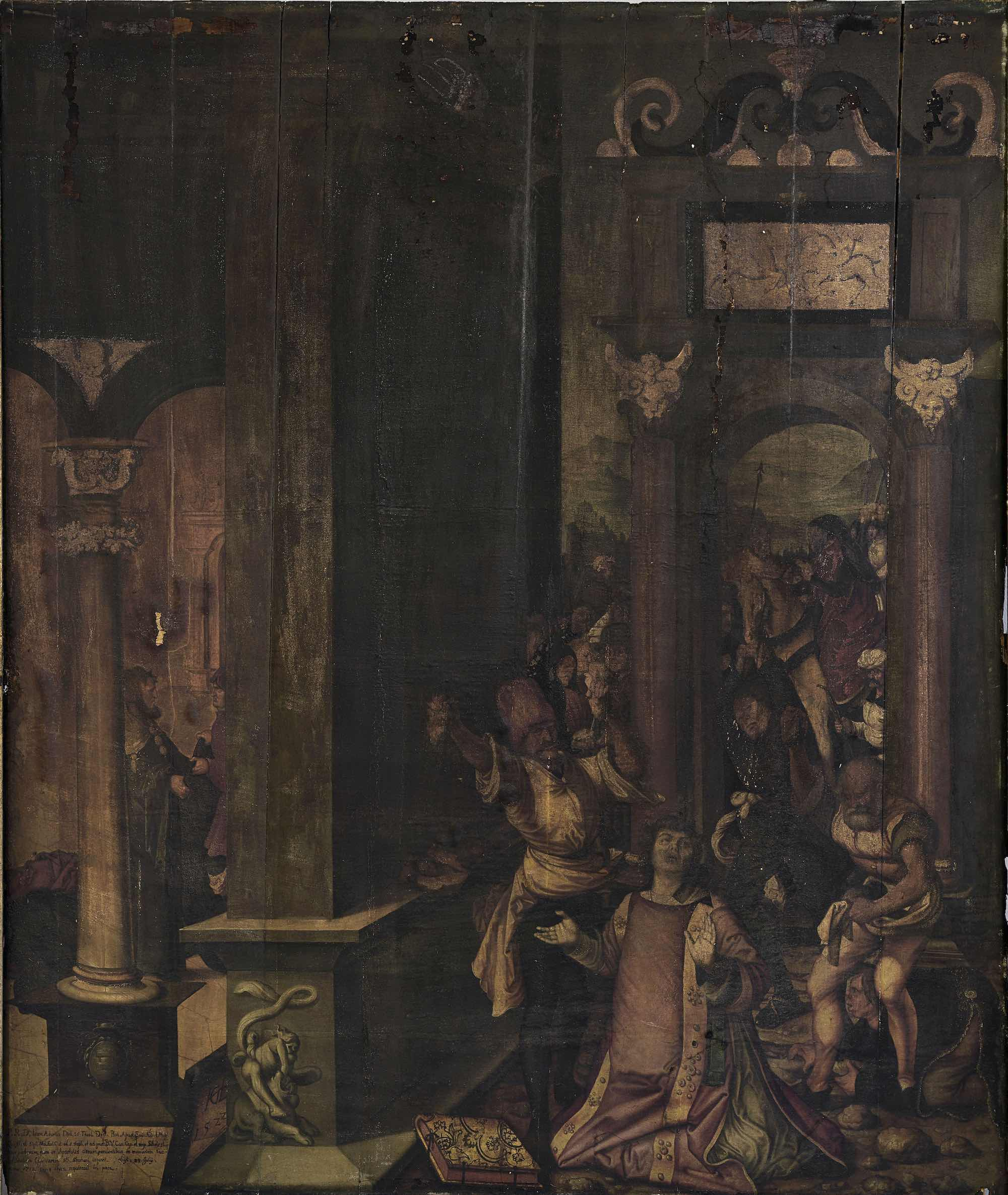
The painting in 2019, before the start of the restoration

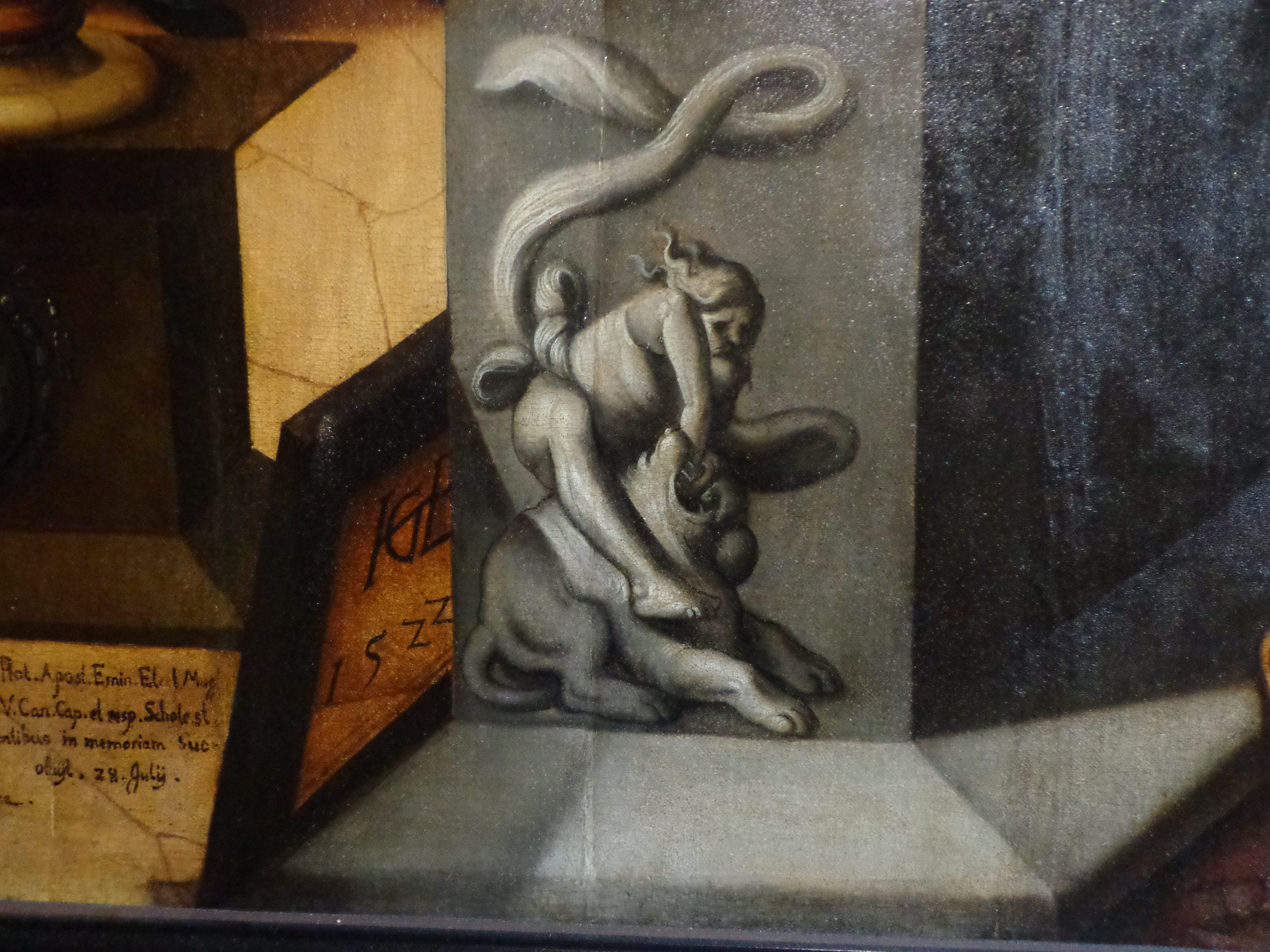
Baldung's signature

The self-portrait (very small resolution)
