= Madonna in the Vine Arbour =

Painting by Hans Baldung

- Maria in der Weinlaube (German), Vierge à la treille (French)
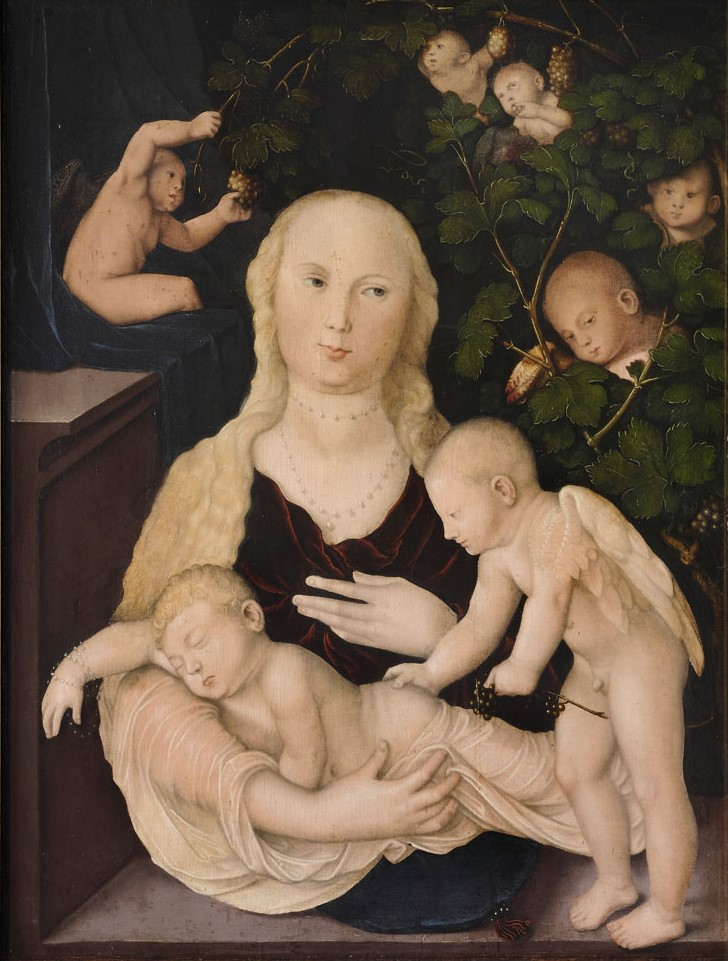
- Artist: Hans Baldung
- Year: circa 1541–1543
- Medium: oil painting on panel (lime)
- Movement: Northern Renaissance; Mannerism; Christian art
- Subject: Madonna surrounded by angels in a vine arbour
- Dimensions: 59 cm × 44 cm (23 in × 17 in)
- Location: Musée de l'Œuvre Notre-Dame, Strasbourg
- Accession: 1890s

Madonna in the Vine Arbour is a circa 1541–1543 unsigned painting by the German artist Hans Baldung. It is on display in the Musée de l'Œuvre Notre-Dame. Its inventory number is MBA 536 ("MBA" stands for Musée des Beaux-Arts).

It is the last of Baldung's depictions of the Virgin and Child and displays characteristic features of the painter's own brand of mannerism, such as strong contrasts between pale skins and dark backgrounds, and the combination of natural gestures and artificial poses. The painting may have been commissioned by a Protestant patron, which would account for the modesty (both in size and in clothing) of the figure of Mary. By contrast, slightly earlier Baldung works of the same type (such as the Nuremberg version, or the Berlin version) had depicted Mary as a dominant, sensuous semi-nude.
