= Ambrosius Volmar Keller (Baldung) =

Painting by Hans Baldung

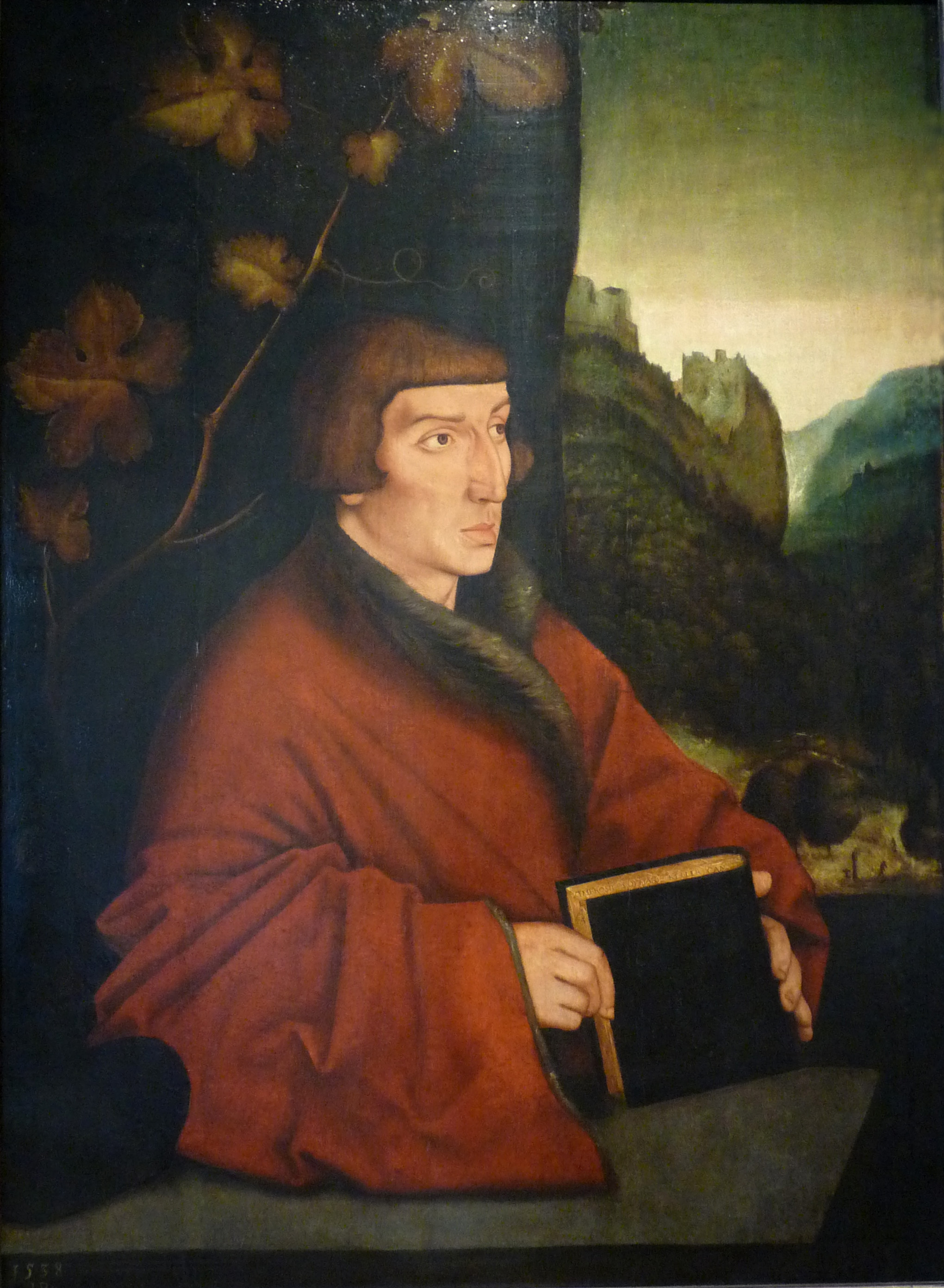
- Artist: Hans Baldung
- Year: 1538
- Medium: oil painting on panel (lime)
- Movement: Northern Renaissance; Portrait painting
- Subject: Canon Ambrosius Volmar Keller
- Dimensions: 98 cm × 72 cm (39 in × 28 in)
- Location: Musée de l'Œuvre Notre-Dame, Strasbourg
- Accession: 1890

Ambrosius Volmar Keller is a 1538 portrait painting by the German Renaissance artist Hans Baldung. The painting was offered to the city of Strasbourg by German Emperor Wilhelm II, from his private collection, in 1890. It is on display in the Musée de l'Œuvre Notre-Dame. Its inventory number is MBA 191 ("MBA" stands for Musée des Beaux-Arts).

Ambrosius Volmar Keller was the nephew of the prior of Saint-Pierre-le-Jeune Church, at a time when that church still entirely belonged to the Catholic Church, and had just been made canon; he would himself become prior of Saint-Pierre-le-Jeune in 1558. The solemn portrait celebrates the young Keller's gravitas and new social status.

Ambrosius Volmar Keller is Baldung's largest and last portrait painting, and the only one in which he used a landscape as a background. The symbolism of the conspicuous grapevine growing behind Keller's back has not been entirely explained, it could be related to Christianity or to Northern European Renaissance humanism. The fact that Keller is sitting on the left and looking to the right suggests that the portrait may have had a lost pendant, maybe a portrait of the elder Keller. The donation of the painting to the Strasbourg museum by Emperor Wilhelm II constituted an important gesture in the early stages of the reconstruction of the municipal collections, which had been totally destroyed in 1870, during the Siege of Strasbourg.
