= Giorgio Gandini del Grano =

Italian painter

Giorgio Gandini del Grano (before 1489 – 1538) was an Italian painter of the Parma school of painting. He was selected in 1535 to complete the decoration of the apse of the Parma Cathedral. He was alleged to have been a pupil of Antonio da Correggio. His masterpiece is the St. Michael altar-piece now in the National Gallery at Parma.
