= Musée de l'Œuvre Notre-Dame =

Upper Rhenish art museum in Strasbourg, France

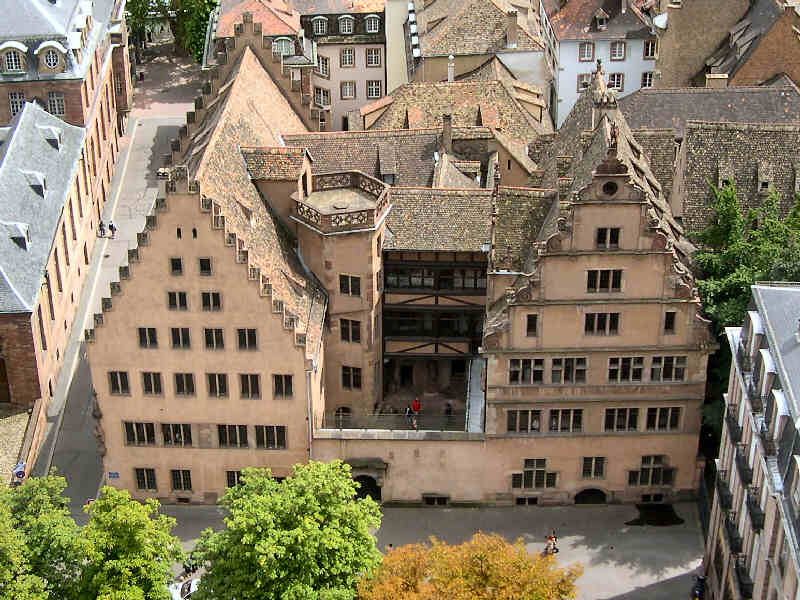
- The Musée de l'Œuvre Notre-Dame in the building of the Cathedral Foundation. Left wing built in 1347, right wing built in 1579

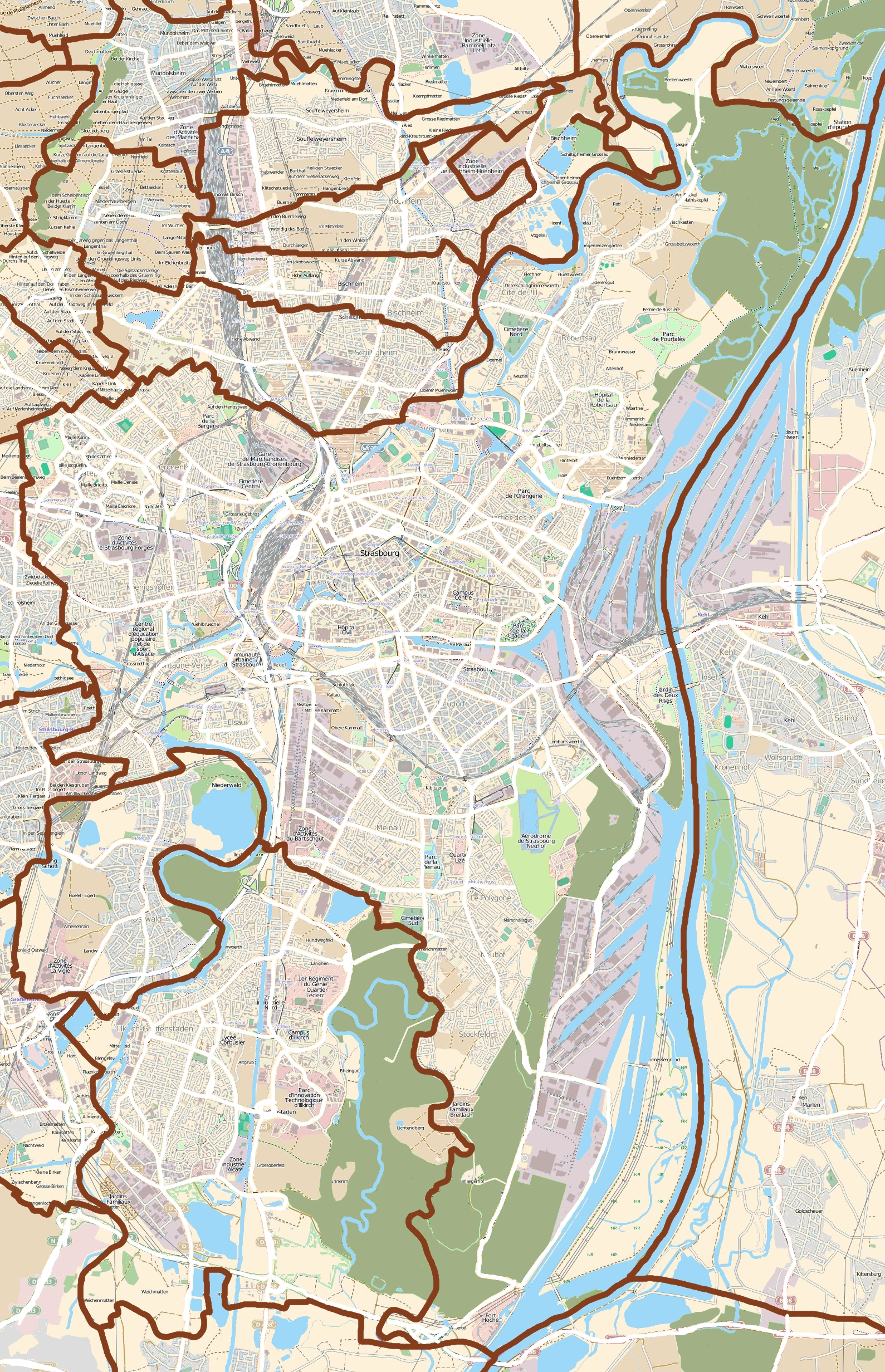
- Location within Strasbourg
- Location: Strasbourg, France
- Coordinates: 48.580833°N 7.751389°E
- Type: Fine arts Decorative arts
- Website: en.musees.strasbourg.eu/museum-uvre-notre-dame

The Musée de l'Œuvre Notre-Dame (or Frauenhausmuseum in German) is the city of Strasbourg's museum for Upper Rhenish fine arts and decorative arts, dating from the early Middle Ages until 1681. The museum is famous for its collection of original sculptures, glass windows, architectural fragments, as well as the building plans of Strasbourg Cathedral. It has a considerable collection of works by Peter Hemmel von Andlau, Niclas Gerhaert van Leyden, Nikolaus Hagenauer, Ivo Strigel, Konrad Witz, Hans Baldung and Sebastian Stoskopff.

== Purpose ==
The Musée de l’Œuvre Notre-Dame was created in order to merge, under a single roof, four thematically related but differently focussed, collections of all types of Upper Rhenish art created prior to 1681. It is located in the half-Gothic, half-Renaissance core building of the Fondation de l’Œuvre Notre-Dame, and in several early Baroque timber-framed houses which surround it.

== Origins ==
The first documentary evidence of the Strasbourg Fondation de l’Œuvre Notre-Dame, dates back to 1281, and it is still responsible for the maintenance of the cathedral. In addition to the building plans, which have been preserved from the very beginning, they also conserve architectural artifacts such as fragments of the choir screen, which was destroyed in 1681 and the originals of the sculptures which were removed or knocked down during the French Revolution and were later replaced by copies. The Société pour la conservation des monuments historiques d’Alsace (Society for the Conservation of the Historical Monuments of Alsace), endeavored to rescue the most valuable components and decorations (altars, statues, vessels, tapestries) from churches, cloisters and chapels which had been abandoned to destruction or decay throughout Alsace.

The painting collection of the city, restored by Wilhelm von Bode around 1890, exhibited a primary focus on regional masters, as noted by the donation of the "Portrait of the canon Ambrosius Volmar Keller", a masterpiece of Hans Baldung from the private collection of Wilhelm II.

== Museum ==
Finally, in the new museum of decorative arts of the city, the "Hohenlohe Museum", works of decorative art from the Middle Ages, Renaissance and Early Baroque were also exhibited. These collections, which had been housed in various locations, were united in 1931 in the newly founded Musée de l’Œuvre Notre-Dame.

In 1956, after the repair of the damage caused by the bombing of Strasbourg during the war in 1944, the museum was re-opened, featuring its expanded collection.

In addition to the cathedral sculptures, glass windows, etc., the collection also features valuable artifacts salvaged from other Strasbourg churches, such as the Temple Neuf, which was destroyed in 1870, the Saint-Pierre-le-Vieux Church, renovated in 1867, and the Église Sainte-Madeleine, destroyed by fire in 1904.

The romanesque components (cloister, baptismal font) from St Trophimus' Church, Eschau and the stained glass windows from St. Peter and St. Paul's Church, Wissembourg and Mutzig are noteworthy. Included in the collection are many late gothic altars assigned to anonymous masters of the Schongauer School.

== Gallery ==
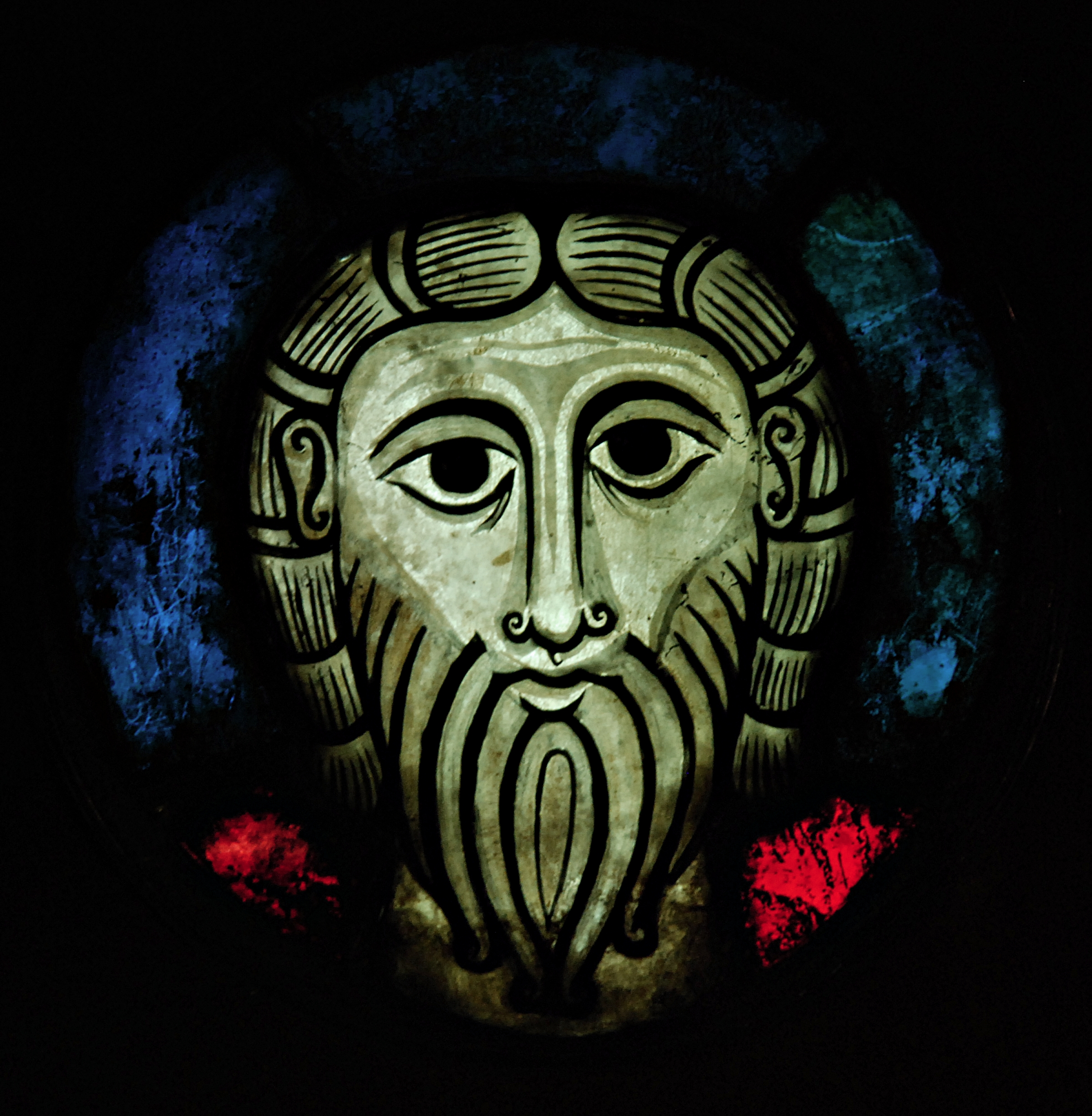
Romanesque stained glass window "Head of Christ" from Wissembourg (11th or 12th century)

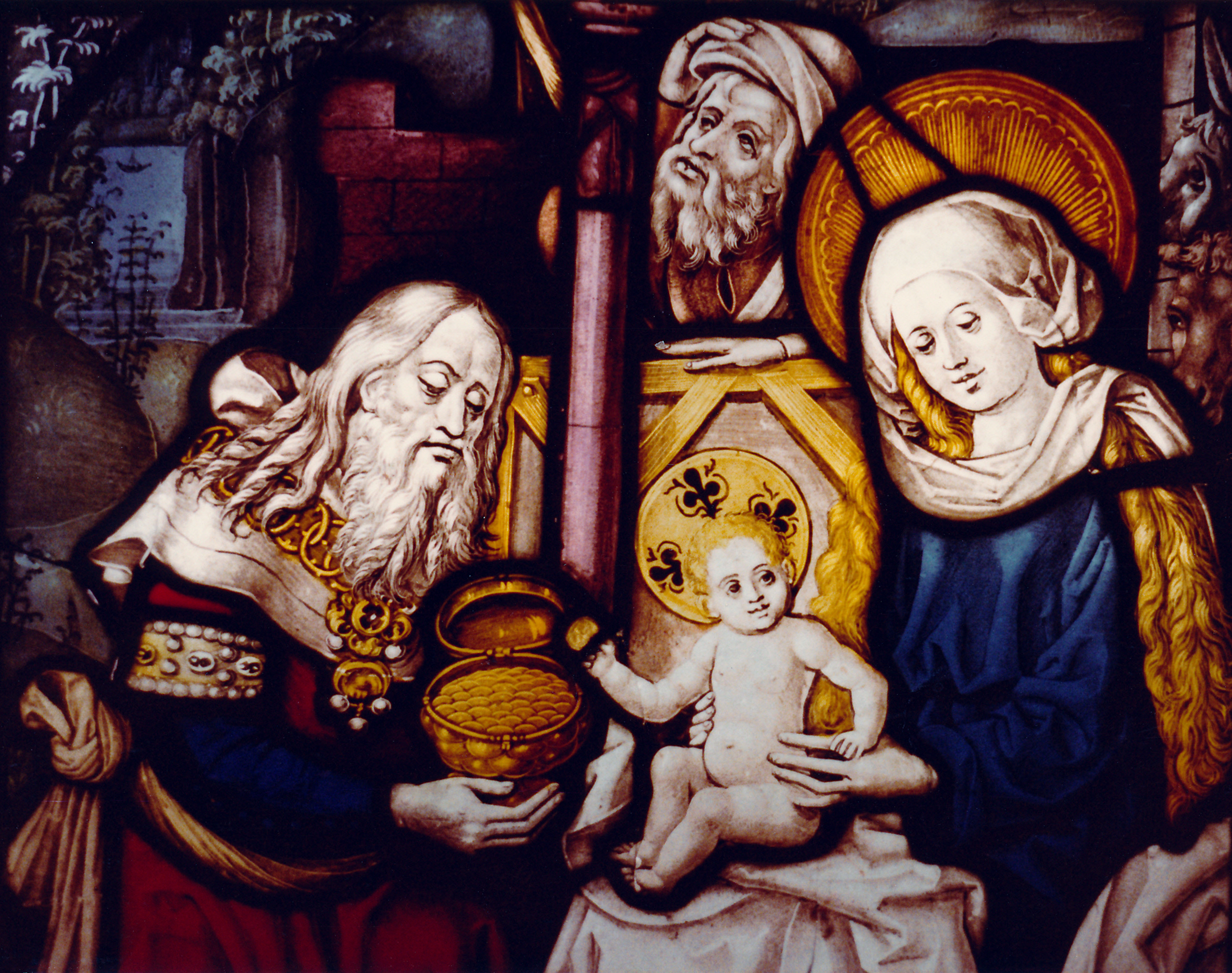
Gothic stained glass window depicting the Melchior Magi offering gold to the Infant Jesus, (± 1390) - From Old Saint Peter's Church.

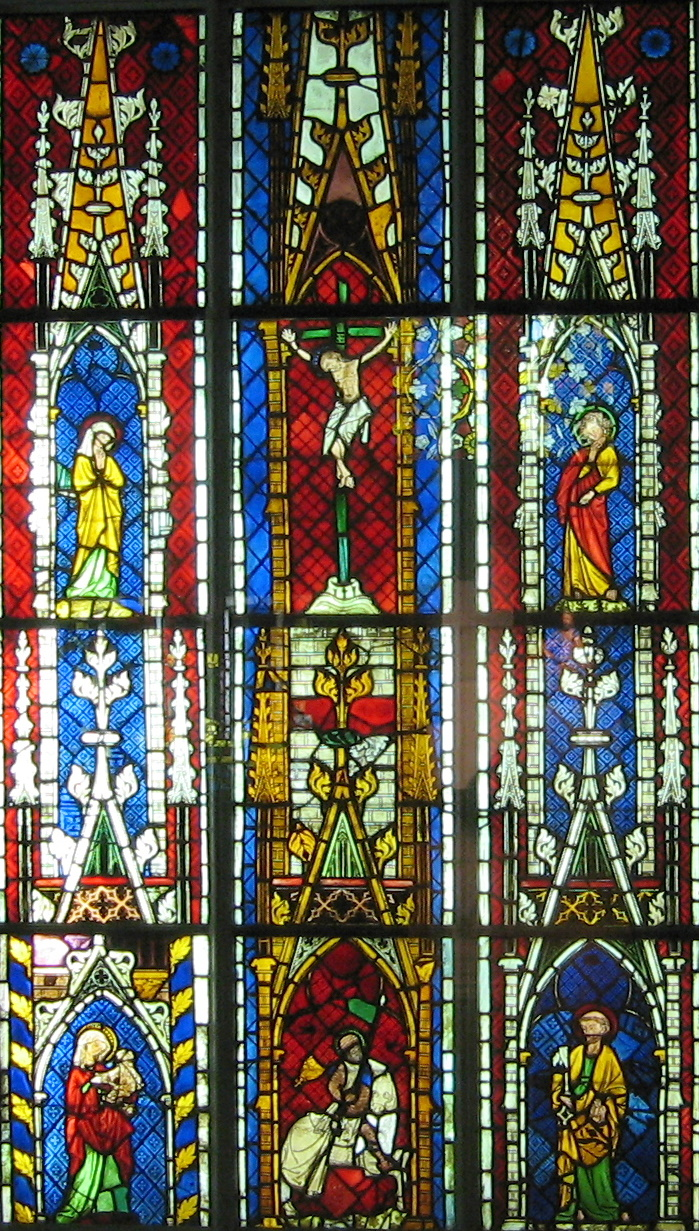
Gothic stained glass window "Calvary" from Mutzig (early 14th century)

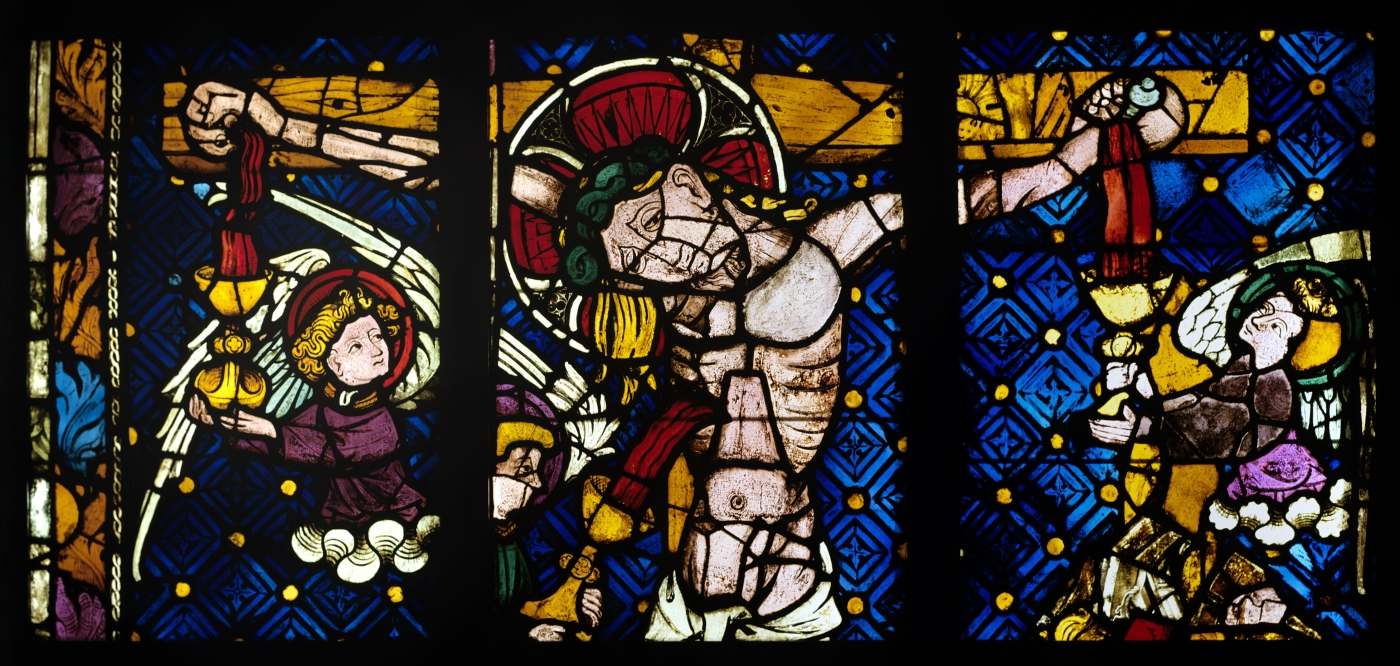
Gothic stained glass window "Christ on the Cross" from Strasbourg (early 15th century)

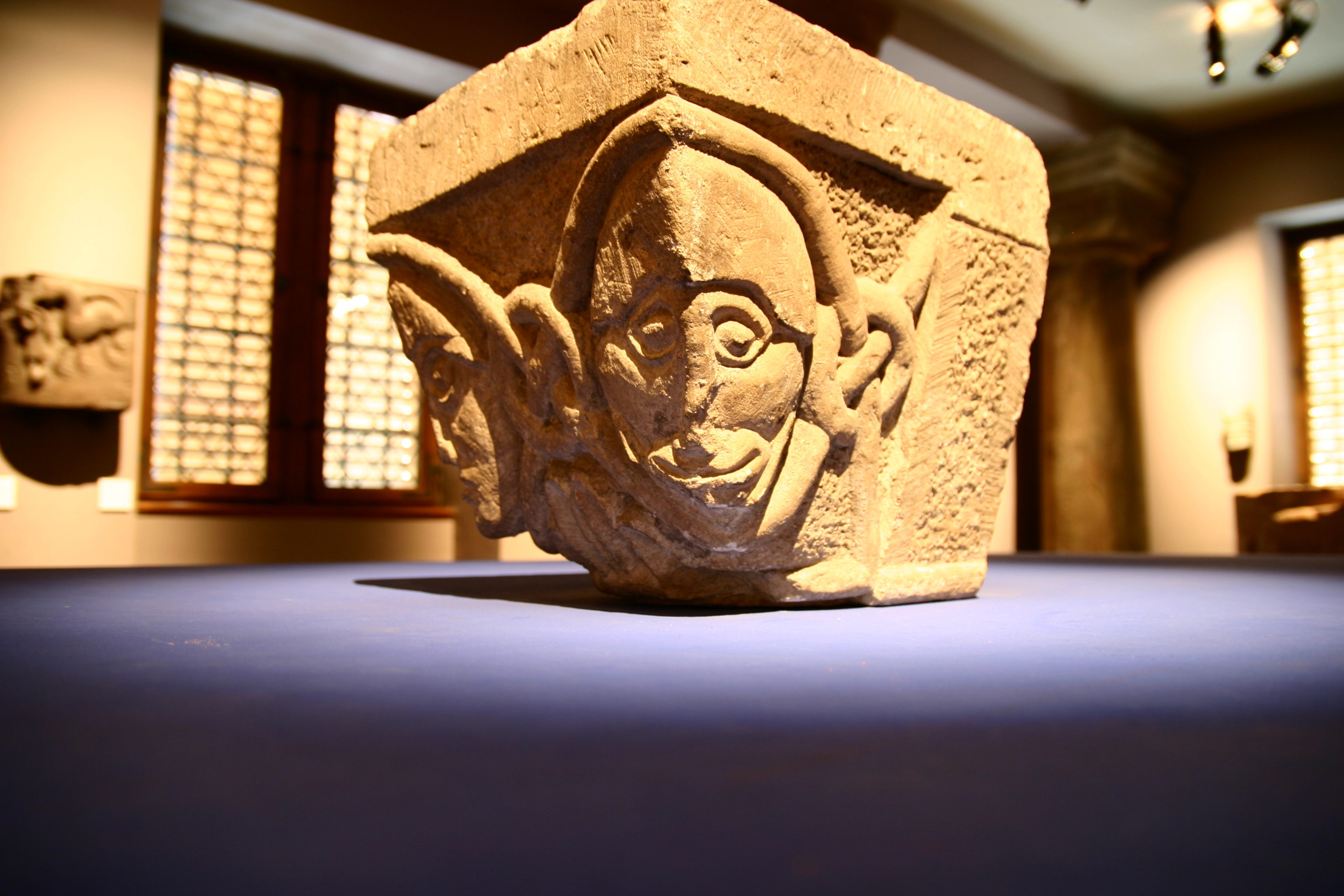
A romanesque relief capital on display at the museum

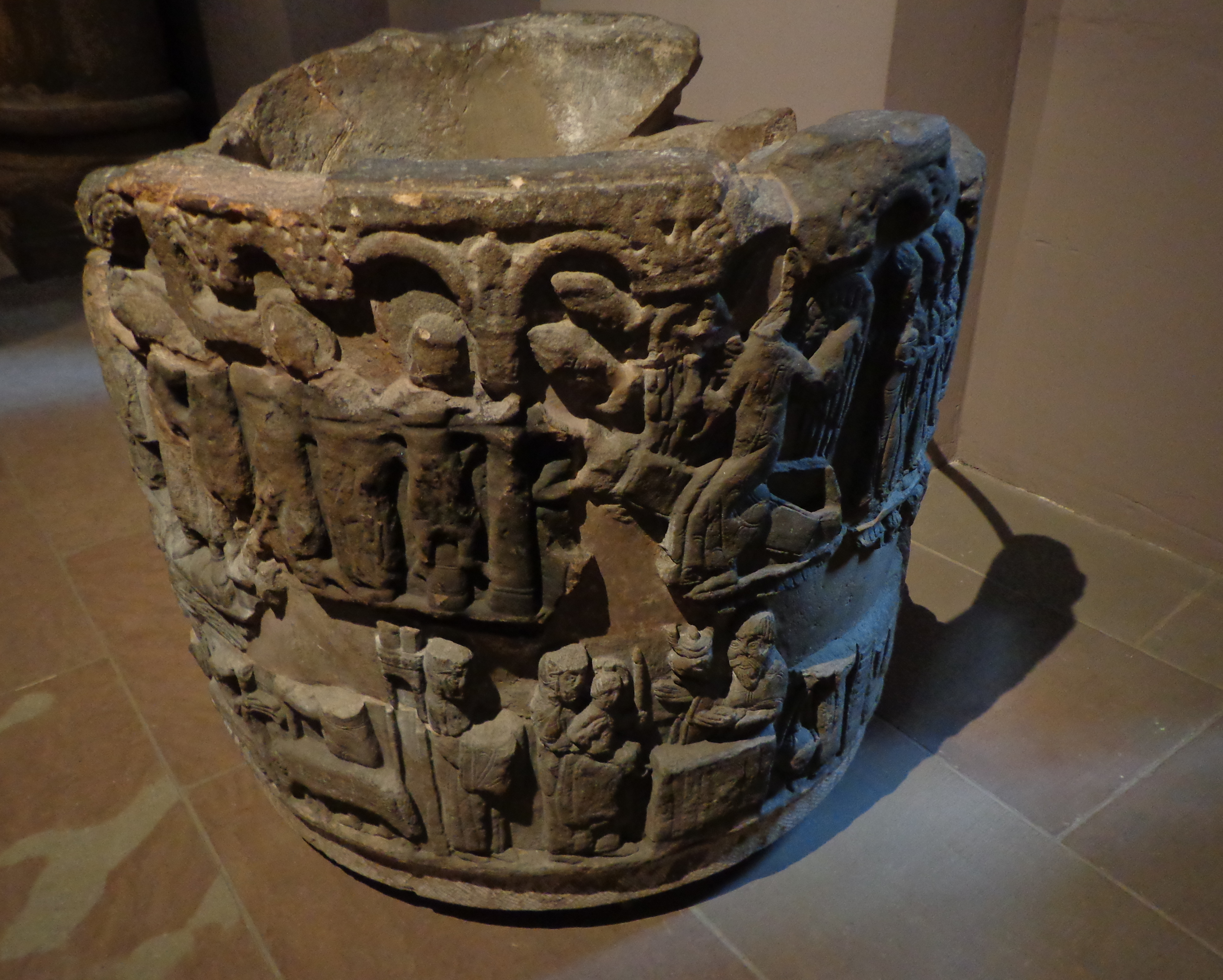
Romanesque baptismal font by the Master of Eschau

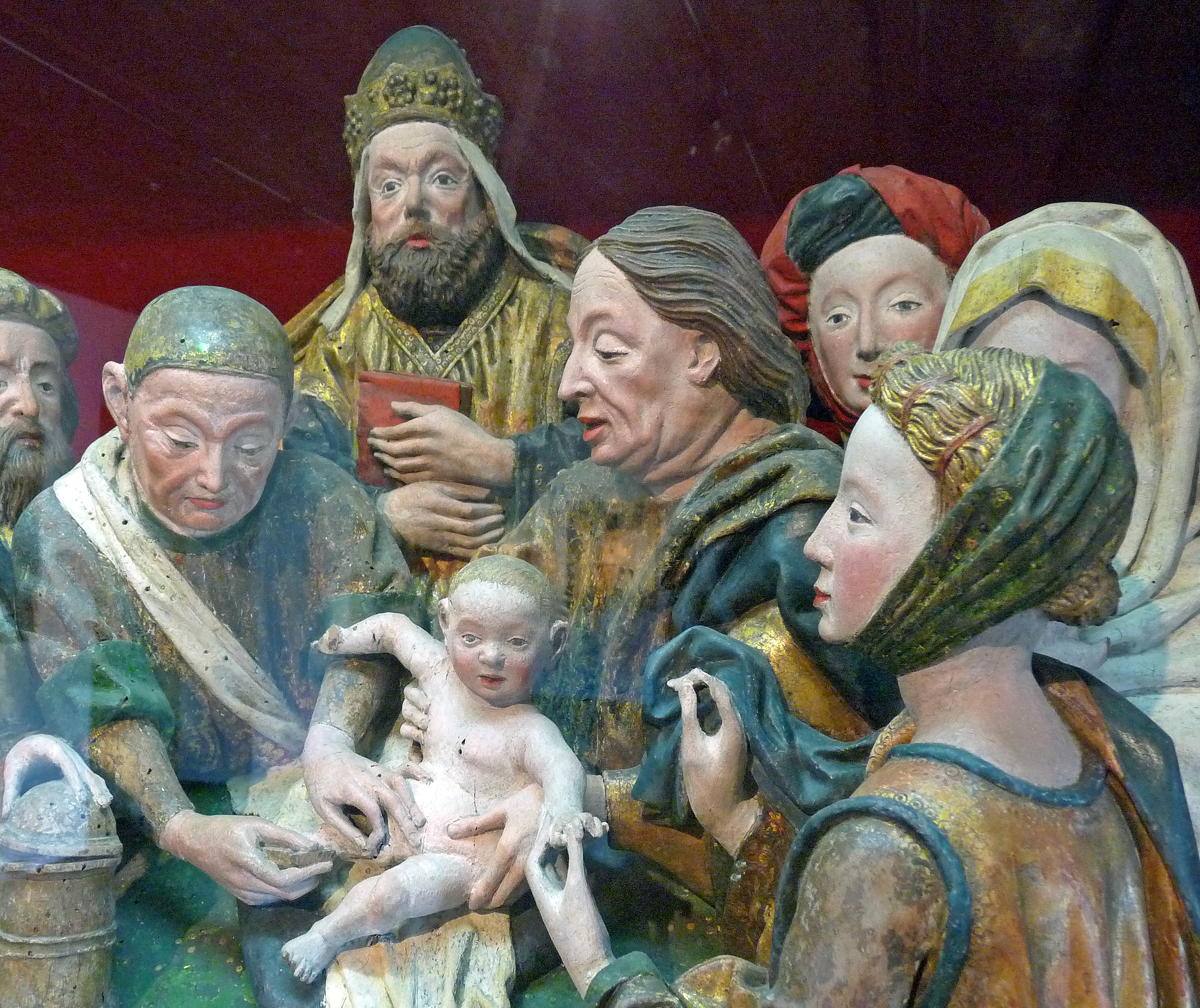
Gothic wooden relief "Circumcision of Christ", from Strasbourg (late 15th century)

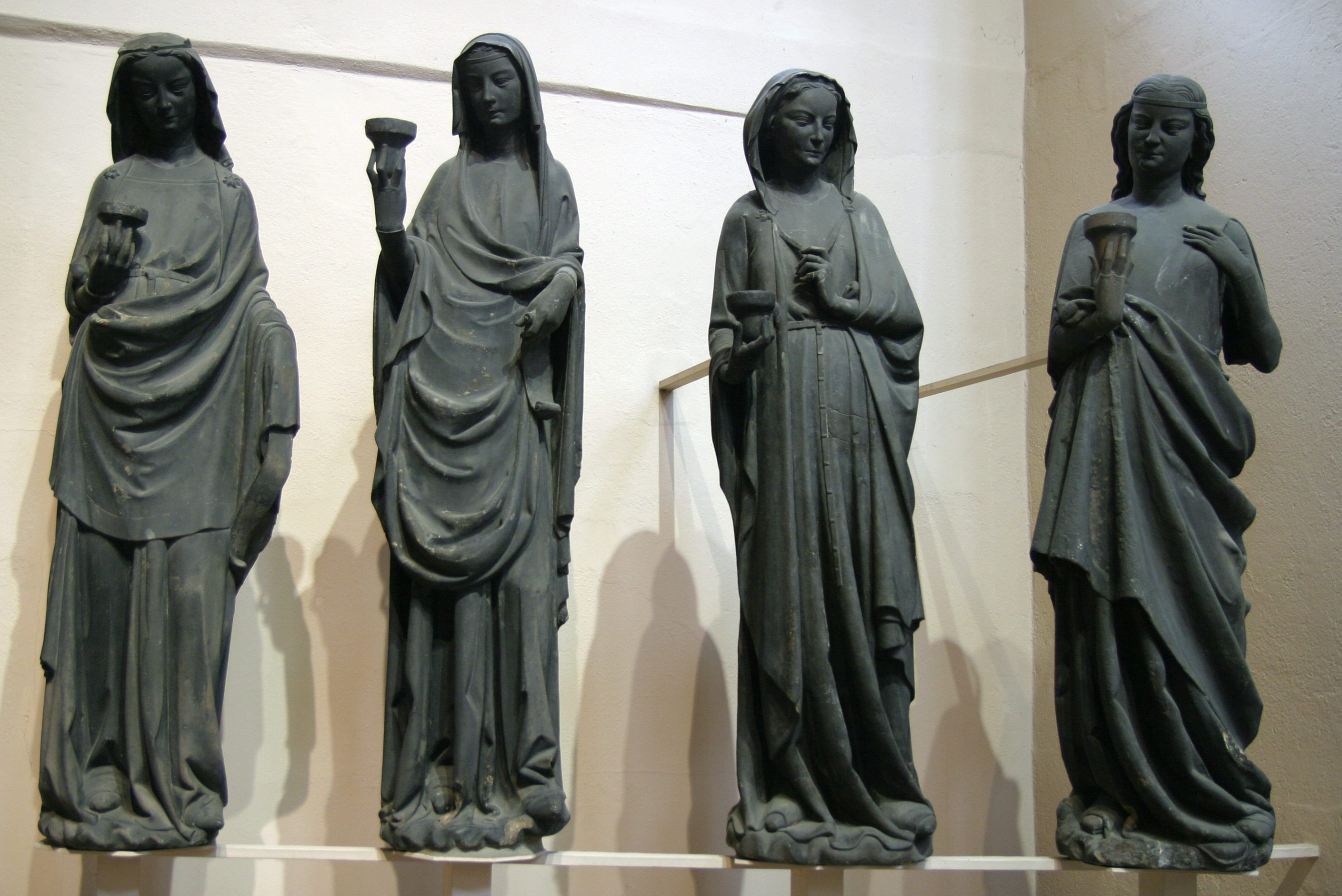
Statues from Notre-Dame de Strasbourg

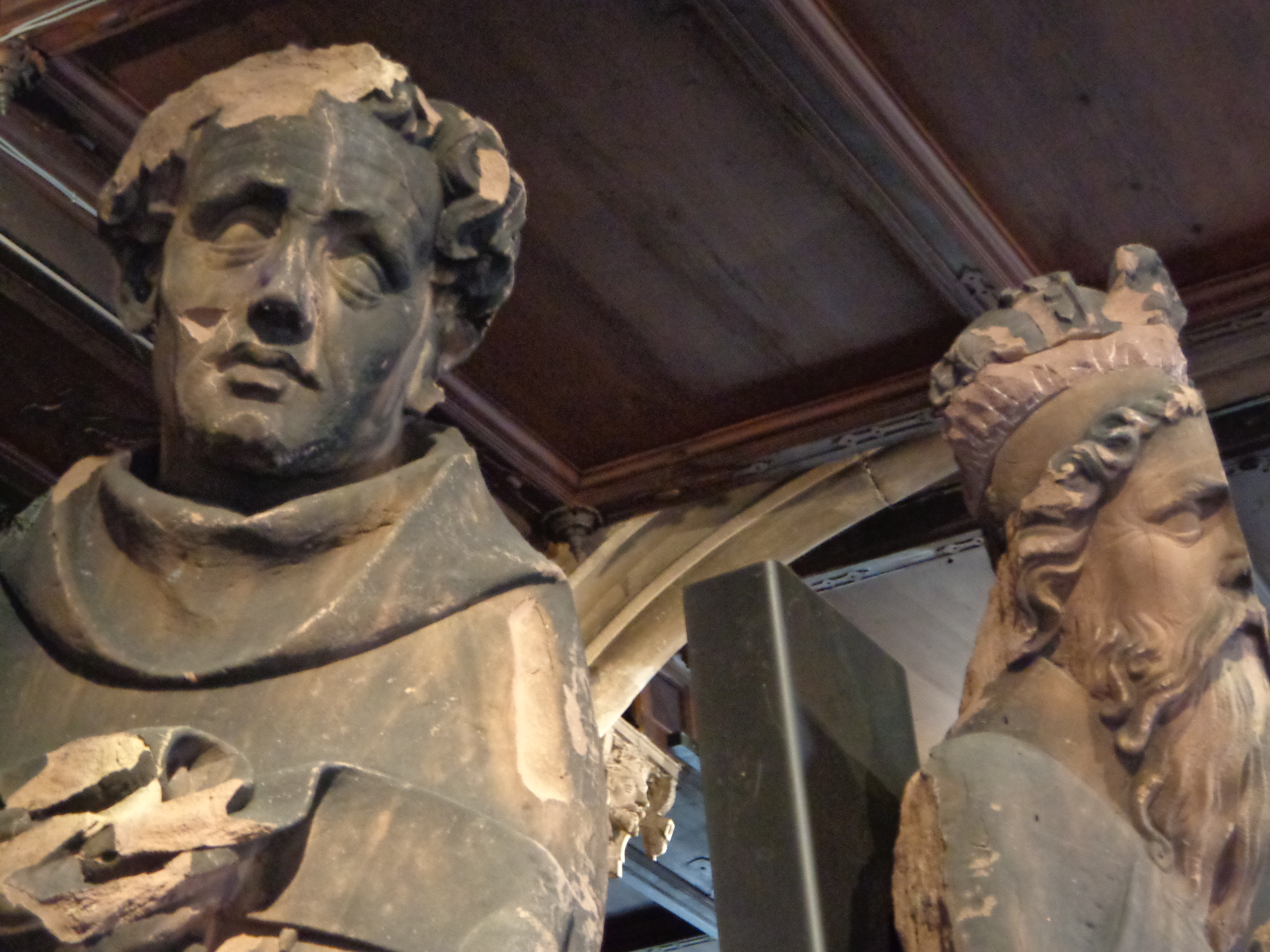
Statues from Notre-Dame de Strasbourg

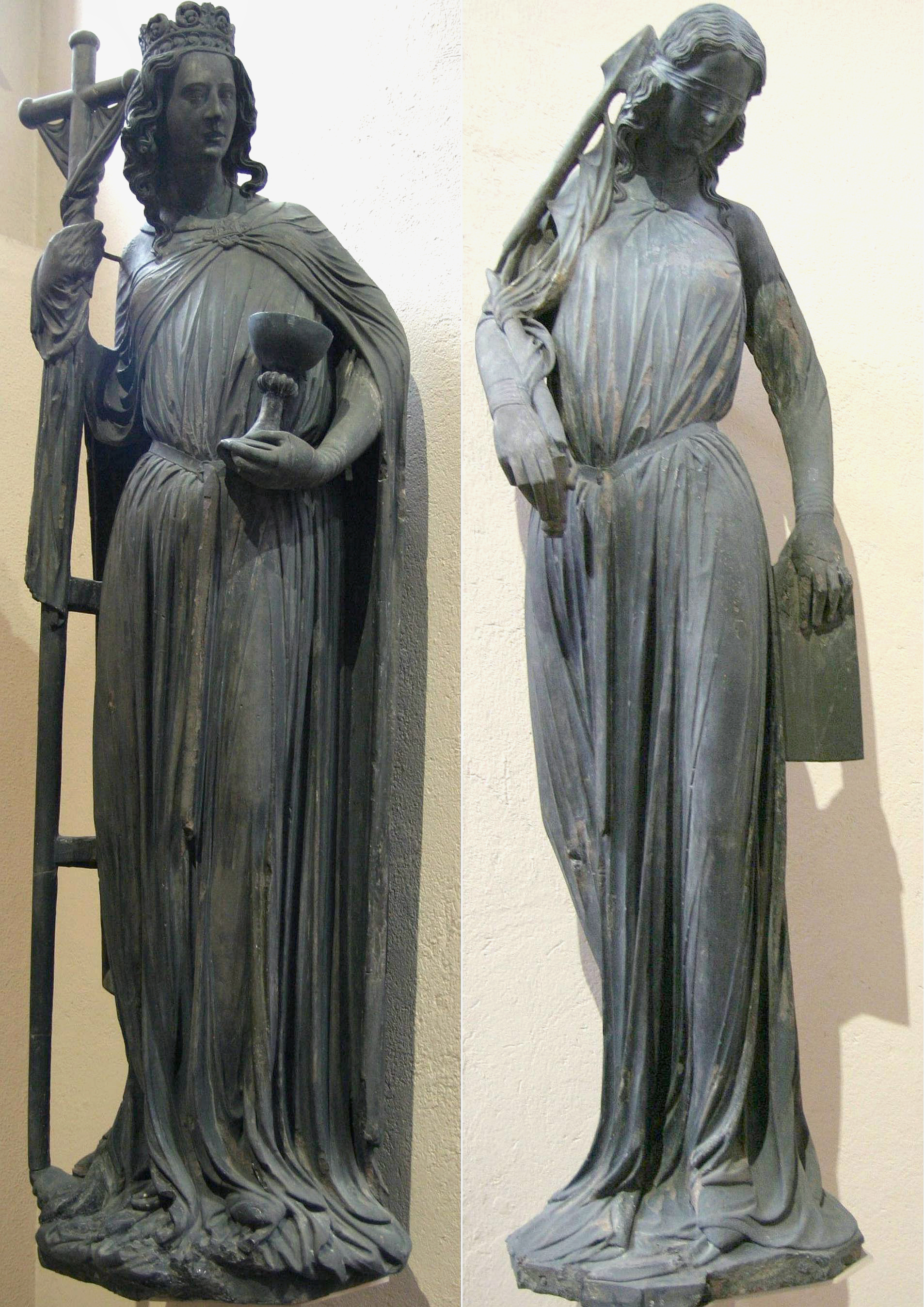
Ecclesia and Synagoga from Notre-Dame de Strasbourg

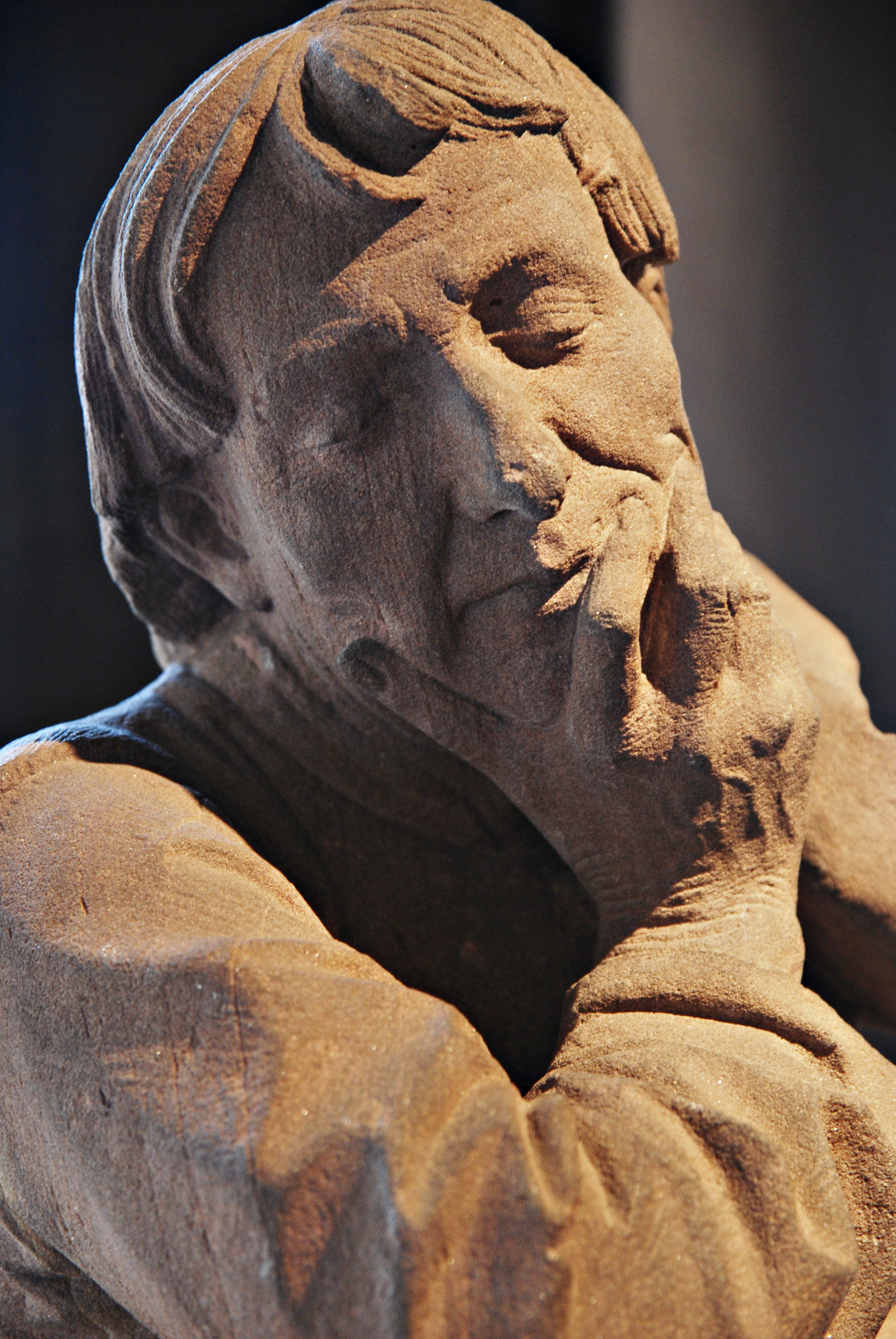
Self-portrait of Nikolaus Gerhaert

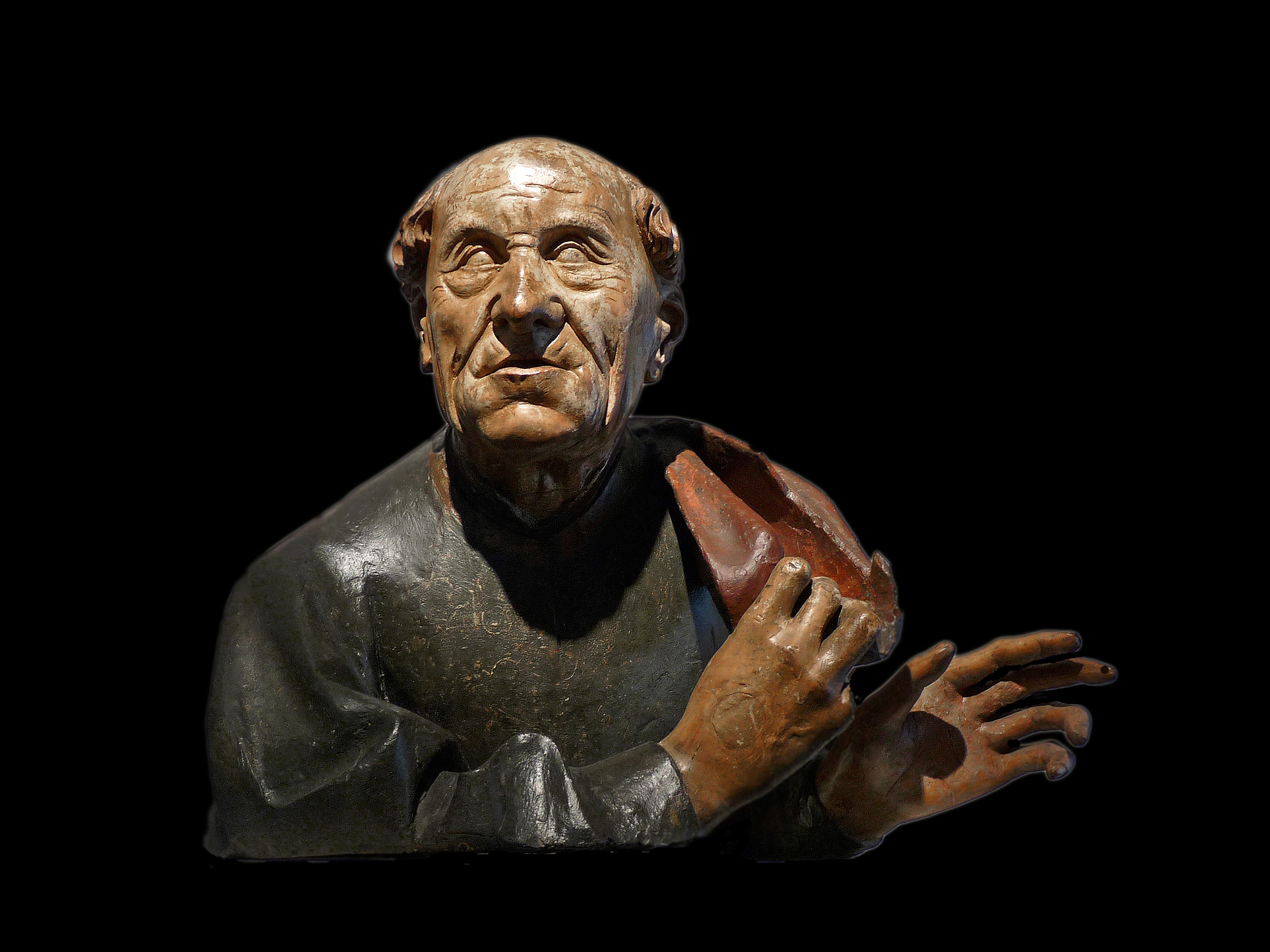
"Leaning Man" by Nikolaus Hagenauer

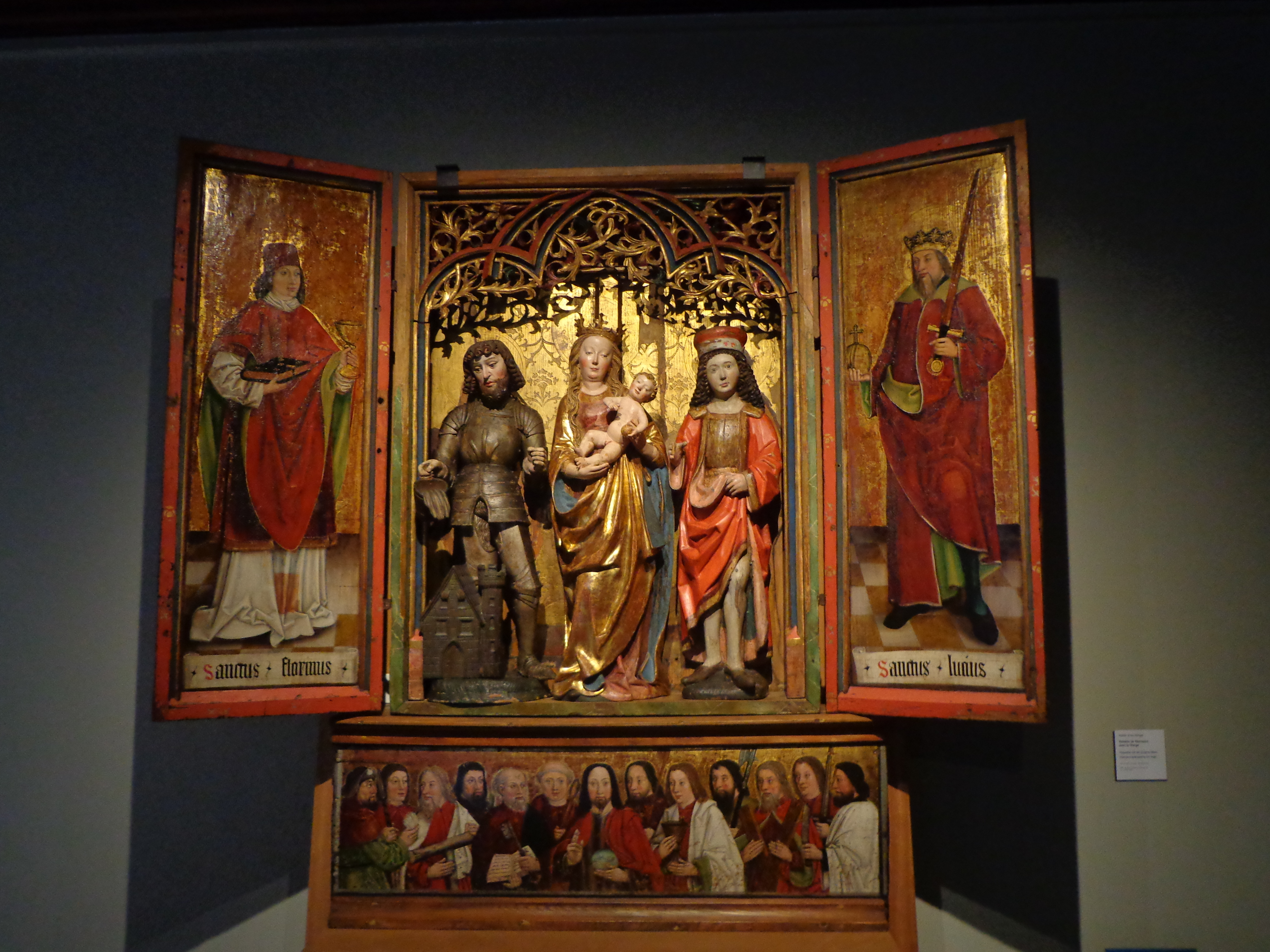
Altar by Ivo Strigel

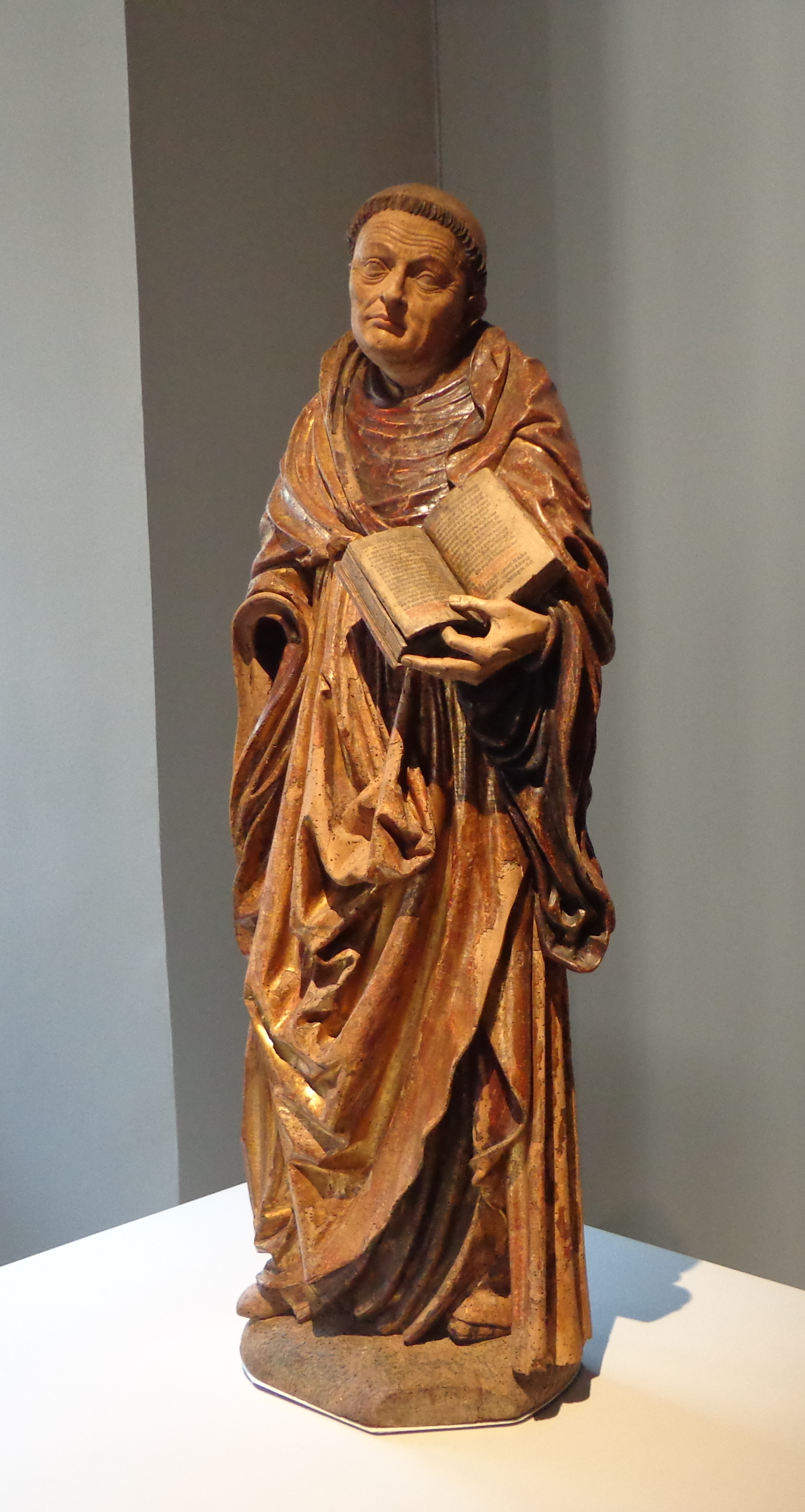
"Holy Monk" by Hans Wydyz

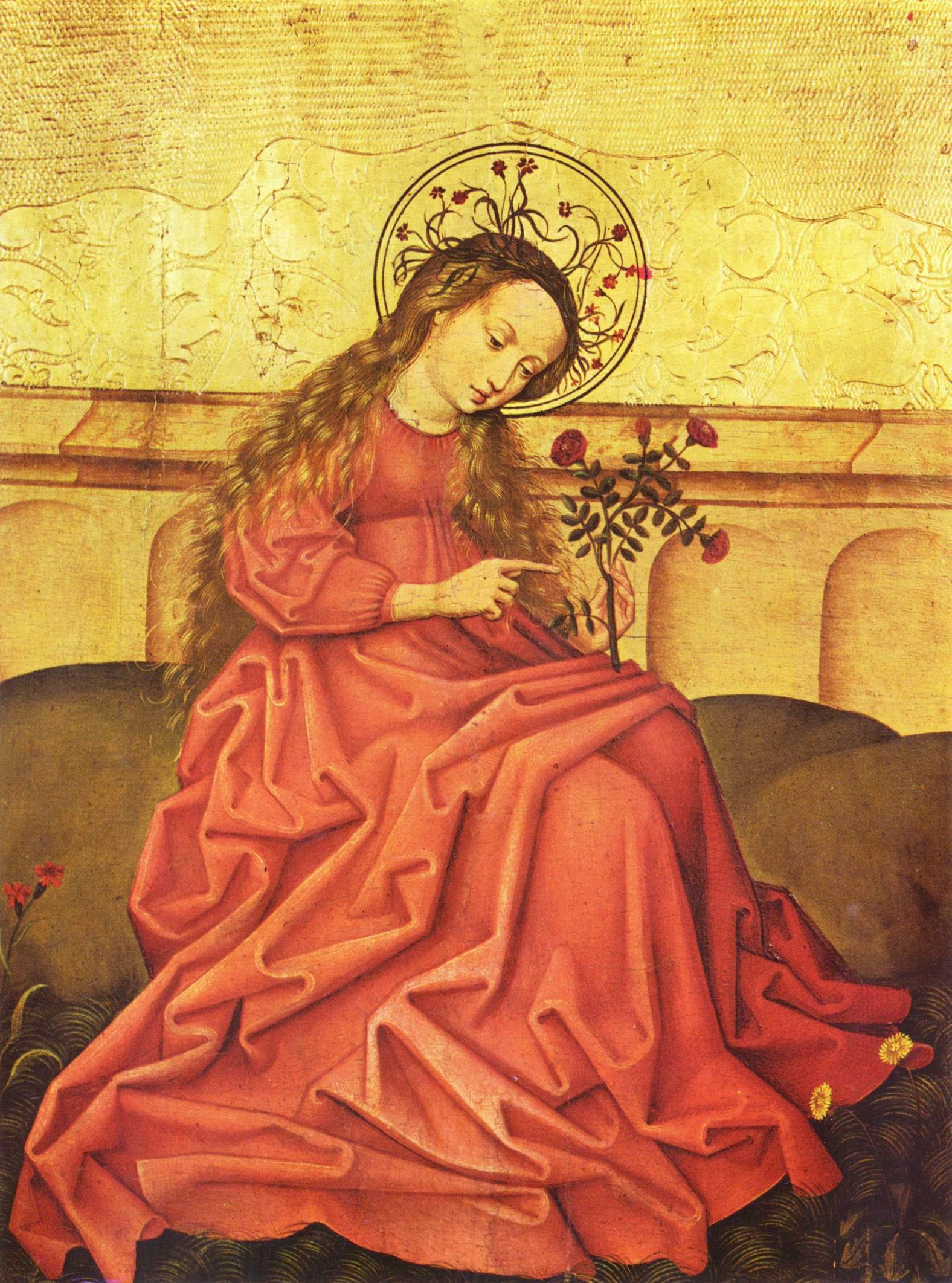
Anonymous master: "Madonna in a Garden"

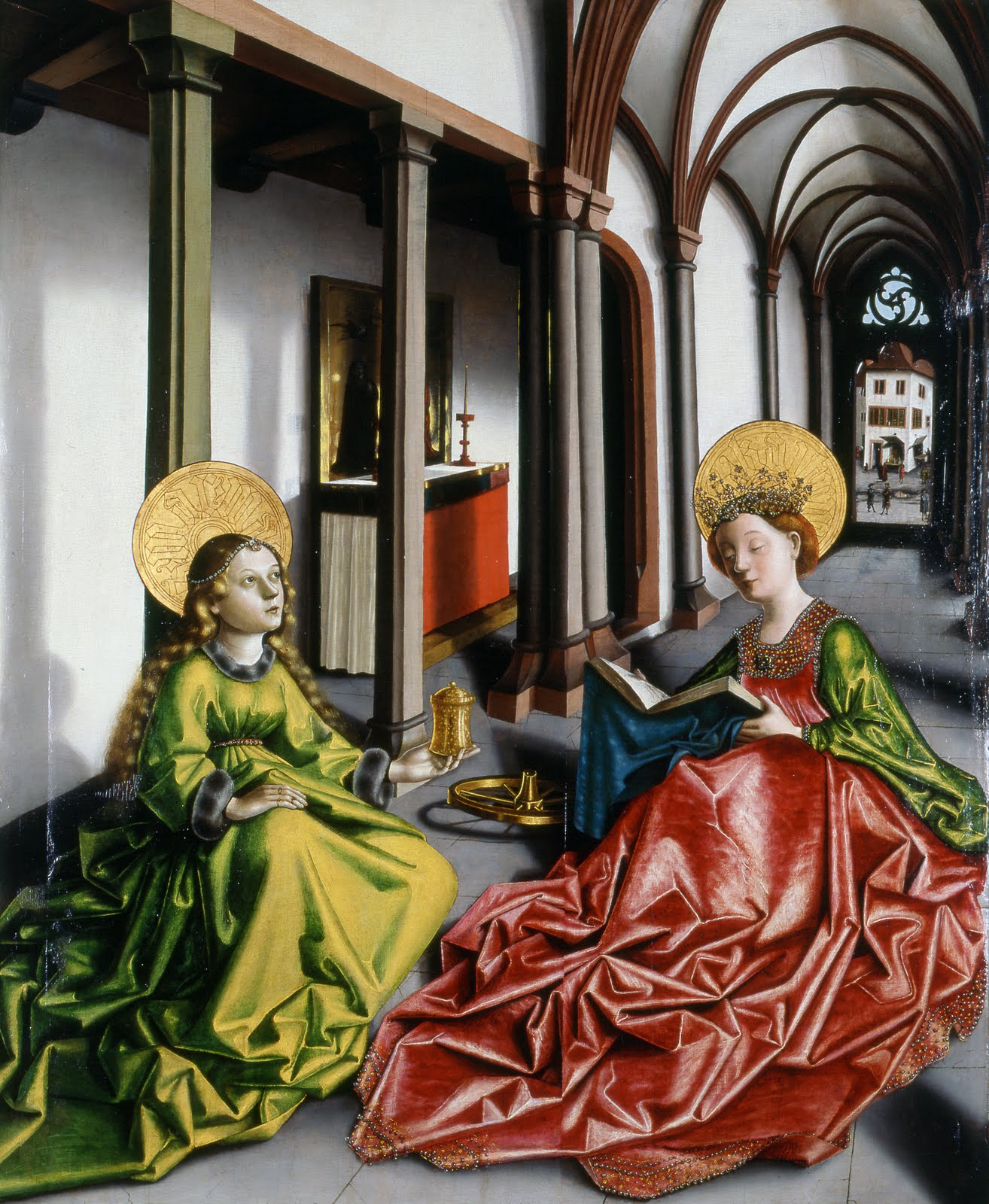
Konrad Witz: "Sts Catherine and Mary Magdalene"

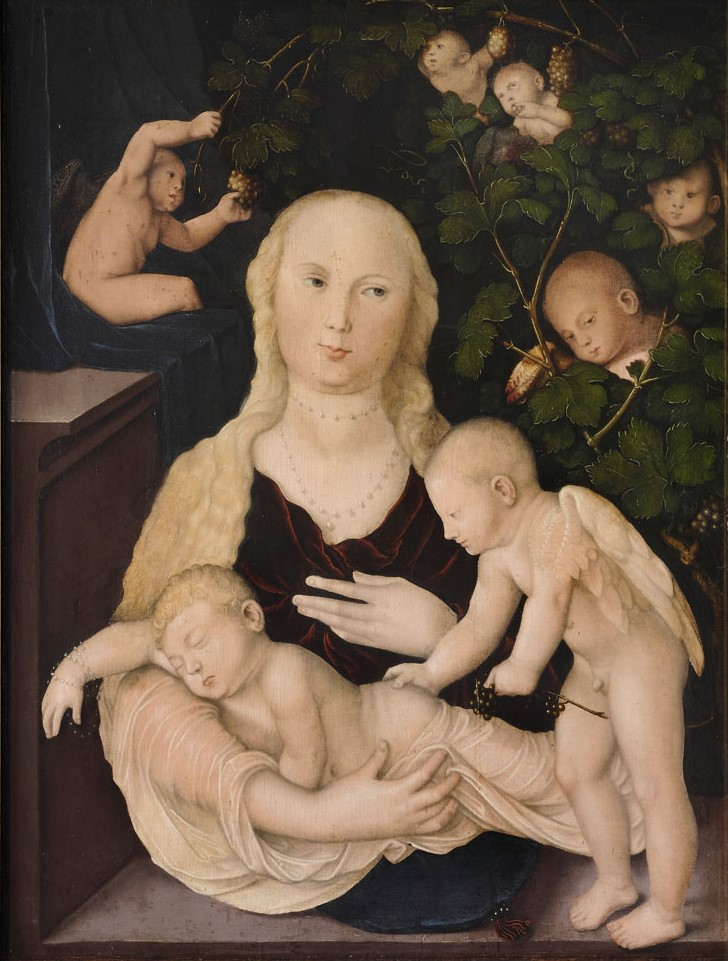
Hans Baldung: "Madonna in the Vine Arbour"

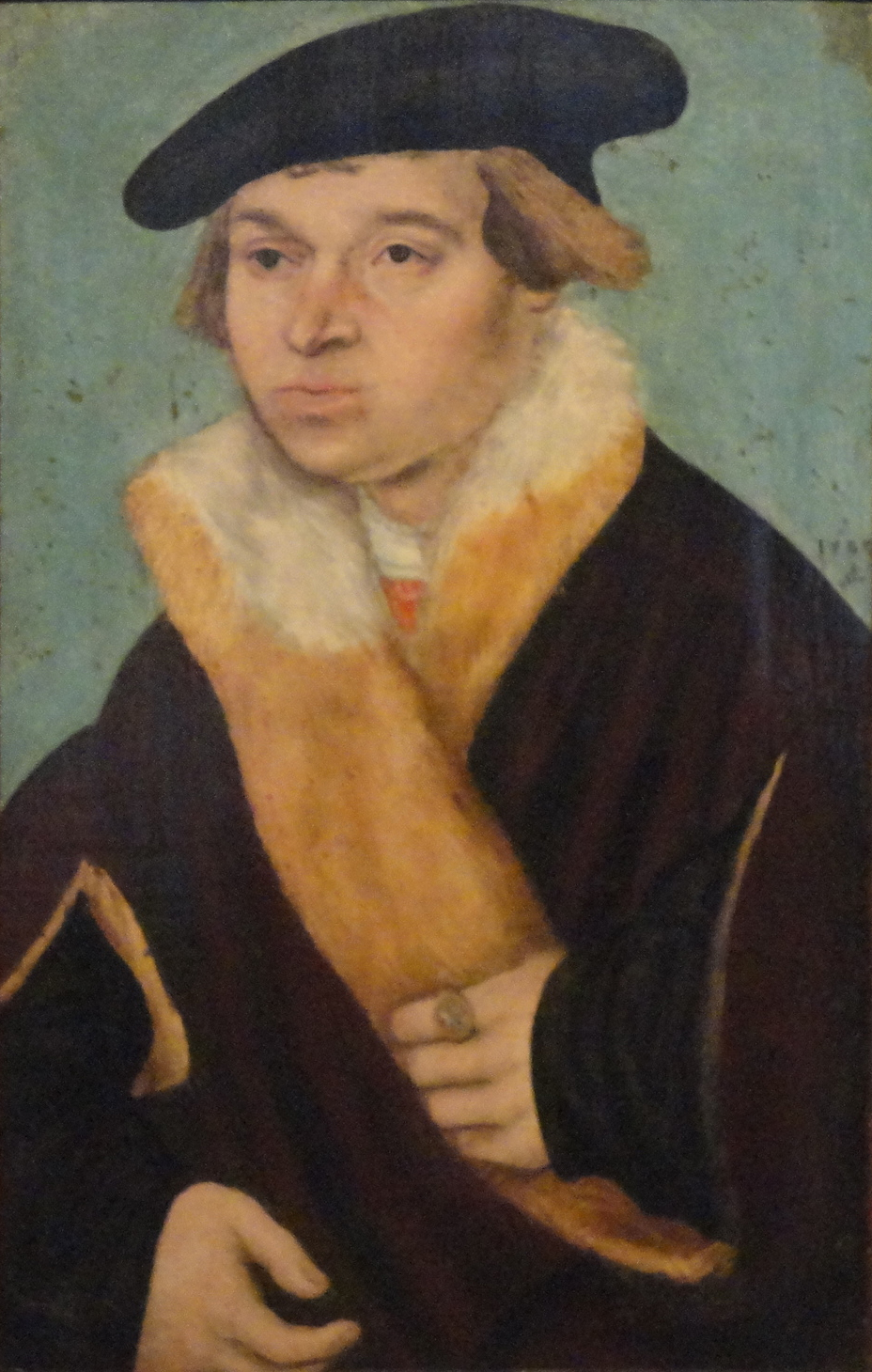
Lucas Cranach the Elder: "Portrait of a young Man"

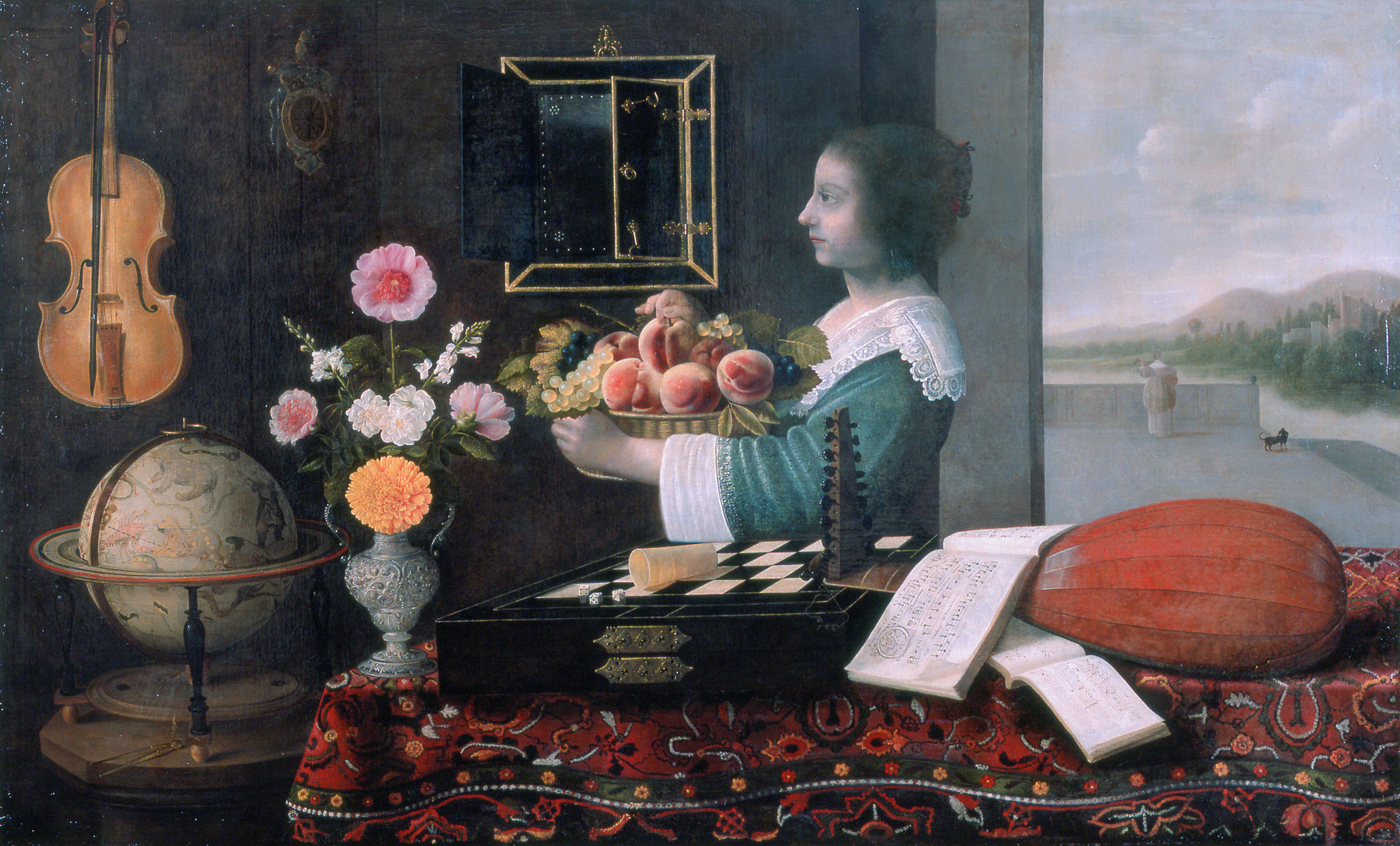
Sebastian Stoskopff: "Summer or the Five Senses"

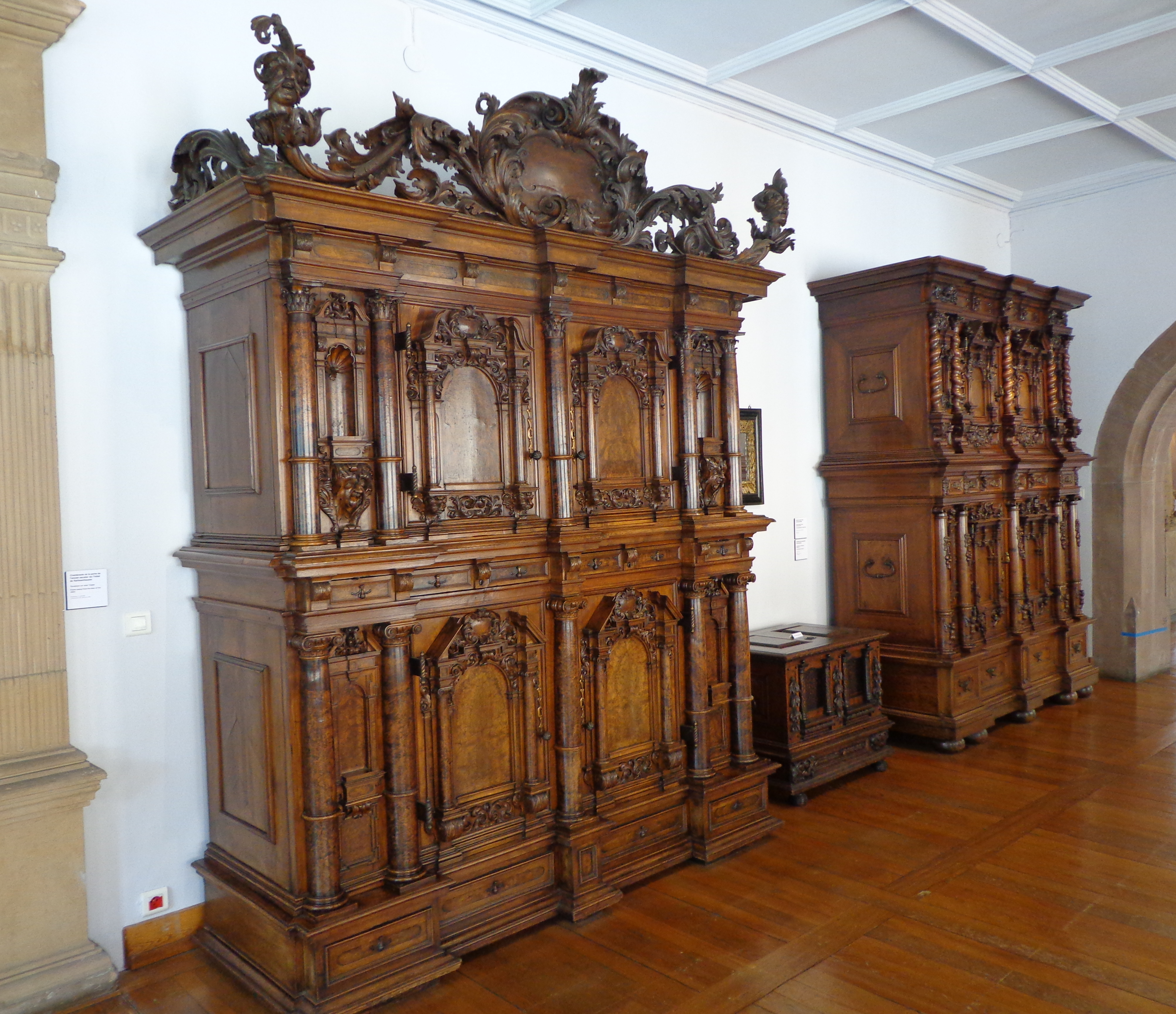
17th-century cupboards

== Literature ==
- Cécile Dupeux: Strasbourg, Musée de l’Œuvre Notre-Dame, Éditions Scala, Paris, 1999, ISBN 2-86656-223-2
- Cécile Dupeux et al.: Musée de l’Œuvre Notre-Dame. Arts du Moyen-Âge et de la Renaissance, Éditions des musées de Strasbourg, Strasbourg, 2013, ISBN 9782351251058
- Cécile Dupeux, Jean-David Touchais et al.: Œuvre Notre-Dame Museum. Arts of the Middle Ages, Éditions des musées de Strasbourg, Strasbourg, 2021, ISBN 9782351251751
