= Chemise binding =

Medieval book overcover

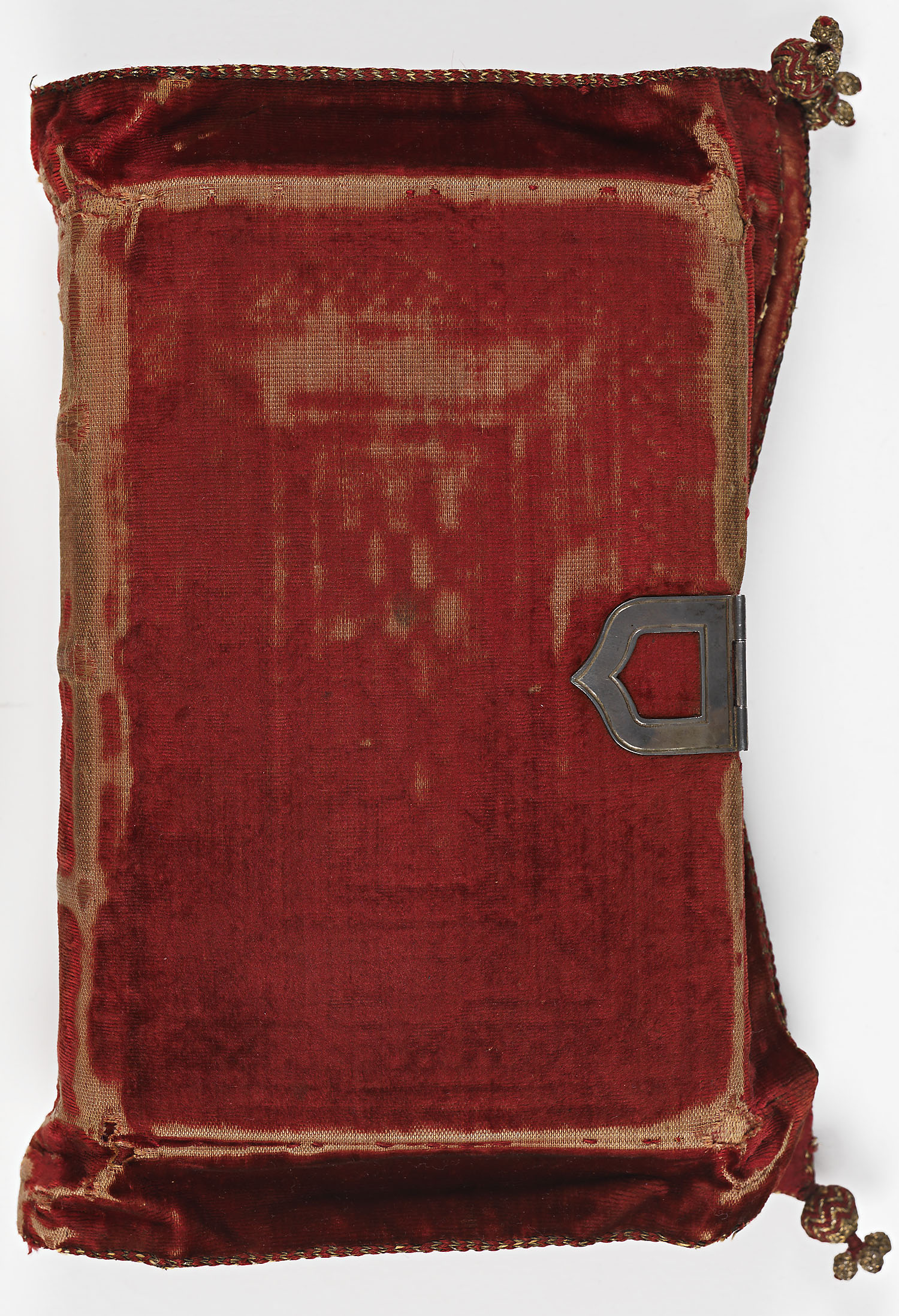
Chemise binding, c. 1460

Chemise binding (chemisette) was a protective cover for a book used between the 12th and 16th century. It could be a slip-on sleeve or an overcover attached to the volume, with the fabric protruding beyond the edges of a book allowing for full covering of the volume, thus offering additional protection of a highly valuable object. Chemise bindings were usually made of textiles such as silk, satin or velvet or, less frequently, animal skin. While there is some evidence to suggest that the first chemise bindings might have been produced in Italy, they are typically associated with late Middle Ages in Northern Europe and indeed feature prominently in art from this geographical region and period. Due to their fragile nature and their role as protection for the primary cover, only a limited number of chemise bindings survive. They were also a natural victim of book- and library-burnings during the religious upheaval ushered in by the Reformation. As a result, there are only 13 surviving examples of chemise bindings, all dating from the period 1460–1559.

Chemise bindings were used for protection of both sacred and secular volumes. Whilst their most common use was as an overcover for prayer books, such as book of hours, medieval men would also use chemise bindings for particularly important volumes, such as the books of the royal courts. The embroidery and embellishments adorning chemise bindings reflected the grandeur of their owner. Consequently, chemise bindings were demarcations of individuals' social status, devotional piety, and wealth.

== Devotional significance ==
Thirteenth century saw the emergence of a practice of using cushions on altars as supports for devotional books. Chemise bindings, when the book was open, would create an impression of a cushion supporting the volume, thus "emphasizing the traditional relationship between the cushion and the book."

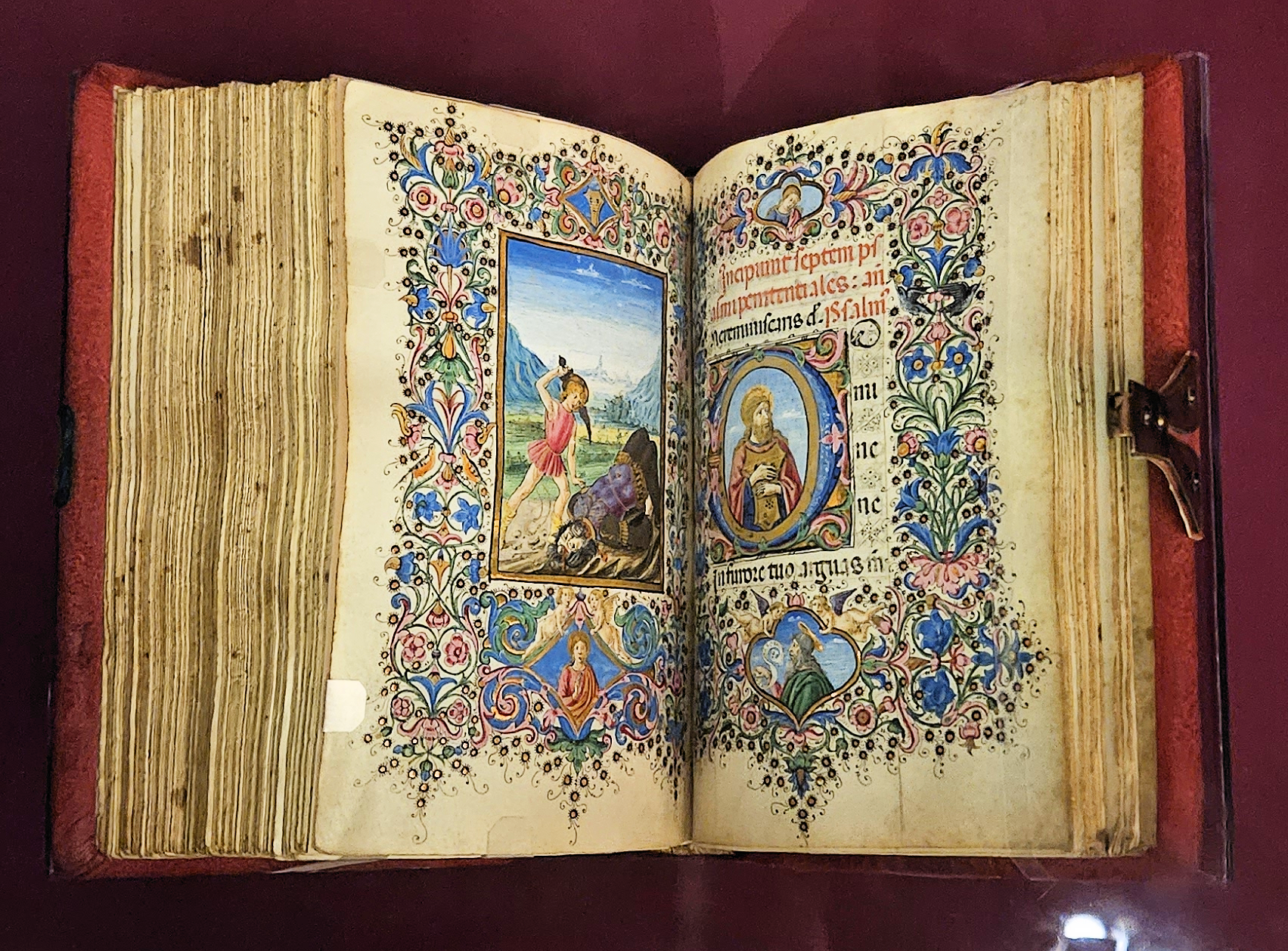
Book of Hours - Illuminated manuscript on parchment, Italy, 1485–1499. On display at the Huntington Library, San Marino, California, US.

Chemise bindings were an important part of the multisensory experience of prayer – arranging and unfolding one's book of hours, for instance, was a part of the ritual of prayer, creating an impression of a special, sacred moment. The act of draping prayer books in chemise bindings after prayer has been compared to the "ritual gestures of veneration at mass, benediction, and Corpus Christi processions." The motif of covering hands when handling sacred objects figures prominently in Early Christian art and the tradition of Judaism. The idea of covered hands handling books, and particularly the Bible, was symbolic of devotion, veneration and piety in medieval European culture. The presence of a covering made the space suitable for the Holy Word of God to be handled and received. Chemise bindings protecting private books of hours constituted an important part of the multisensory devotional ritual alongside candles, rosaries and sacred paintings.

== In art ==
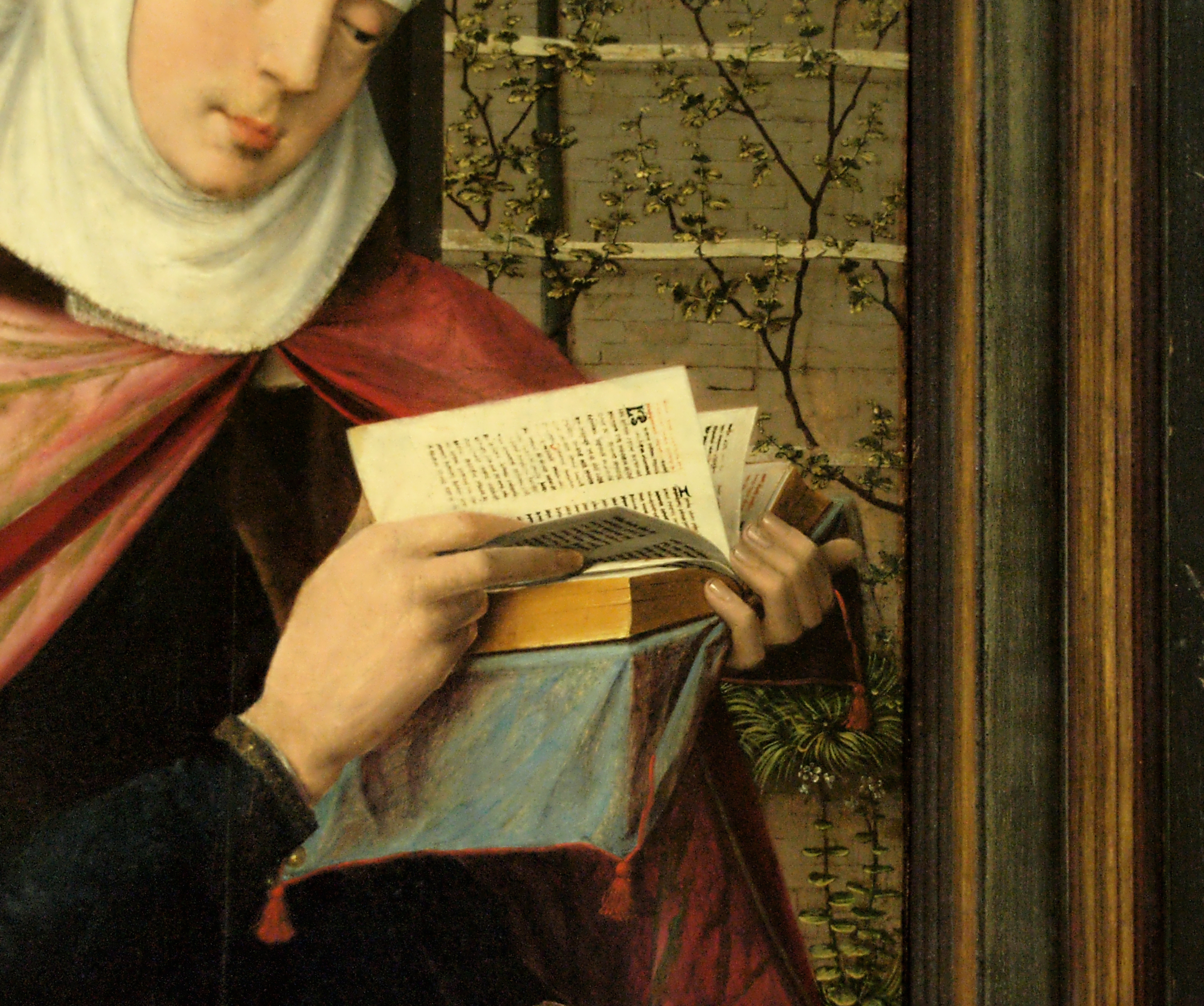
A chemise-bound liturgical book with gilt edges (Bruges?, 16th century)

A chemise binding was a symbol of the owner's spiritual devotion and, if it was particularly richly decorated or made of valuable textiles, social status. In medieval depictions, Saints, the Evangelists and scribes are usually seated in front of a draped lectern. In many instances, the depicted drapery is in fact a chemise binding of a handled book. The frequent inclusion of chemise bindings in art, particularly from Northern Europe, has constituted a foundation for art historical study of the fragile object.

Girdle books, portable protective bindings usually made of leather, are frequently depicted as attributes of saints, the Evangelists and Apostles.

== Decline in popularity ==
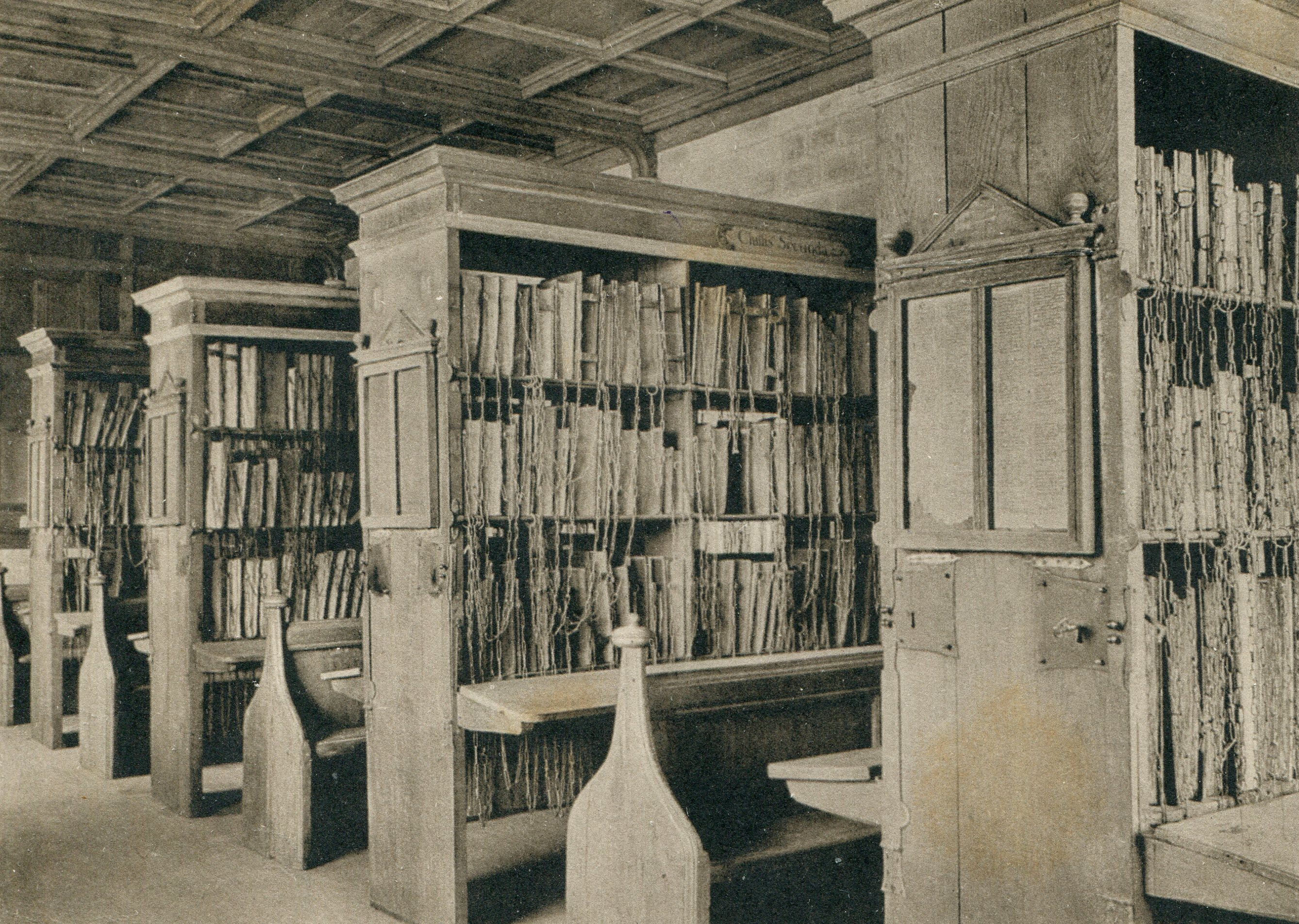
Hereford Cathedral Library. New book-storing method - shelving.

Invention of print in mid-15th century resulted in an increase of number of books in circulation and in collections. This impacted book storing practices, with tight shelving of volumes in rows next to one another becoming increasingly popular. Chemise bindings were in such context an inconvenient obstruction, and they began to fall out of favour.

Chemise bindings continued to be commissioned, produced and illustrated in books until the mid-16th century. The last known existing example of a textile chemise binding is from 1559 English indentures volume, now exhibited at the Public Record Office Museum.

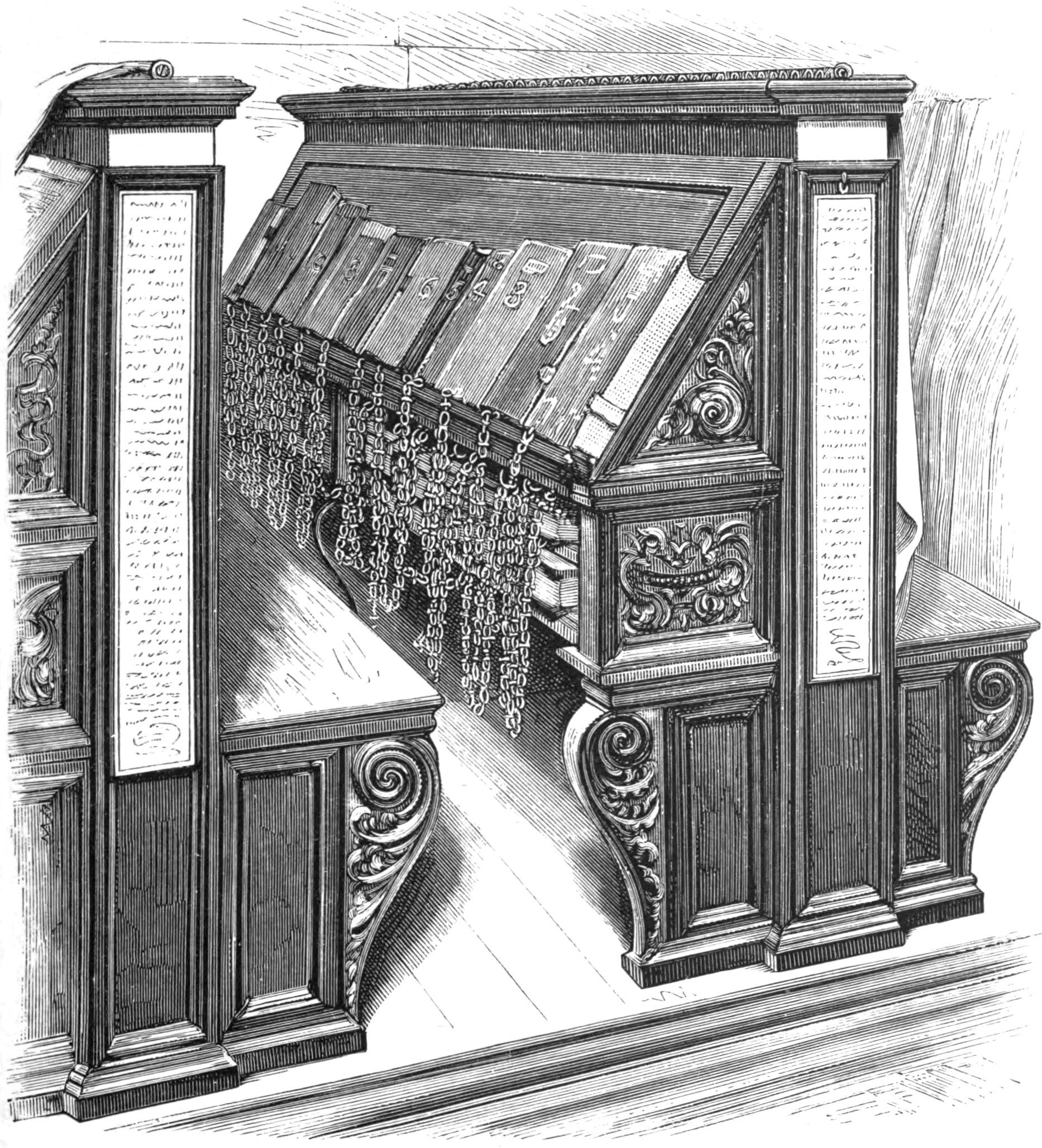
The medieval method of storing books. Book-desks and reader's seats in the Biblioteca Laurentiana, Florence from On the Vatican Library of Sixtus IV. Some of the depicted books feature a Hülleneinband.

Alongside print, another factor underpinning the decline in popularity of chemise bindings was the visual association of Catholic subjugation with chemise bindings and girdle books used by Catholic authorities, including those who persecuted Protestants en masse. John Foxe's Actes and Monuments (1563) depicted Catholic villains with girdle books which further entrenched the association of Catholicism with book overcovers. It has been suggested that Catholics removed overcovers, also chemise bindings, from their volumes to reduce the chances of their books being identified as Catholic and thus burnt.

== Terminology ==
Adolf Rhein was first to propose four terms allowing for categorisation of overcovers: textile chemise bindings, wrapper bindings (Hülleneinbände), Tragenhüllen, and girdle bindings.

The textile chemise bindings were intended for small and large books and featured short or long flaps. They were ‘most commonly attached to the bound book by pockets stitched to the inside of the chemise.'

The wrapper binding overcover (Hülleneinband) is made of tawed skin or leather, and the flaps extend beyond all edges of the book. They are substantially more durable than textile chemise bindings, and there are 49 surviving examples.

Tragenhüllen are wrapper bindings with the additional feature of a long tail-like flap allowing the owner to carry their book around. They later evolved into girdle bindings which could be made of any fabric, but they always featured a characteristic long tail allowing the owner to secure the book at their girdle. Most surviving examples are girdle books made of leather.

In English terminology, chemise binding emerged as an umbrella term for overcovers where fabric extends beyond the edges of a book other than girdle bindings.

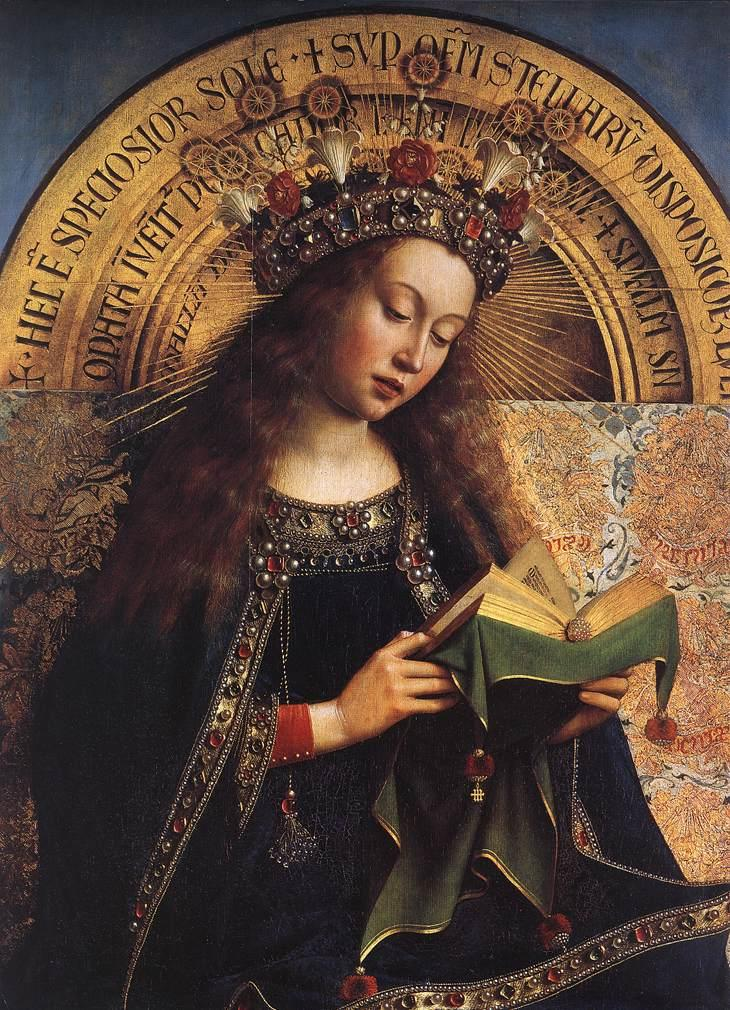
Jan van Eyck, The Ghent Altarpiece - Virgin Mary (detail). The Bible is draped in a chemise binding.

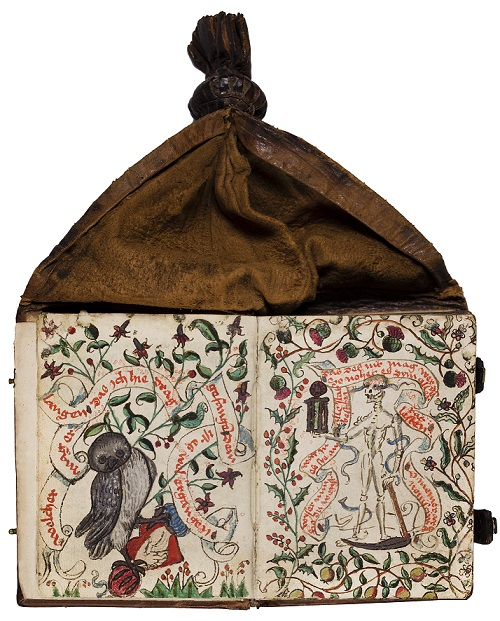
16th century girdle book

== Girdle books ==
Girdle book binding, typically made of leather, evolved from Tragenhüllen. They could be carried around conveniently and safely when attached to the owner's belt. The girdle book would hang head-down when not used but once swung up, it was ready to be read. The owner could then simply drop the girdle book which would be ready for next reading. The cover protected the book from adverse weather conditions, dust and general wear and tear. Girdle books therefore became popular amongst religious orders and clergy who would carry their breviaries, psalters and books of hours. The format was also used by the laity, for whom book ownership – often a book of hours – was a status symbol. In the 15th century, girdle books became almost fashion accessory signalling the owner's intellectual curiosity, piety and an extent of literacy. Due to their portability, girdle books became favoured by judges and law enforcement authorities. Some volumes recording city laws, tax and donations are so large they were most likely "looped over the saddle horn, or carried like shoulder-bags." There are only 25 known surviving girdle books, all dating back to the period between the 14th and 16th centuries, vast majority of Northern European origin. The widespread presence of girdle books in medieval art, however, suggests they were substantially more popular than the number of surviving examples would suggest. The decline in their popularity was partly a result of the inclusion of pockets in medieval garments around the end of the fifteenth century. Many tails of girdle books were cut off when volumes began to be stored on shelves.

== Notable examples ==
=== Indentures between Henry VII and John Islip, Abbot of Westminster ===
The oldest surviving English velvet chemise binding is one made for Indentures between Henry VII and John Islip, Abbot of Westminster, regarding the foundation of the king's chapel. The chemise is made of red velvet with some pint damask additions, likely imported from Italy. It features silver and gold enamelled bosses on both sides of the overcover – these were very common before 1500, answering to the contemporary lectern-style shelving methods, thus protecting the fabric from wear and tear. The chemise is fastened by silver clasps with red roses.

The manuscript was bequeathed to the Bodleian Library in Oxford in 1755 and remains there to this day (MS. Rawl. C. 370).

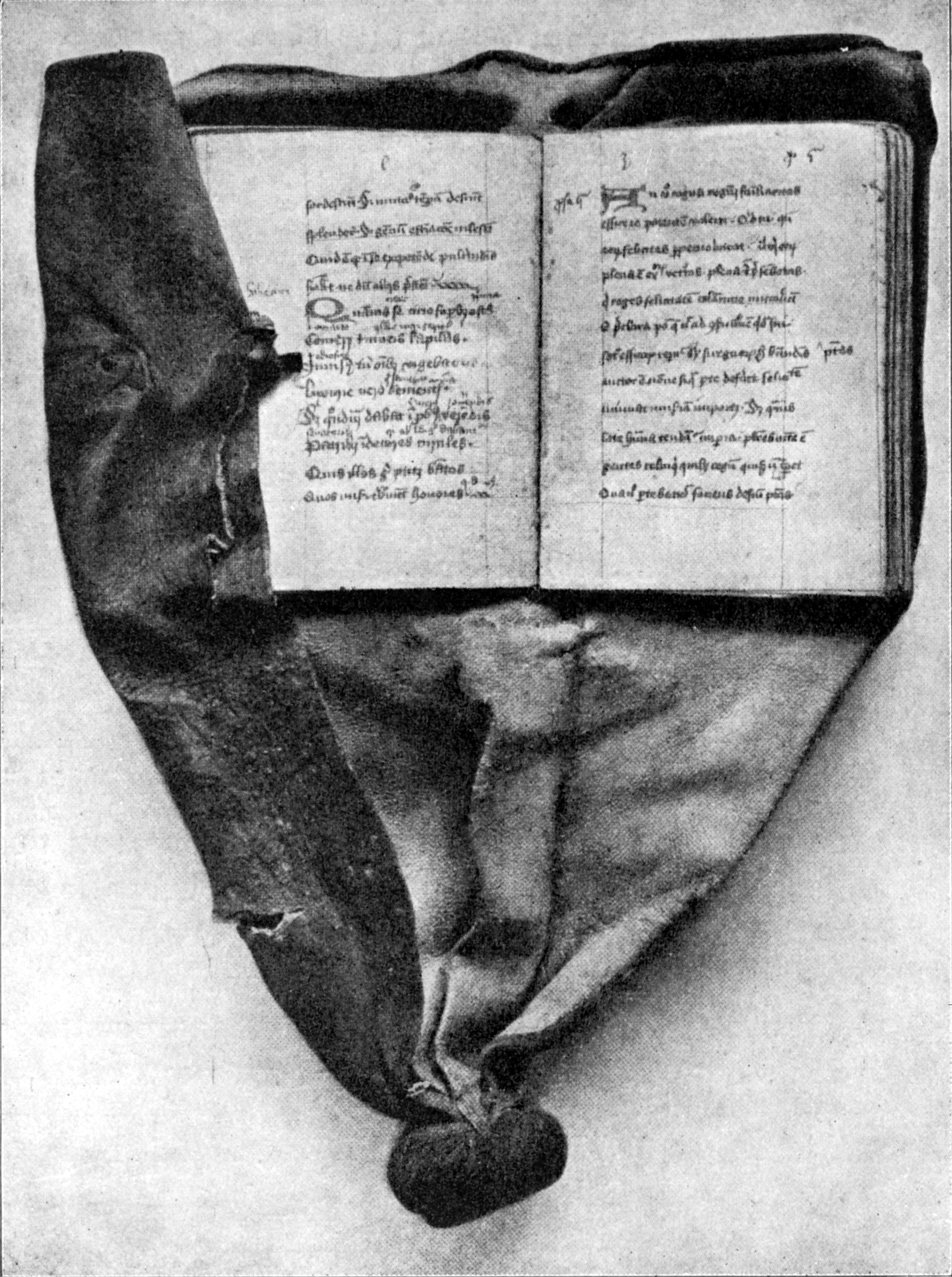
Girdle book from Yale University Library, MS 84

=== The Yale Girdle Book (New Haven, Beinecke MS 84) ===
The Yale Girdle Book, a small volume composed of 171 parchment leaves, was most likely used and made in England. It features Boethius's Consolation of Philosophy exploring the themes of "human nature, fortune, fate, emotion, reason, and one's place in the universe." The book wrapping enveloping the entire volume is made of a soft leather. This unique girdle binding of the book was possibly a symbolic reflection of the focus of the Consolations on an "explicit derision of the body", providing the reader with a multisensory experience.

=== The works of Pandolfo Collenuccio and Lucian ===
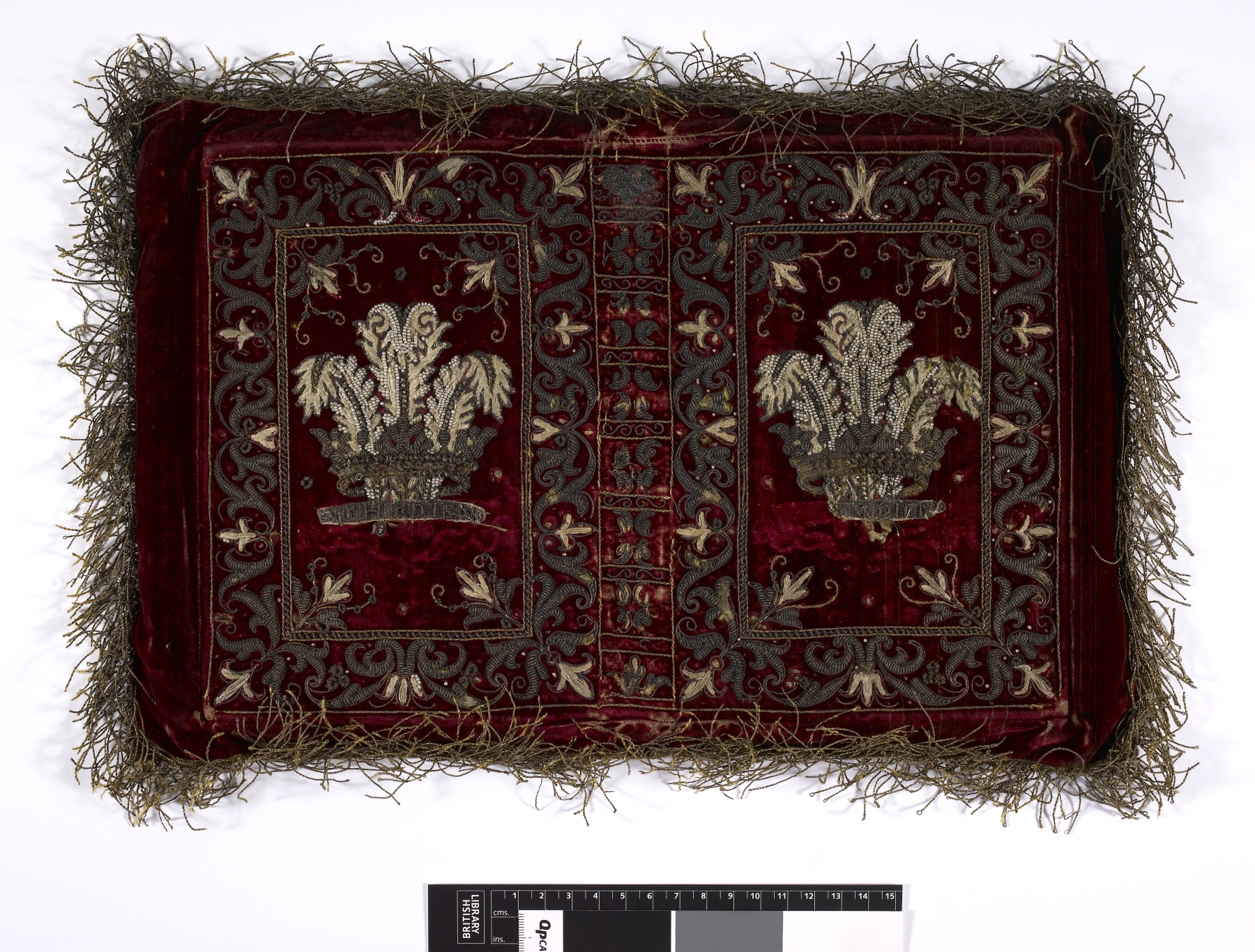
Chemise binding embroidered with gold and silver thread and seed-pearls with the badge and motto of Henry Frederick (stored separately from manuscript). --Pandolfo Collenuccio, Apologues and - Upper cover (Royal Ms 12 C VIII)

The manuscript was originally commissioned by Geoffrey Chamber, and later found its way to the collections of Henry VIII. The chemise binding however was added by yet another owner of the volume – Prince Henry, son of James I of England and VI of Scotland, a notable book-collector. The book was gifted to him by Nicholas Bond, President of Magdalen College, Oxford, upon Prince Henry's matriculation in 1605. The ornate chemise binding made of crimson velvet is decorated with pearls and embroidered with gold and silver thread. It features the badge and motto of Prince Henry who in 1610 became Prince of Wales.

The manuscript and its chemise binding are now kept at the British Library (MS Royal 12 C. viii).

=== Hülleneinband MS Germ 20 at UCL Special Collections ===
The Hülleneinband was donated to University College London by Sir Edgar Speyer in 1911. The overcover comes from the 15th century and is made of a soft and supple alum-tawed sheepskin. It serves as an overcover for a small volume of Passio Christi. The binding is also made from alum-tawed sheepskin. It is suspected that the Hülleneinband was originally a girdle binding, but the tail was cut off. The wars of religion in the 16th century, new shelving techniques and demand for leather for alternative uses have all been listed as possible reasons as to why the tail was cut off.

=== The Royal Psalter of Sainte Chapelle ===
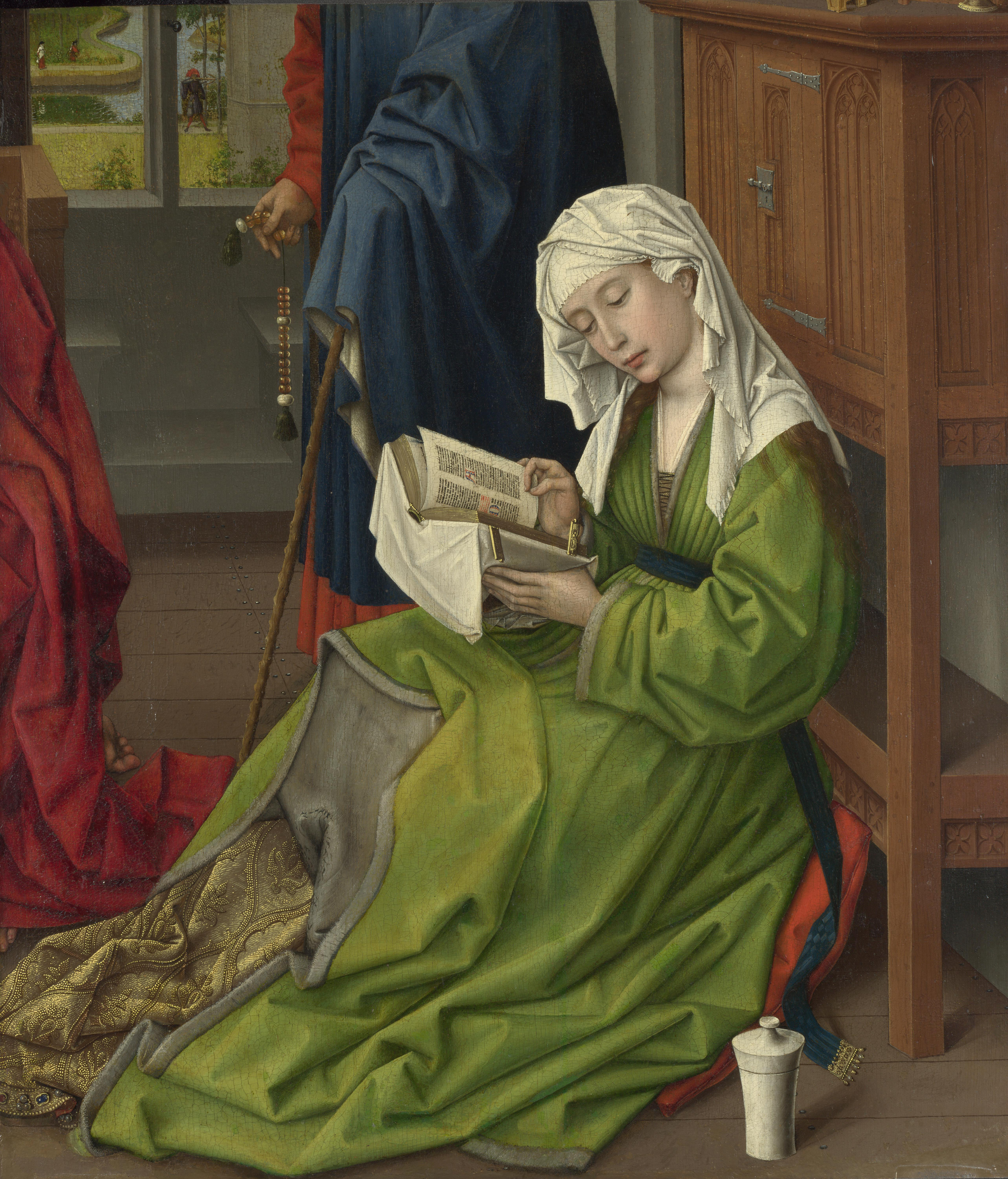
St Magdalen Reading - Rogier van der Weyden. The book has a chemise binding.

The chemise binding of the Royal Psalter of Sainte Chapelle, also known as the Psalter of Blanche of Castile, is one of the three medieval embroidered book bindings that survive to this day in France. The manuscript itself was most likely made for Blanche of Castile but belonged to her son, Louis IX. The chemise binding was commissioned and donated by Charles VI in 14th century to protect the Psalter which had become a relic after canonisation of Louis IX. It is made of blue silk embroidered with one hundred golden fleurs-de-lis. The golden thread is made of yellow silk threads which have been individually covered in a golden metallic alloy. The backside of the chemise binding was originally covered in red fabric, which has since worn off.

From 1330s until the end of the 18th century, the manuscript was stored in the treasury of Sainte Chapelle. The Psalter was moved to Bibliothèque de l'Arsenal in 1798, and in 19th century it was briefly exhibited at the Musée des Souvrains. It is now back at the Bibliothèque de l'Arsenal (MS 1186).

== See also ==
- Bookbinding
- Manuscript
- Illuminated manuscript
