= Saint Madeleine and Saint Catherine (Witz) =

Painting by Konrad Witz

- Saint Catherine and Saint Madeleine
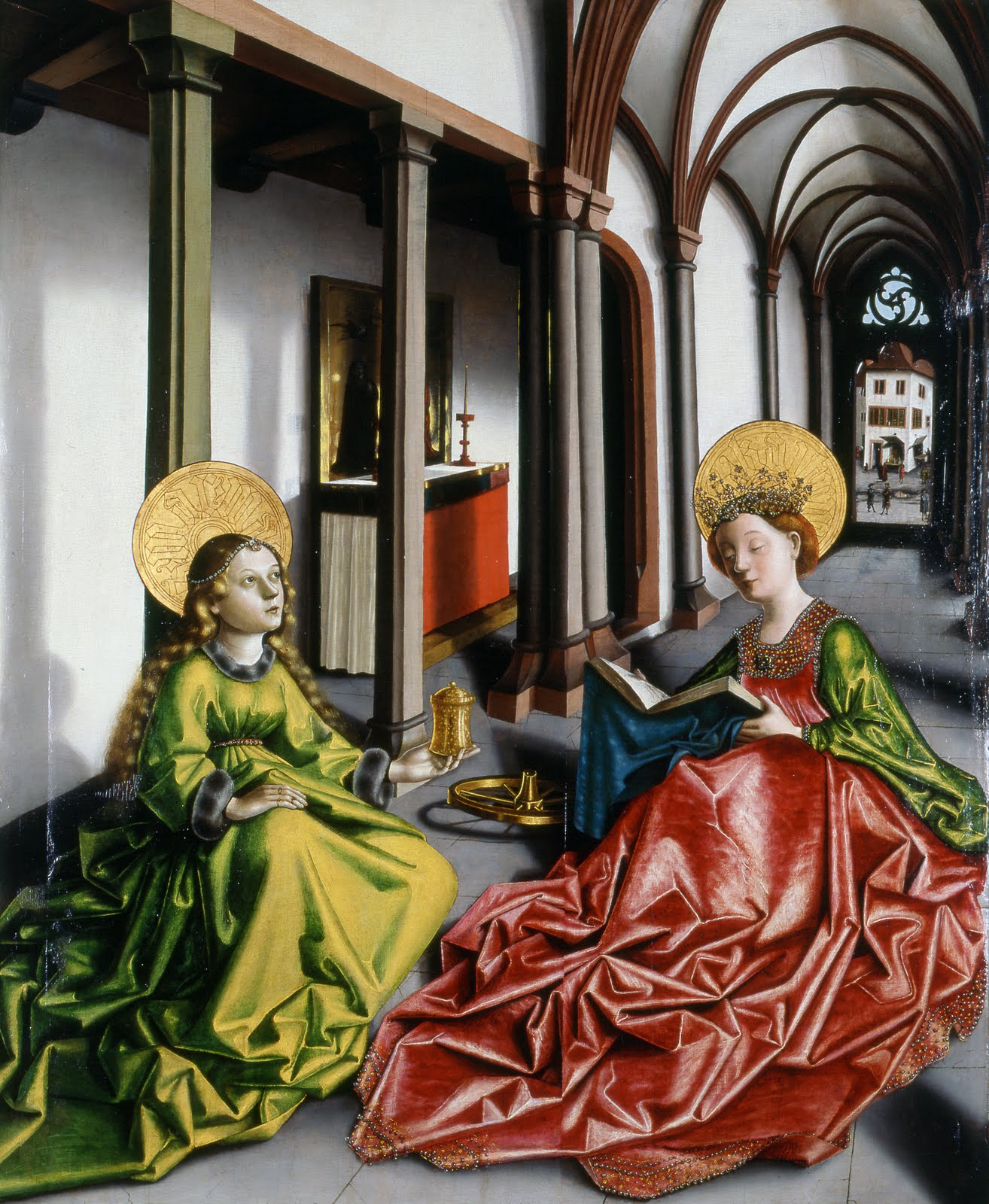
- Artist: Konrad Witz
- Year: circa 1440
- Medium: oil painting on panel (fir)
- Movement: Gothic art Catholic art
- Subject: Catherine of Alexandria and Mary Magdalene
- Dimensions: 161 cm × 130 cm (63 in × 51 in)
- Location: Musée de l'Œuvre Notre-Dame, Strasbourg
- Accession: 1893

Saint Madeleine and Saint Catherine, also known as Saint Catherine and Saint Madeleine, is a circa 1440 religious painting by the German Gothic artist Konrad Witz. The painting was legated to the city of Strasbourg by the canon Alexandre Joseph Straub, and entered the collections in 1893. It is on display in the Musée de l'Œuvre Notre-Dame. Its inventory number is MBA 97 ("MBA" stands for Musée des Beaux-Arts).

The painting represents both saints with their attributes (Madeleine's vessel of ointment, and Catherine's wheel and book, here a girdle book). In spite of the sumptuosity of their costumes and jewels, and the preciosity of their golden halos, Witz depicts them with the realistic faces of young peasant women and in a stiff attitude that reminds of play acting. Both saints are sitting in a cloister that is thought to have belonged to Basel Cathedral, and Witz opens his tentative perspective towards a street scene, again depicted with noticeable realism.

The painting may have belonged to an unfinished altarpiece (probably a triptych) but it could also have been autonomous from the start. While the drapery displays the influence of contemporary Netherlandish painting, the spatial perspective appears to be Witz's own, pioneering experiment.
