= Girdle book =

Portable book tied to a belt

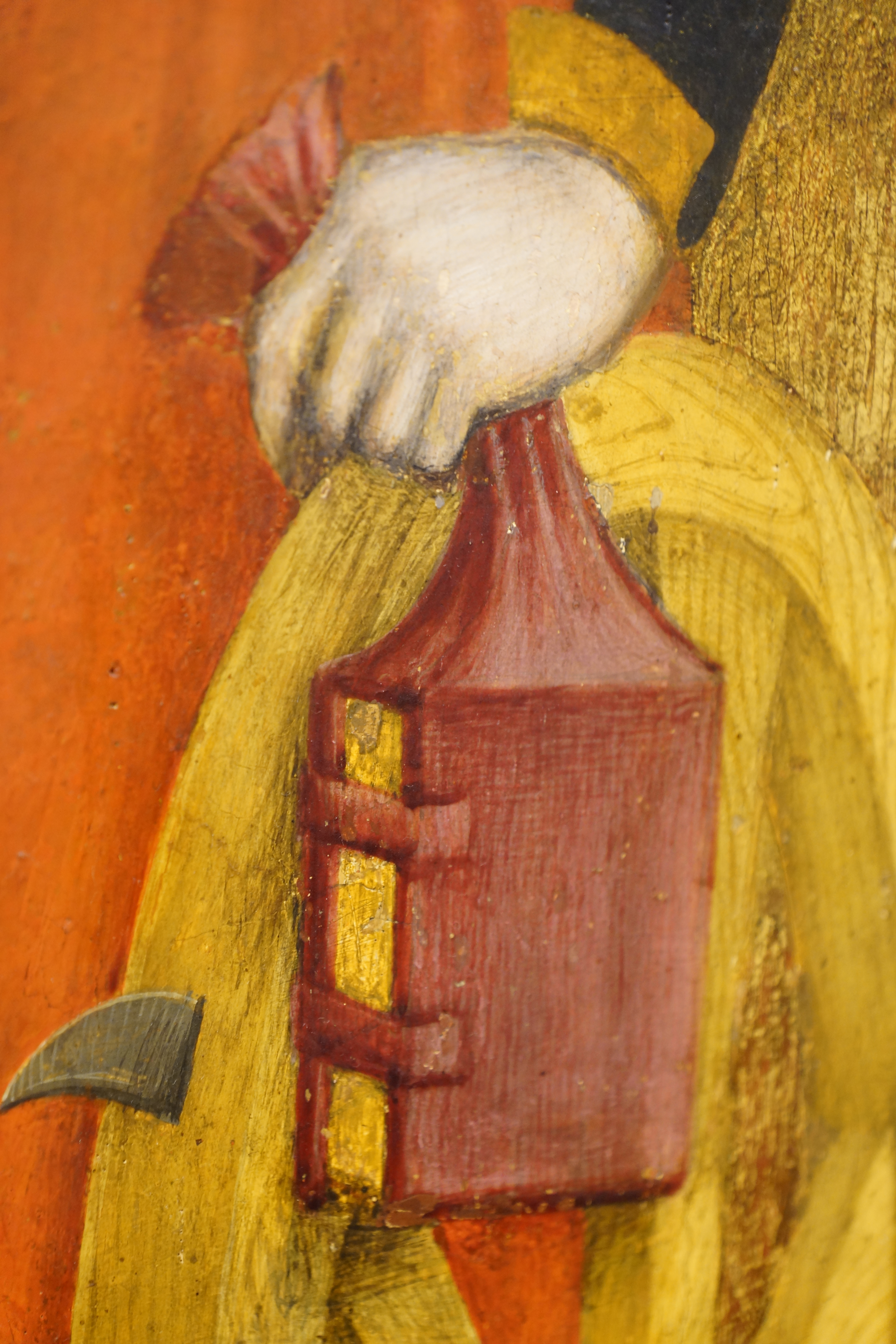
Saint Catherine of Alexandria holds a girdle book.

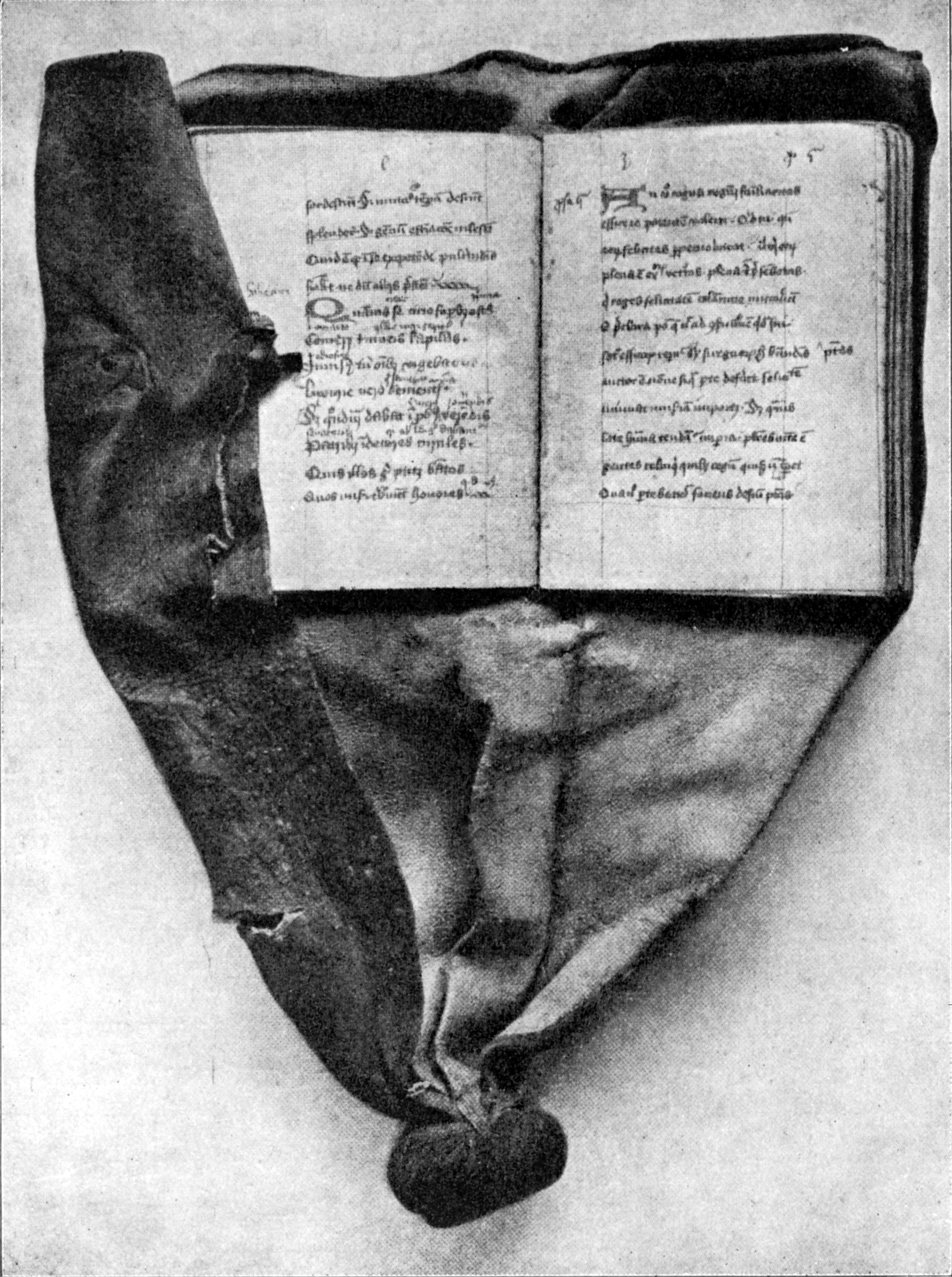
An open girdle book. Note the tied knot used for easy holding and the relatively small size of the book itself.

Girdle books were small portable books worn by medieval European monks, clergymen and aristocratic nobles as a popular accessory to medieval costume, between the 13th and 16th centuries. They consisted of a book whose leather binding continued loose below the cover of the book in a long tapered tail with a large knot at the end which could be tucked into one's girdle or belt. The knot was usually strips of leather woven together for durability. The book hung upside down and backwards so that when swung upwards it was ready for reading. The books were normally religious: a cleric's daily Office, or for lay persons (especially women) a Book of Hours. One of the best known texts to become a girdle book is Boethius's The Consolation of Philosophy, although it is the only surviving philosophical/theological girdle book.

Women especially wore the girdle book out of convenience since it was already fashionable, at least in the 15th century, to wear a girdle belt above the waistline. A book secured on the girdle belt served both the utilitarian function of enabling hands-free carrying and protecting valuable books from theft and the elements. It also made a visible statement of social position, wealth and learning (or at least literacy). Authoritative figures, saints or apostles like St. Jerome were often depicted holding girdle books. Girdle books also appeared to be a fashionable accessory for lay women. Artistic depictions of the girdle book confirm their popularity as an accessory.

Girdle books first appeared in the late 13th century and gained popularity through the 15th, sometimes becoming ostentatious jewel-encrusted presentation books, and falling out of favour late in the 16th century, when printed books had become much more common. Another possible reason for their decline was the relatively small number of specialized girdle-protected texts becoming outdated with little need to replace them. In an environment of increasingly cheap printing it was simpler to replicate texts than spend time preserving individual manuscripts. The intricately constructed girdle bindings were simply impractical after a certain point.

== In art ==
There are hundreds of artistic representations of girdle books. The Virgin Mary is shown reading one in such famous paintings as the Ghent Altarpiece and Mérode Altarpiece, and Saint Catherine reads one in the painting with Mary Magdalene by Konrad Witz. The donor reads one in Jan van Eyck's Madonna with Canon van der Paele. Their popularity in art indicates a much wider distribution and adoption of the girdle book as a binding than surviving copies suggest. But in art, books not being read tend to be carried by the folds of the cover rather than secured to the belt, and many are too large to be carried around as an accessory.

A list of 150 examples "shows the proportion of representation in painting and in sculpture [as] almost equal". However, only 23 medieval girdle books have survived in their original binding, the oldest datable example being from Kastl, Germany (ca. 1453). At least part of the reason for the small number of surviving examples stems from the fact that the use of the girdle book was largely confined to a narrow area from the Netherlands to the Upper Rhine Valley.

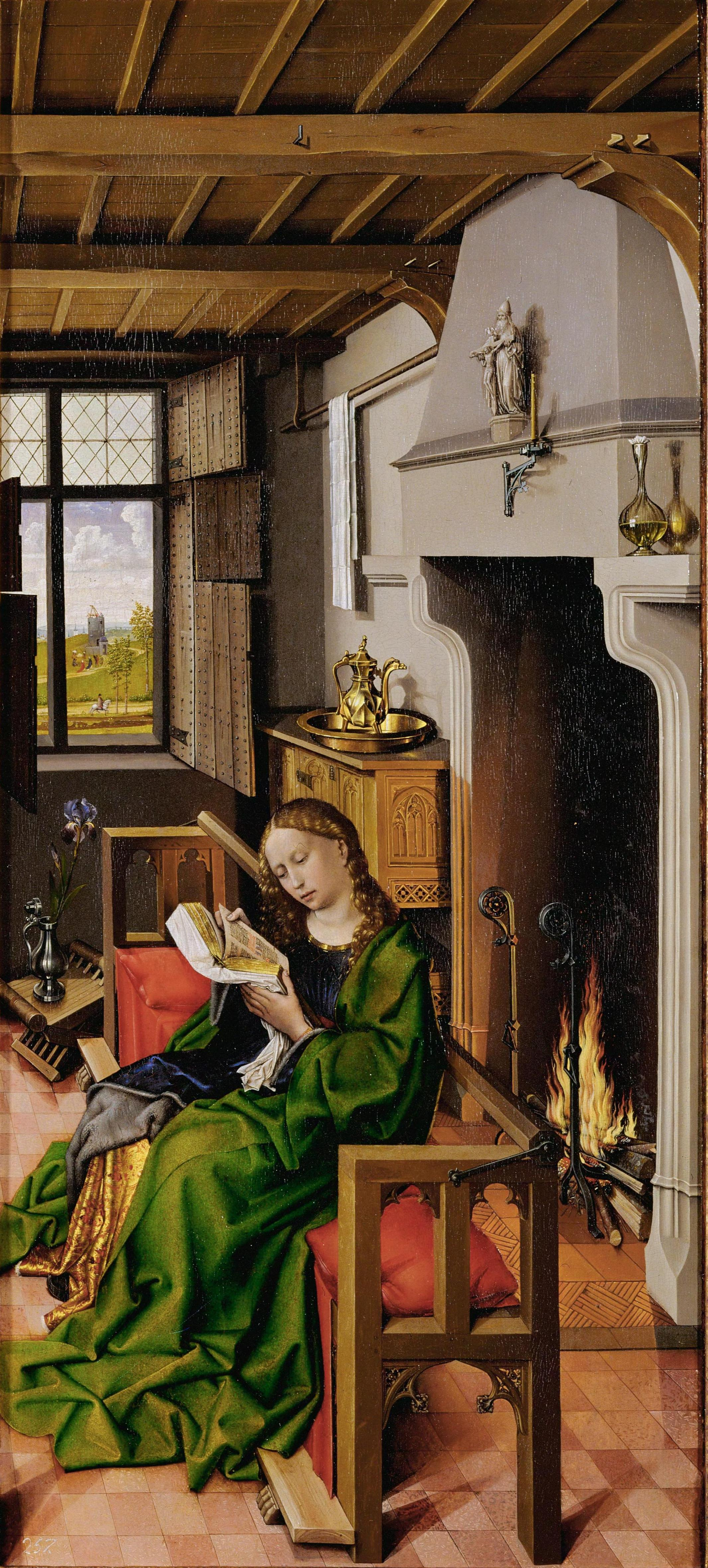
Saint Barbara, wing of the Werl Triptych, Robert Campin

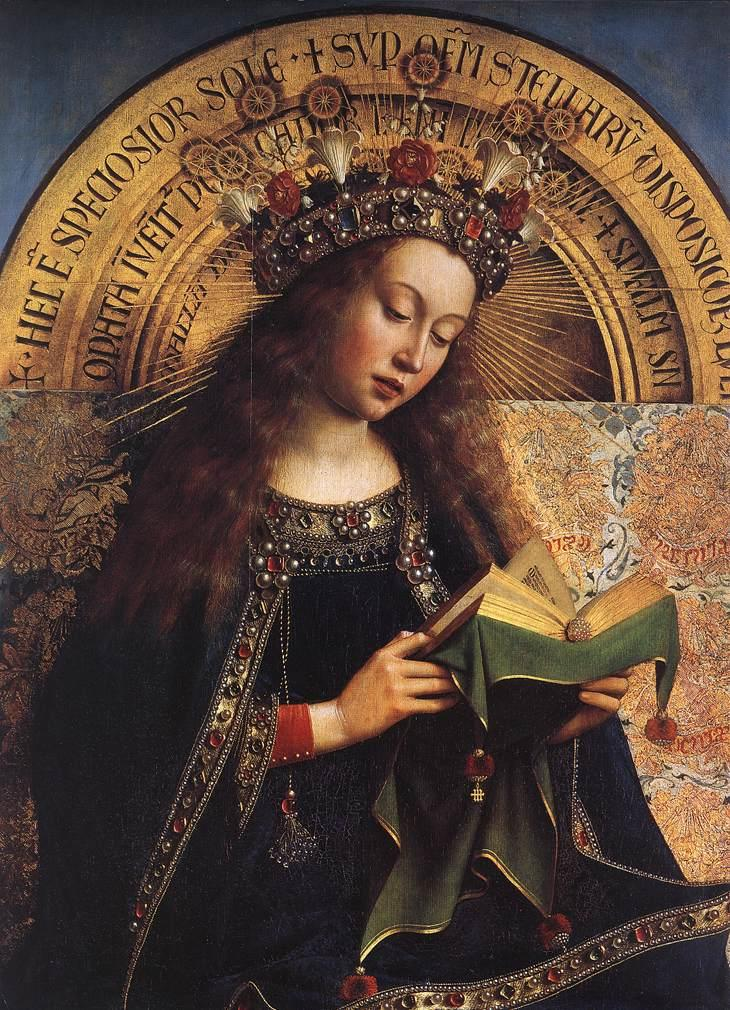
Jan van Eyck, Ghent Altarpiece, Virgin Mary

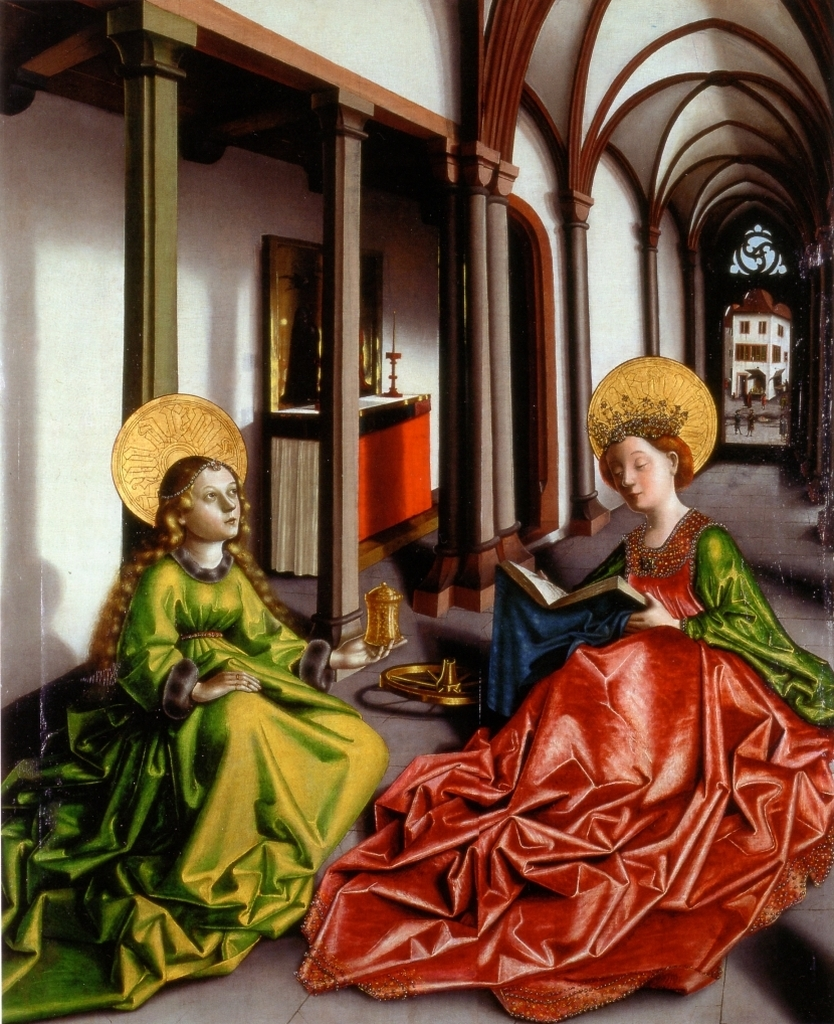
Saints Catherine and Mary Magdalene, Konrad Witz, c. 1440

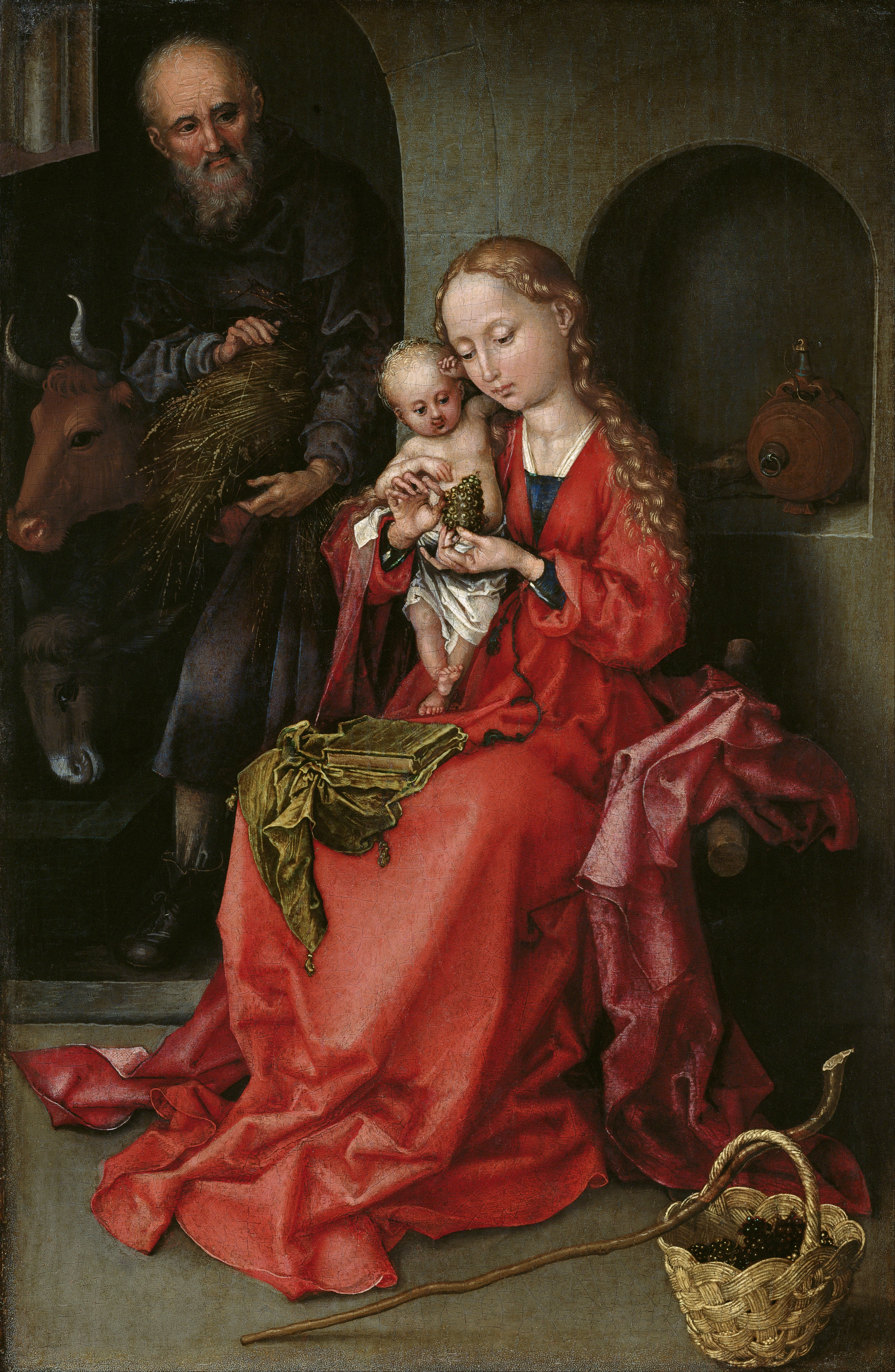
Martin Schongauer, The Holy Family

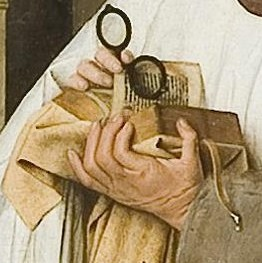
Jan van Eyck's Madonna with Canon van der Paele

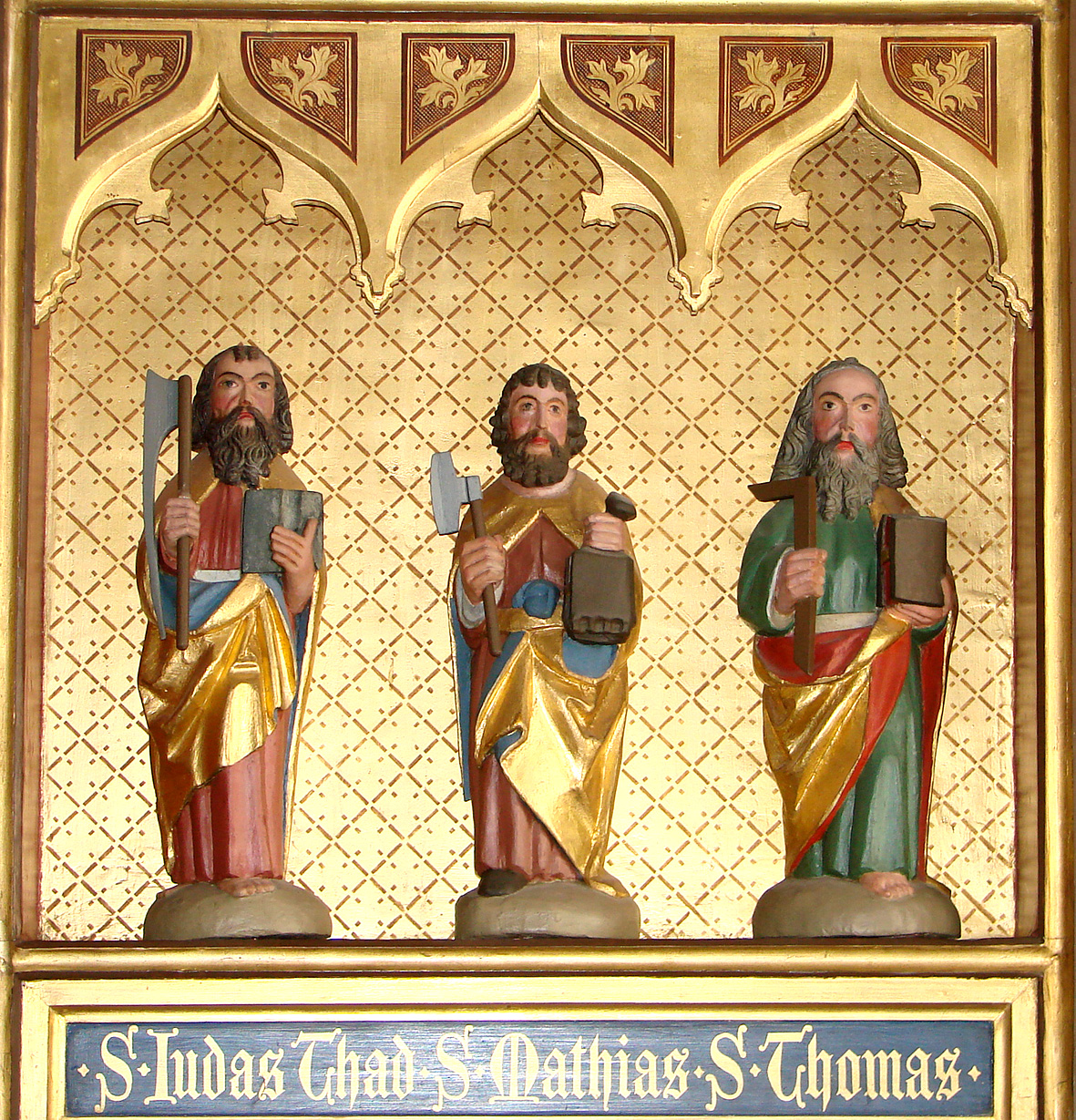
Apostles on a Danish altarpiece

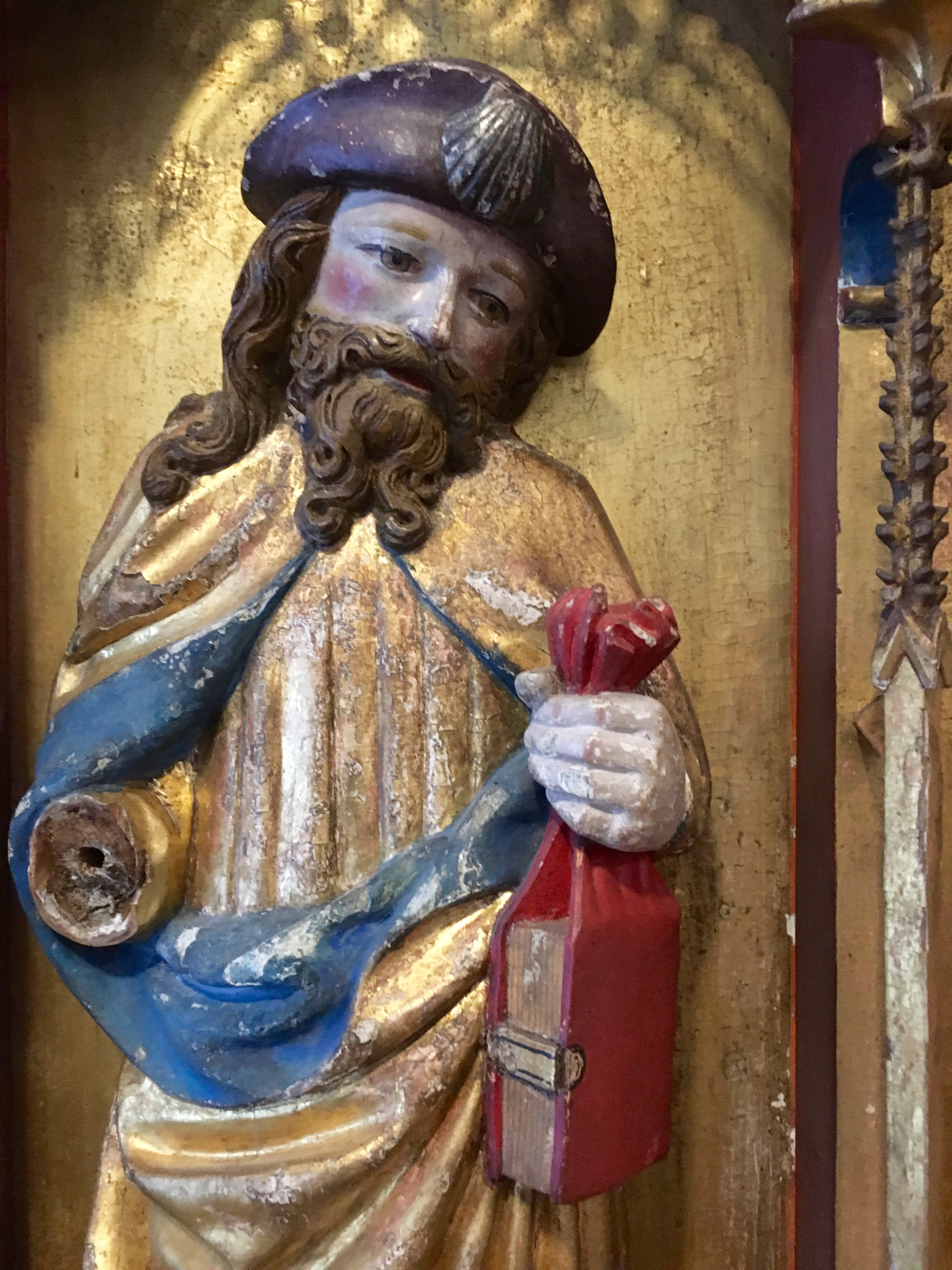
Another Danish apostle

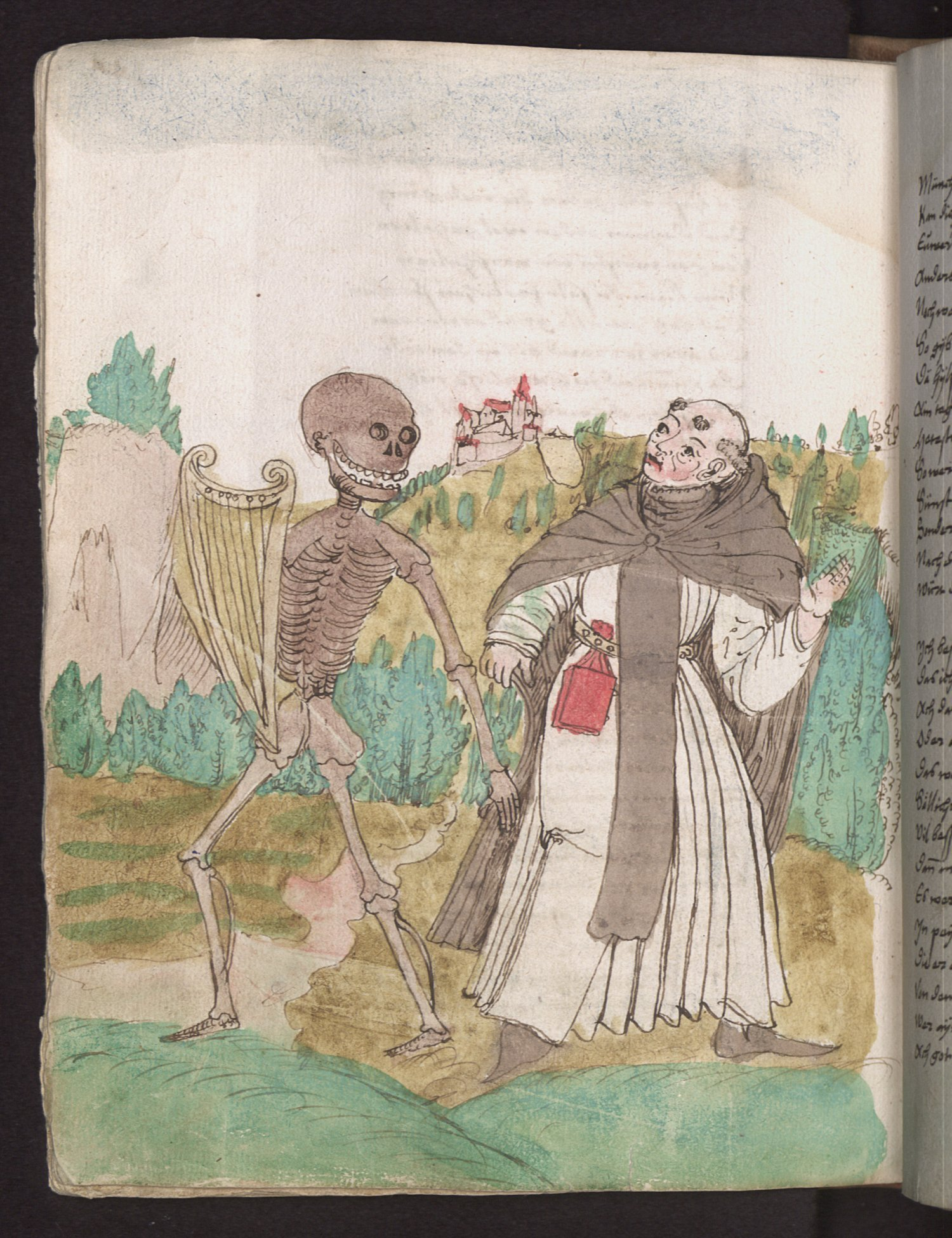
Totentanz, Death comes for a monk, with a book in his belt.

== Construction ==
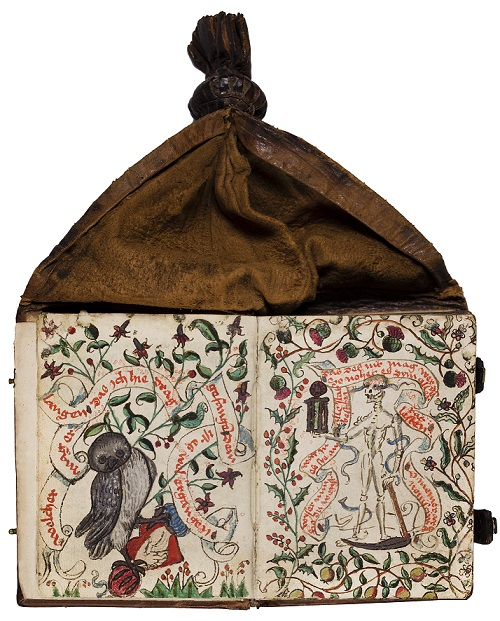
German lady's girdle book of 1540

Girdle books were a variant on other forms of medieval book-binding in which the leather or cloth continued loose beyond the edges of the hard cover. Especially for small personal books like the Book of Hours, the leather often extended sideways, which gave extra protection for the book when not in use. The loose edges could be wrapped round, and often buckles or laces enabled the book to be securely closed. In addition, when reading, the book could be held from outside the cover, so that the clean inside surface of the leather, rather than the thumbs of the reader, touched the pages. This stopped the pages acquiring the dirty patches in the lower margins that many medieval books have. These too are often shown in art, although it is noticeable that readers are often not making full use of the protective way of holding the book.

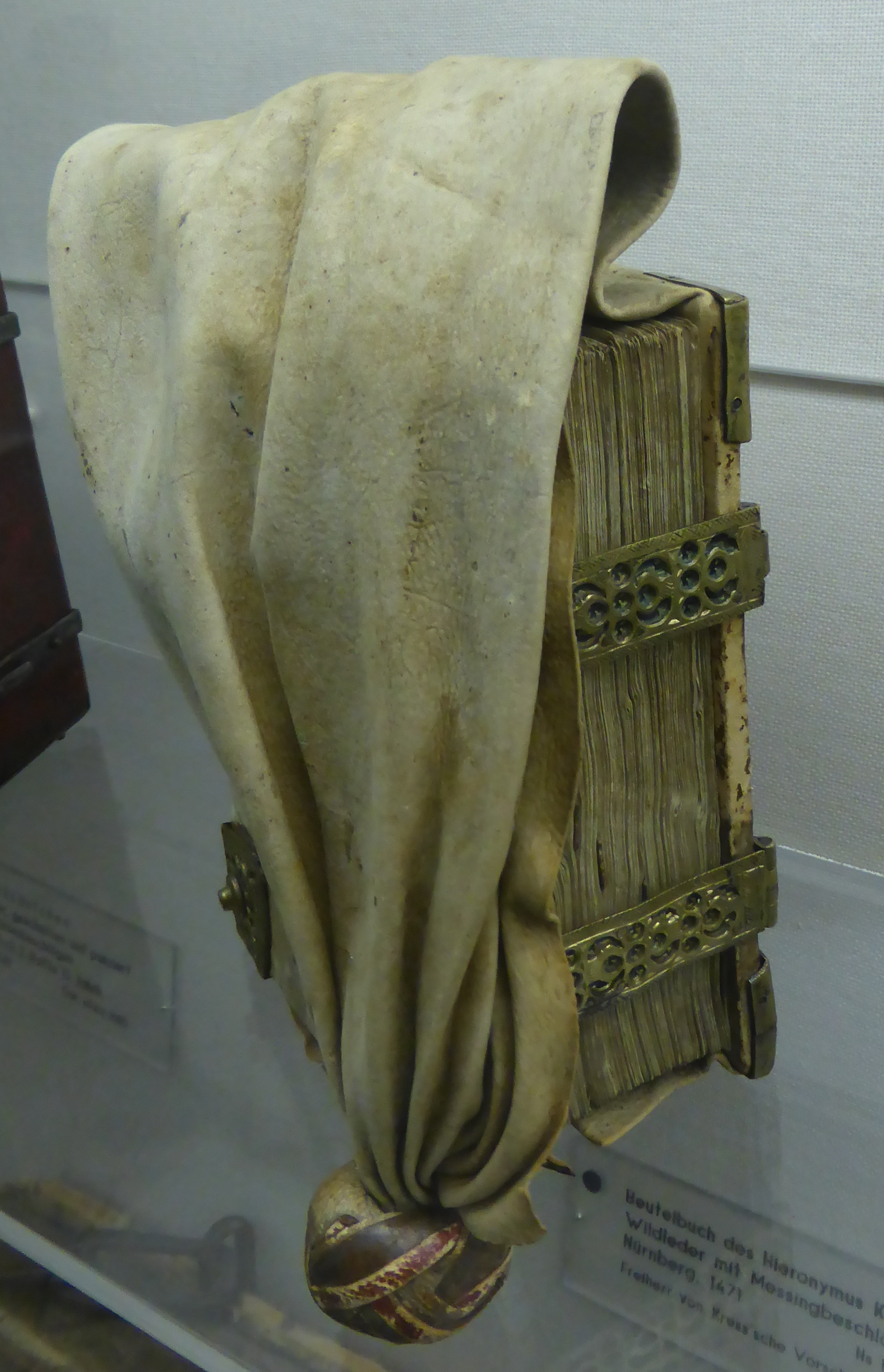
A girdle book from Nuremberg from 1471

The knot used for the handle was a Turk's head knot, so named for similar appearance to the turbans worn by medieval Muslims of the Ottoman Empire. Sometimes the girdle book had a hook that fastened to the belt; "a hinge connected the hook to the flap of the binding, allowing maximal movement of the book while it was still attached."

Many girdle books were unadorned; however, there are also many that have brass corner pieces, carvings, awl punctures, artisan clasps, and possibly a family crest or other mark on the front. Given the security afforded by carrying the book around, it was less risky to add decoration and gilding to a book less easily stolen than a shelved manuscript. Additionally, ornate metal clasps and hinges were more durable than woven leather or cloth bindings that wore out more quickly from heavy use.

== Variations ==
Although not strictly girdle books, several other types of portable books were in use during the same time period. Some larger books had rings attached to the standard binding so a cord could be slipped through them and wrapped around the waist. Other books were small enough that they could be worn around the neck. A small chain looped through a ring or two at the top of the binding was all that was necessary to make it portable. Finally, a fourth type of portable book was the vade mecum (go with me), consisting of a booklet or folded sheets that contained an almanac or medical information and could be suspended from a belt. The text on a vade mecum would be arranged in such a way as to be legible as someone unfolded the parchment, rather than having to constantly reorient the sheets.

According to The Medieval Girdle Book Project:

Containers and protective enclosures for books have been in use since long before the Middle Ages; the clay pots housing the Dead Sea Scrolls come to mind as do the leather cylinders used to store scrolls and clay tablets in the library at Alexandria and others, and the cumdachs used by Irish monks to carry their precious manuscripts and prayer books from place to place, possibly even to Iceland, which they reached as early as 700 AD.

== Lack of literature ==
Despite their significant representation in art depicting medieval clergy, there is a scarcity of literature outside of small communities seeking to recreate them. A wide variety of craft books cover the creation of modern girdle books. Many amateur historians have created more technical overviews of "historically accurate" girdle books. However, being such a specialized technique, the girdle book lacks the attention given to more popular medieval binding methods in the enthusiast community

Notable exceptions are the collaboration between Margit Smith of the University of San Diego and Jim Bloxam of Cambridge University Library and Smith's monograph. Their project seeks to "[bring] the girdle book to the attention of professionals working with books as librarians, curators, teachers, book dealers and collectors, and hand bookbinders, may increase appreciation of a book format, which, though small in size, has some importance, but is now almost forgotten."

Also, many more books were bound not as girdle books but as similarly protected chemise covered books. Chemise covered books were often larger and designed for comfortable, stationary reading.

== See also ==
- Cumdach
- Vade mecum
