= Van Valckenborch =

Van Valckenborch was a Flemish family of painters active in the late 16th and early 17th century. Notable members of the family include:

- Frederik van Valckenborch
- Gillis van Valckenborch (1570–1622)
- Marten van Valckenborch (1535–1612)
- Lucas van Valckenborch
