= Frederik van Valckenborch =

Flemish painter (1566–1623)

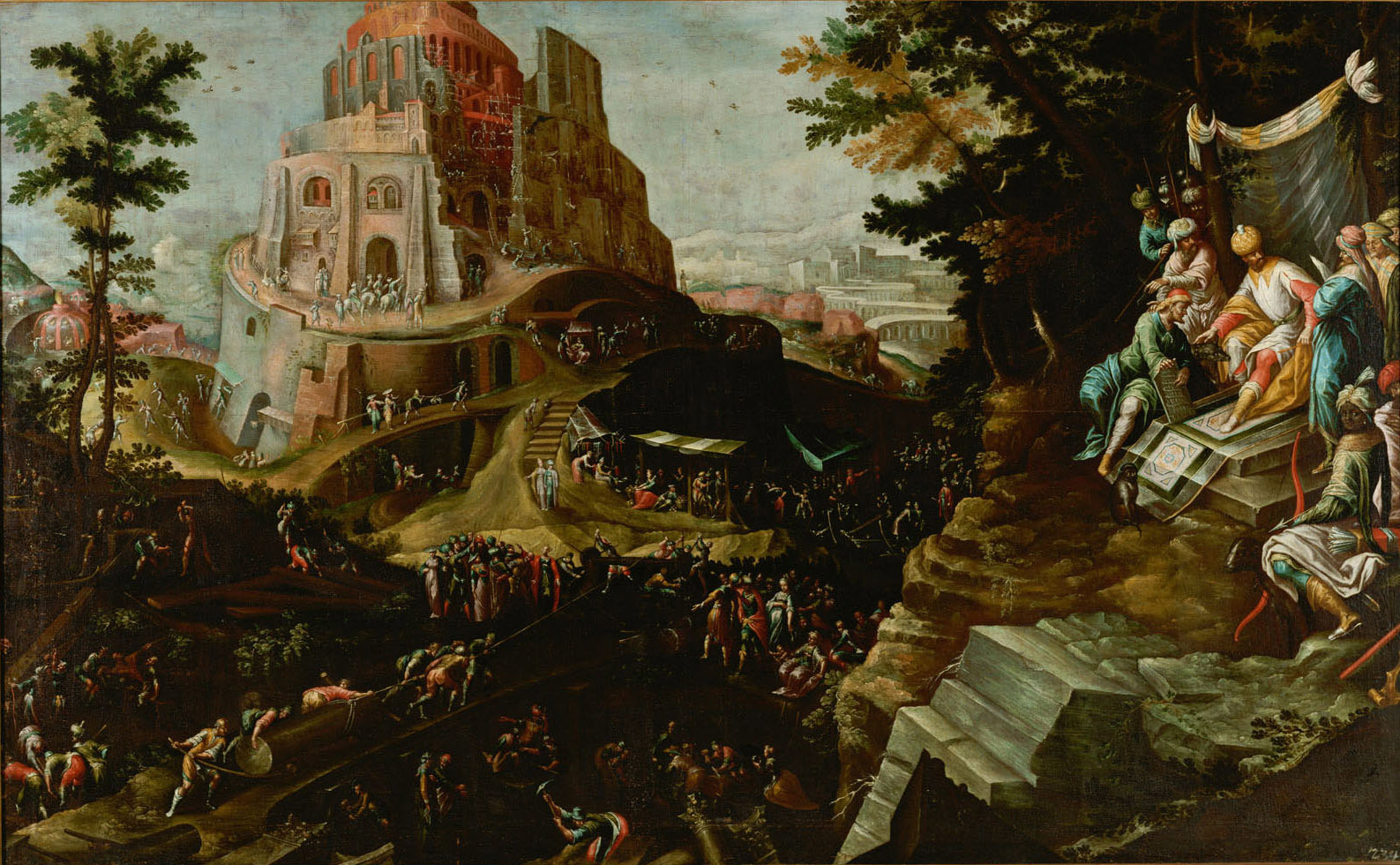
The construction of the Tower of Babel

Frederik van Valckenborch (1566 in Antwerp – 1623 in Nuremberg) was a Flemish painter and draughtsman known for his imaginary landscapes with figures executed in a late Mannerist style. His drawings are more realistic and demonstrate an impulse towards topographical accuracy. He was active mainly in Germany.

== Life ==
Van Valckenborch was born into a well-known family of artists. Fourteen known painters are recorded in the family history. Of these, Frederik's father Marten van Valckenborch (1535–1612), his brother Gillis van Valckenborch and his uncle Lucas van Valckenborch achieved notable fame. The van Valckenborch family was particularly known in the Spanish Netherlands for landscape painting.

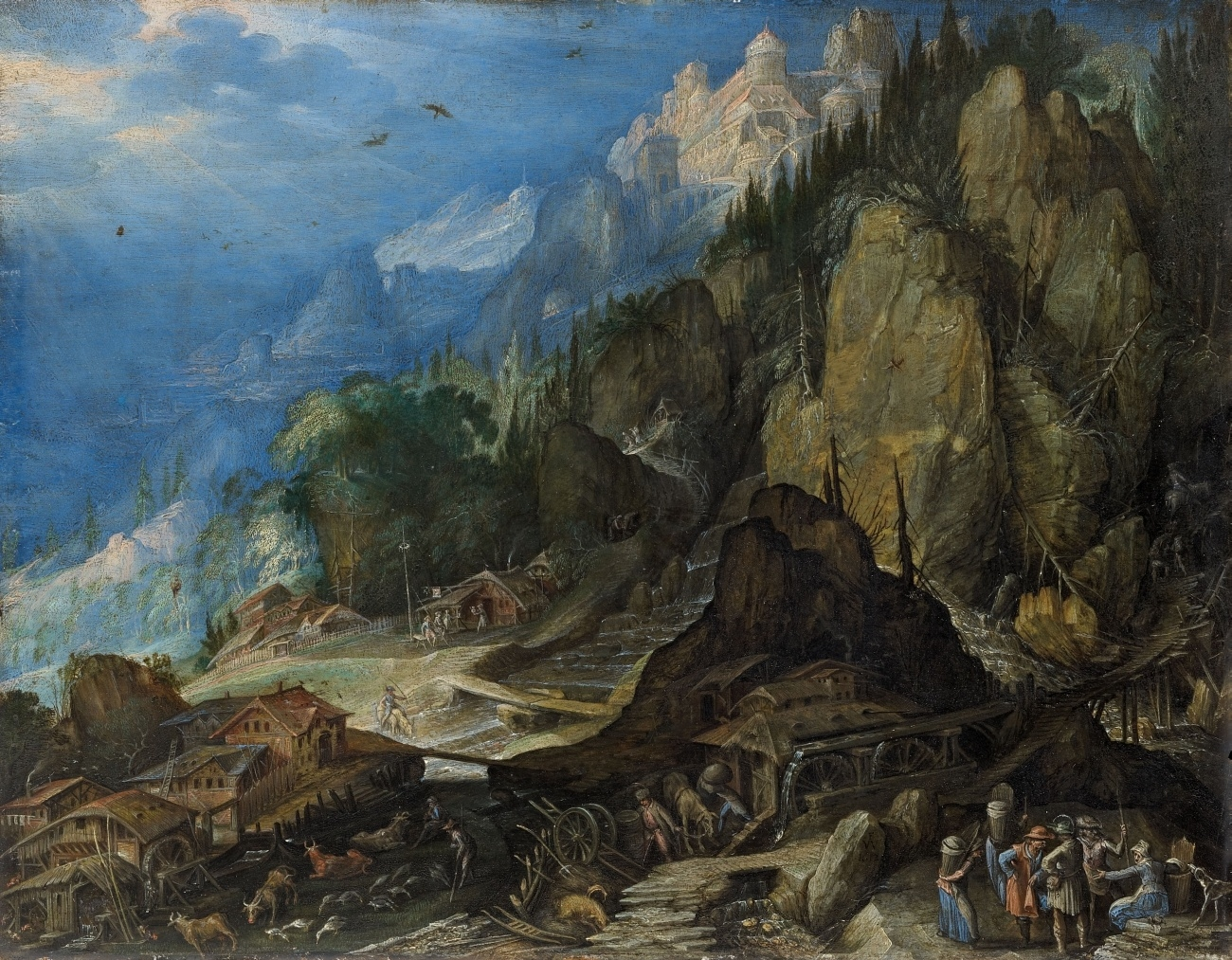
Mountain landscape with two watermills

Frederik van Valckenborch received his earliest training in Antwerp. It is believed that his first teacher was his father. He may, in addition, have trained with an Antwerp figure painter. Two of his drawings, The Deluge (1588) and Moses Drawing Water from the Rocks (1589), have figures that do not bear any resemblance to his father's works. It has been deduced from this fact that although Frederik learned landscape painting from his father, he was taught figure painting by another teacher, possibly Jacob de Backer.

Originally from Leuven, the van Valckenborchs, like many other families in the region who had become Calvinists, moved from the Spanish-occupied Spanish Netherlands to the more liberal environment of Frankfurt am Main, which was a German imperial outpost. The van Valckenborchs thrived in their new home town, quickly establishing themselves as authorities in the arts. They had an important influence on the artistic developments in Frankfurt am Main.

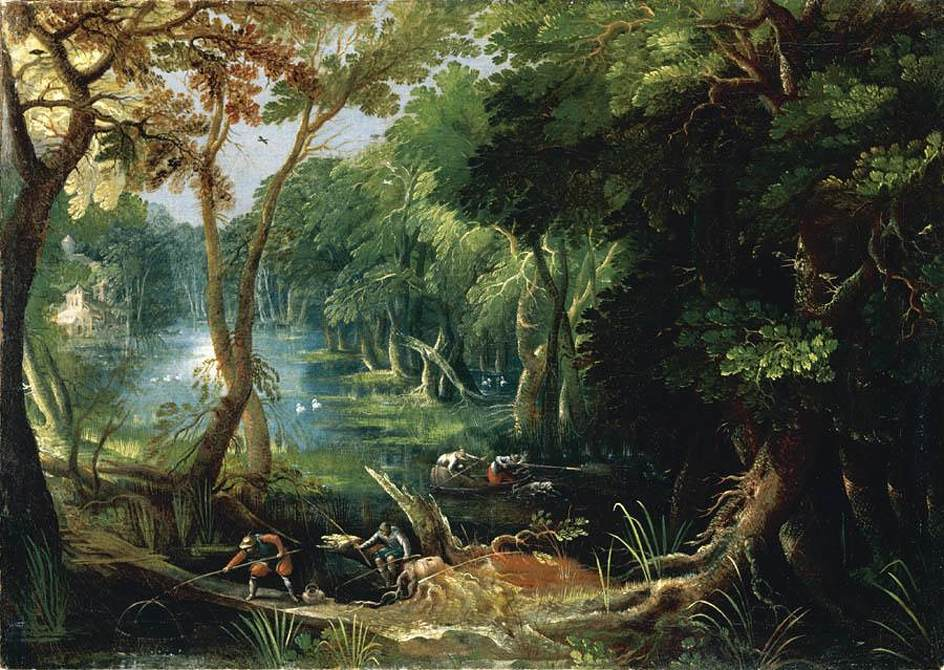
Wooded river landscape

It is believed Frederik and his brother Gillis travelled to Italy in 1590–1592, although there is no evidence for this trip other than a drawing of an Italian landscape by Gillis. Frederik returned to Frankfurt am Main, where he became a citizen on 24 February 1597. He may have married in 1597 since on 23 April 1598 twin sons, Frederik and Wilhelm, were baptized in Frankfurt. He had two more sons who became painters: Moritz (baptised on 17 Aug 1600) and Nicolaus (born around 1603). In the period 1598-1599 he travelled through Bavaria, Tyrol, Salzkammergut and Vienna.

Frederik moved to Nuremberg in 1602. Here he received in 1607 a commission from Archduke Maximilian to make a copy of Albrecht Dürer’s Assumption of the Virgin. It took him six months to complete the commission in which he was assisted by the local painter Paul Juvenel. Valckenborch was regarded as an important Dürer scholar and owned a collection of works by Dürer. From 1610 to 1623 he was appointed to the Grand Council of the city of Nuremberg. Frederik received in 1612 a commission from the Nuremberg authorities to design an arch for the Triumphal Entry of Archduke Matthias.

== Work ==
Like the rest of his family, Frederik van Valckenborch is mainly known for landscapes with figures. Only a small number of paintings signed or monogrammed by Frederik van Valkenborch are known. He worked in a late Mannerist idiom characterised by strong contrasts between light and dark and the use of animated forms that lend a dynamic, if somewhat haunting and even surrealist, quality to the whole.

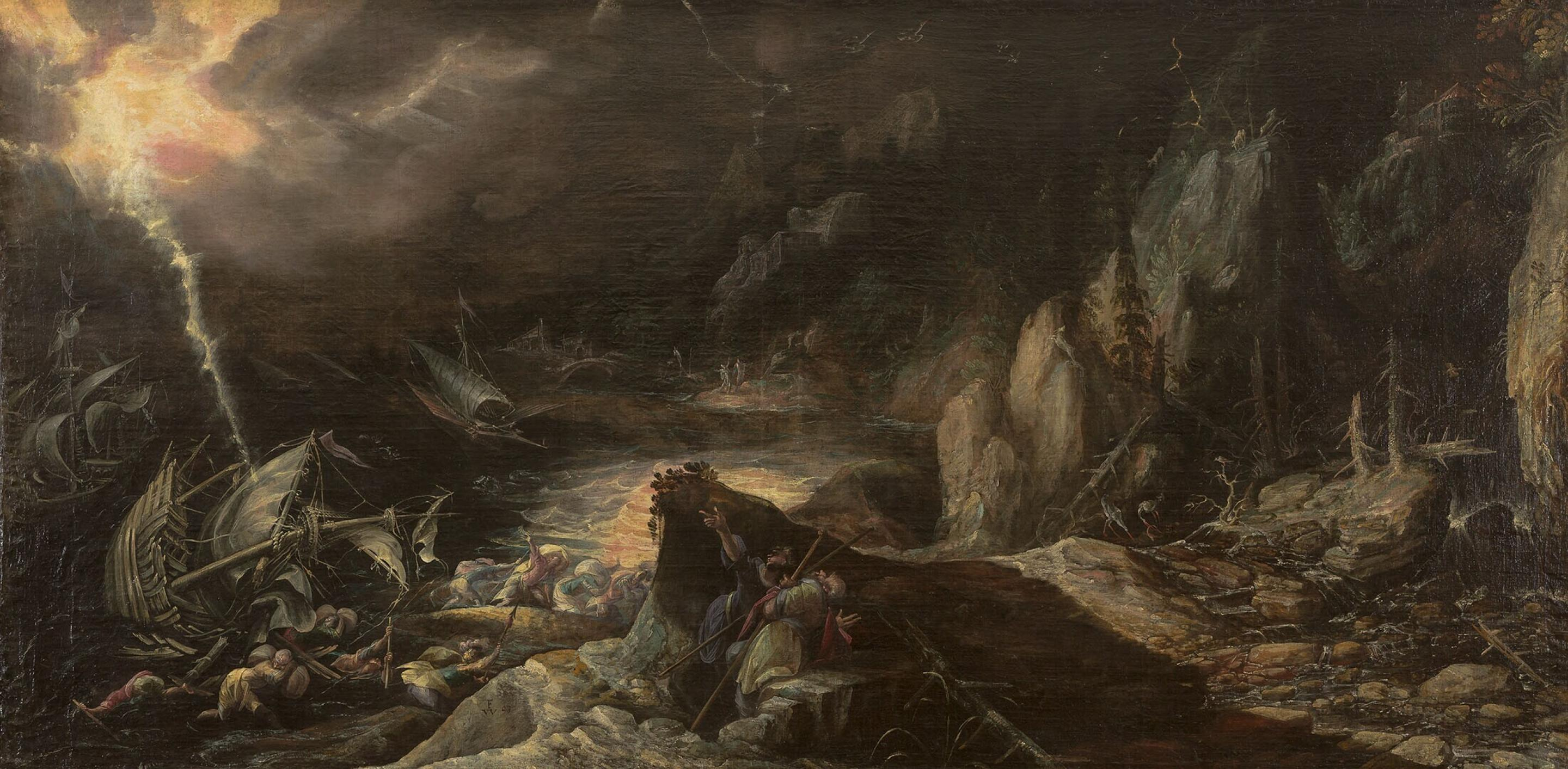
Landscape with a shipwreck

His main influence, next to his father, was probably Gillis van Coninxloo (1544 - 1607). It is likely that during his presumed stay in Italy, he was influenced by his compatriots living in Venice such as Pauwels Franck (1540-1596, called "Paolo Fiammingo") and Lodewijk Toeput (c. 1550 - c. 1605, called "Pozzoserrato").

In the composition Landscape with shipwreck (Museum Boymans van Beuningen) the influence of the Venetians such as Tintoretto is visible in the dramatic use of light contrasts. The dramatic use of light and the effect of lightning appear to be the main concerns of the artist.

In his drawings van Valckenborck shows an interest in the realistic rendering of nature, something which is generally absent from his paintings. In his quest for topographical accuracy he created drawings with a clear and simple layout in contrast with his complex paintings.
