= Lodewijk Toeput =

Flemish landscape painter

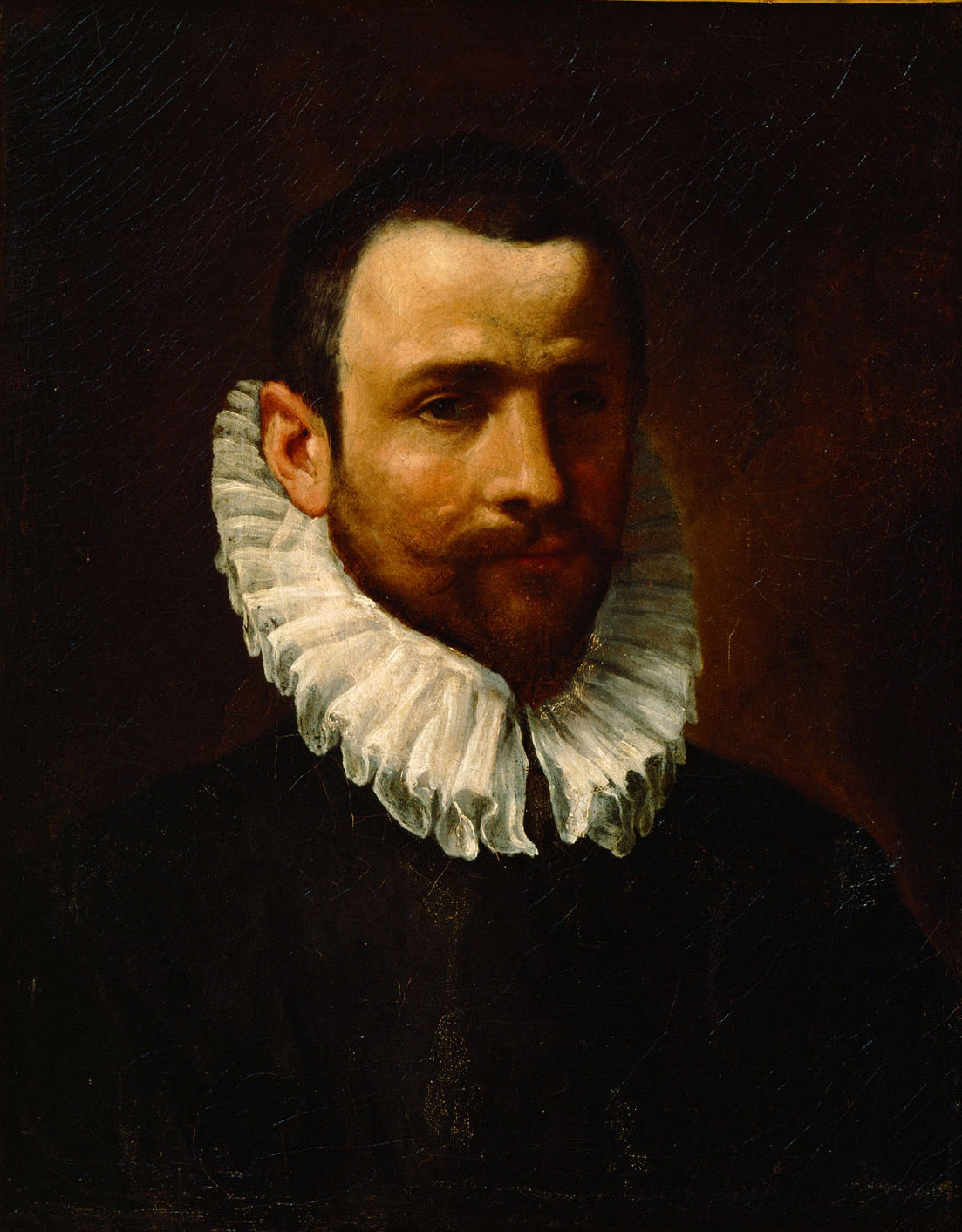
Portrait of Lodewijk Toeput by Hans von Aachen

Lodewijk Toeput, called il Pozzoserrato (c. 1540/1550 – between 1603 and 1605) was a Flemish landscape painter and draftsman active in Italy. He is mainly known for his canvases and frescoes of landscapes and formal gardens with banquets and music-making groups. His landscapes had an important influence on the next generation of Flemish landscape artists such as Joos de Momper, Tobias Verhaecht and Gillis and Frederik van Valckenborch.

== Life ==
The early life of Lodewijk Toeput in his native Flanders is not documented and the date and place of his birth are not known with certainty. The late 16th century biographer Karel van Mander who claimed to have met Toeput in Venice, placed Toeput's birthplace in Mechelen. While many contemporary art historians tend to identify his birthplace as Antwerp there is still no consensus view. In Antwerp he is believed to have studied with Maerten de Vos, a leading history painter who had studied in Italy.

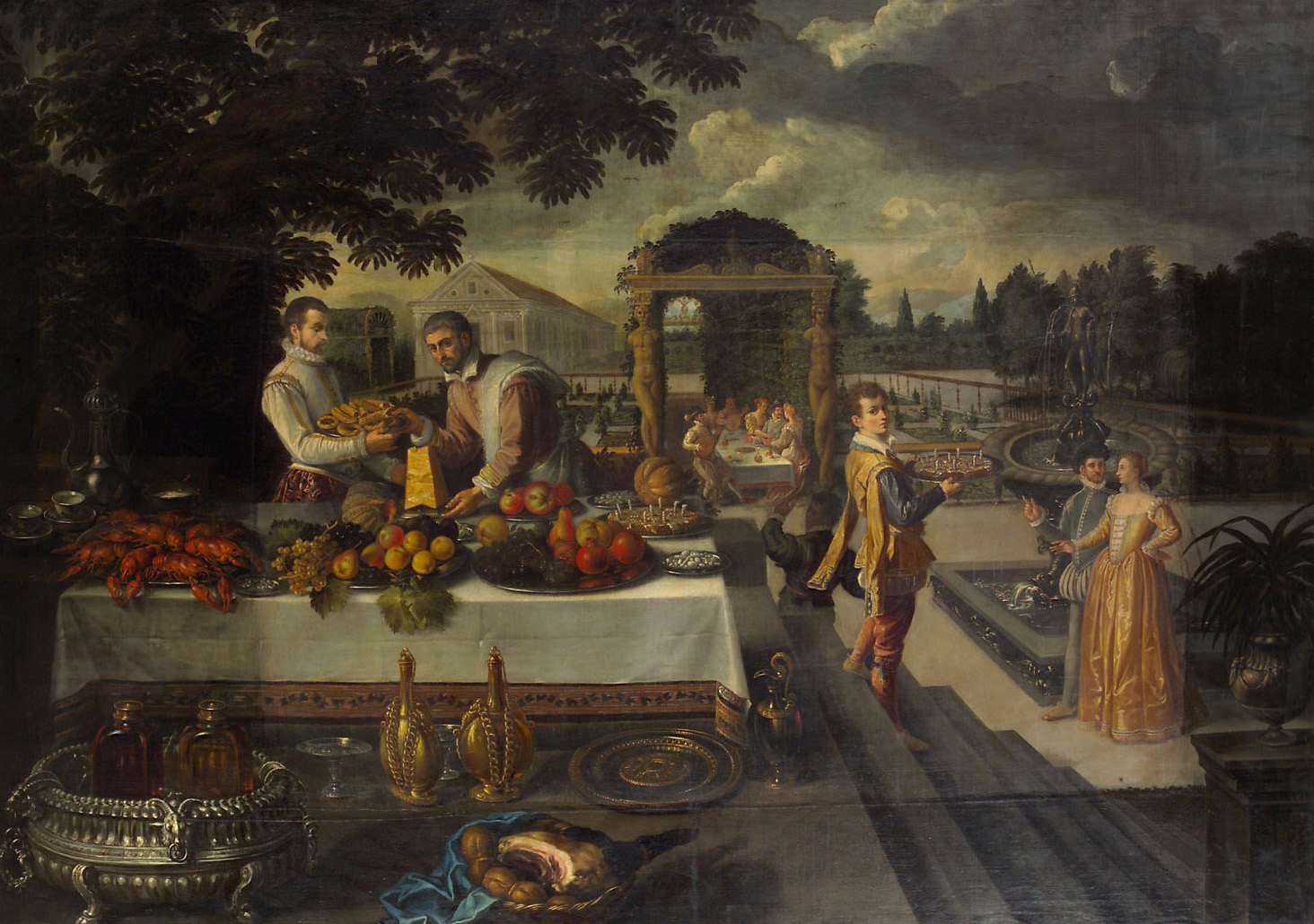
Banquet in the Park

While the date of his departure from his home country is not documented, it is believed the artist arrived around 1573–74 in Venice. According to Carlo Ridolfi's Le maraviglie dell'Arte (1648), Toeput initially worked in the studio of Tintoretto. Here he likely was in contact with his fellow countryman Paolo Fiammingo (Pauwels Franck), who was also residing and working in Venice. The artists may actually have met in Tintoretto's workshop.

Toeput is recorded in Florence in the late 1570s. A stay in Rome is not documented, but it is believed on the basis of drawings of ancient Roman churches that at the beginning of the 1580s Toeput stayed in this city. He then probably resided in Venice for a brief period but was documented in February 1582 in Treviso, near Venice, where he lived and worked for the rest of his life. It is possible that the artist moved from Venice to Treviso because the Venetian painter's guild did not grant him membership and thus the right to work in Venice. Despite his residence in Treviso, Toeput kept in touch with Venice where he met with artistic personalities such as Jacopo Bassano, Hans von Aachen, members of the Sadeler family, Otto van Veen and Pieter de Jode I.

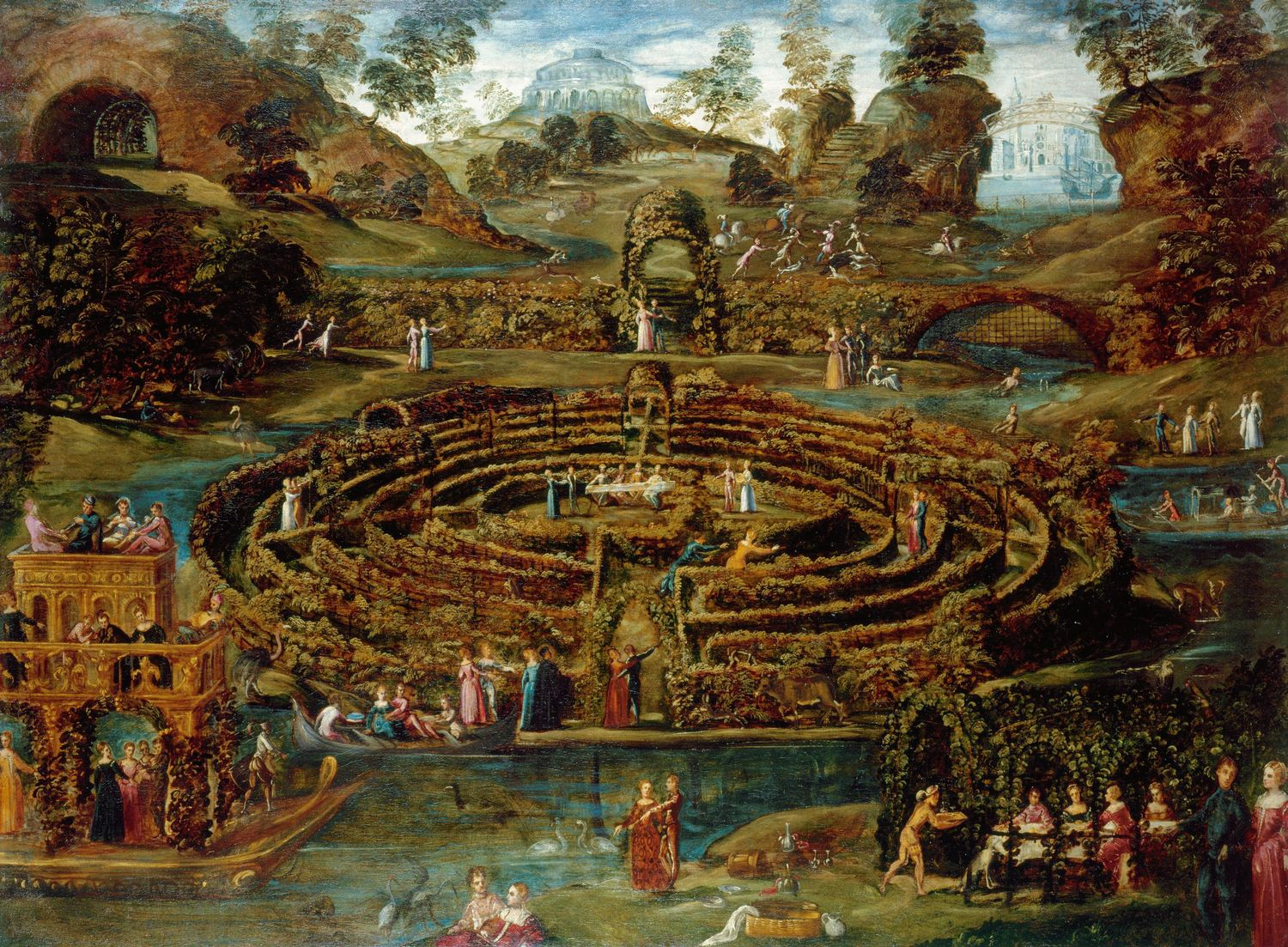
Pleasure garden with a maze

In Treviso there was at the time a high demand by religious and civilian patrons for artwork. One important assignment was for decorations for the Monte di Pietà, a communal pawnshop, for which Toeput created frescos of scenes from the Old and New Testament and parables alluding to the works of mercy. The artist married Laudamia Aproino in 1601 in Treviso. In Italy, the painter was known as Ludovico Pozzoserrato, the literal translation into Italian of his Flemish name Toeput which can be read to mean ‘'Closed Well'’. After he established his residence in Treviso, the artist referred to himself as Lodovico Pozzo da Trevigi.

He died in Treviso some time between 1 January 1604 and 9 September 1605.

== Work ==
Toeput painted frescoes, altarpieces and paintings with Biblical scenes, landscapes, city views and genre scenes of Venetian social life depicting formal gardens with banquets and music-making groups. He painted several historical allegories from the Bible and mythological themes from the Metamorphoses. He made many religious paintings for the Venetian churches. Toeput was principally known for his landscape frescoes and canvases, which combine Flemish and Venetian styles. These landscapes typically depict spacious vistas, full of atmospheric and picturesque effects. His paintings and frescoes can be found in situ in various Italian cities such as Padua, Treviso and Conegliano.

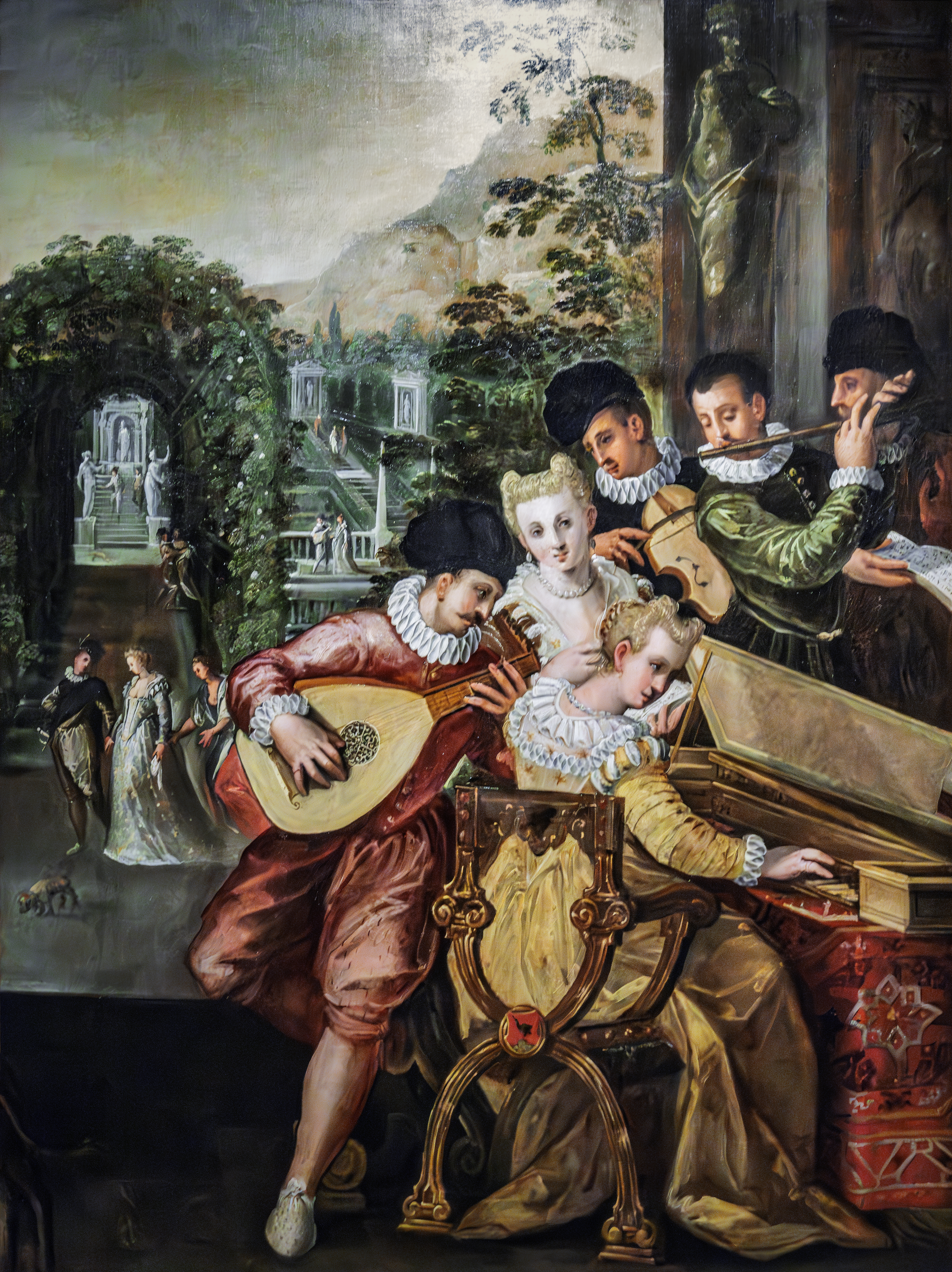
Concert in a villa courtyard

Toeput is also known for his allegorical compositions. In the frescoes of the Villa Chiericati-Mugna, executed between 1587 and 1590, he developed a series of allegorical landscapes, which represent the months of the year, each recognizable by their astrological sign. The series is complemented by a trompe-l'œil of a door that reveals a page with a dog, a painting above the fireplace with Apollo holding a lyre and friezes containing mythological figures along the walls. Toeput left various drawings representing the seasons and months of the year. The Allegory of Spring and Allegory of Winter in the collection of the Yale University Art Gallery likely inspired Joos de Momper's own treatment of this subject.

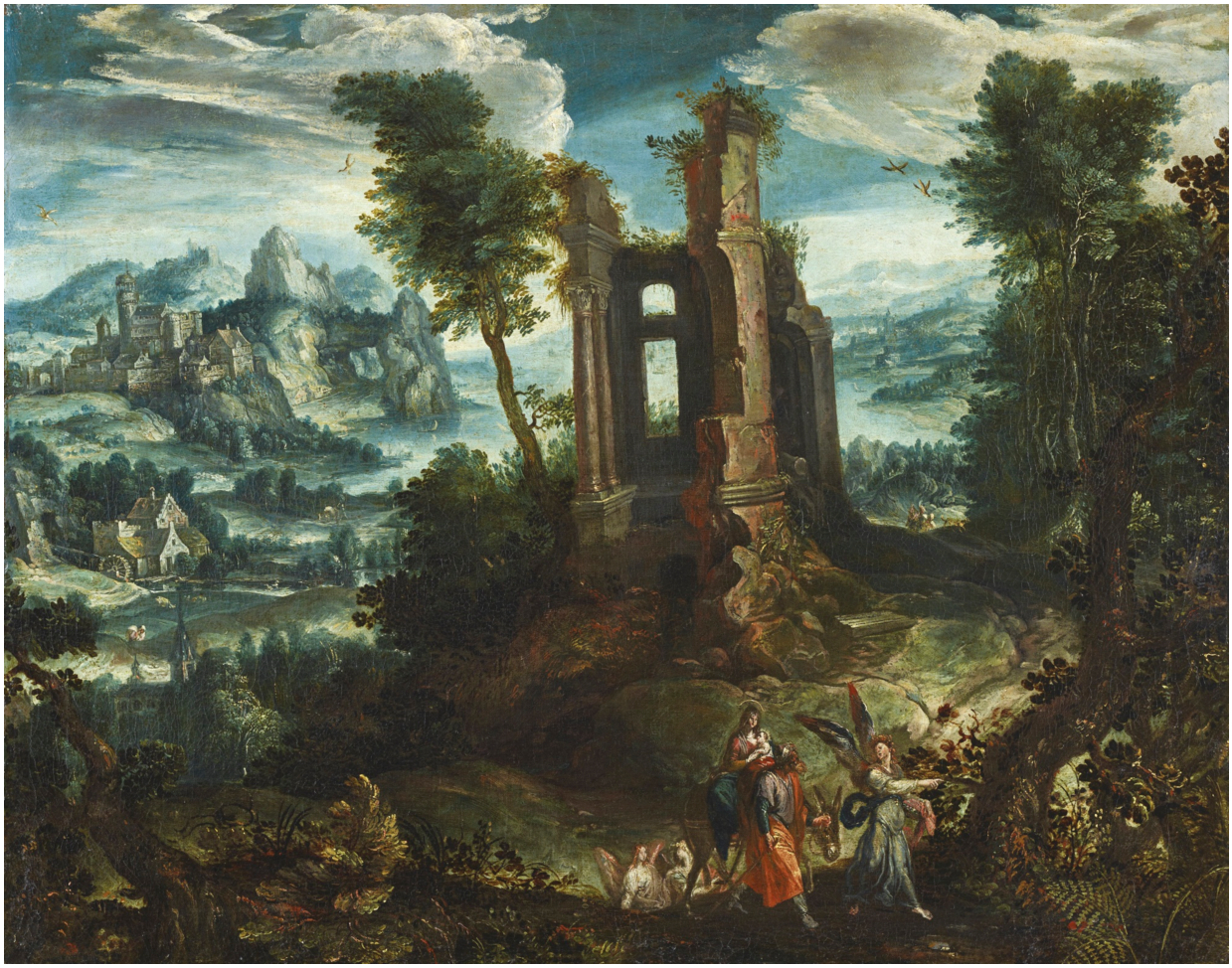
The flight into Egypt

Toeput painted various elegant gardens with figures engaging in courtly love or concerts. Many of his garden scenes were likely inspired by contemporary Flemish prints. For instance, his Pleasure garden with a maze (Hampton Court Palace) was likely inspired by the Garden with labyrinth by Hans Vredeman de Vries and Party in a garden, both engraved by Pieter van der Borcht the Elder. Toeput's best known garden scene Concert in a villa courtyard Musei civici di Treviso) appears to draw inspiration from Crispijn van de Passe the Elder's engraving of Adolescentia Amori after a design by Toeput's presumed master Maerten de Vos.

Toeput's earliest known drawing, Lot and his daughters, dates from 1573 (Städel). It shows his closeness to his presumed master Maerten de Vos. The influence of his Venetian master Tintoretto is also palpable. This work and other works by Toeput are also close to, and have often been confused with, those of his Flemish compatriot Paolo Fiammingo (Pauwels Franck) who also resided in Venice at the same time. Toeput drew many biblical and mythological scenes, but was primarily a draftsman of cityscapes and panoramic landscapes.

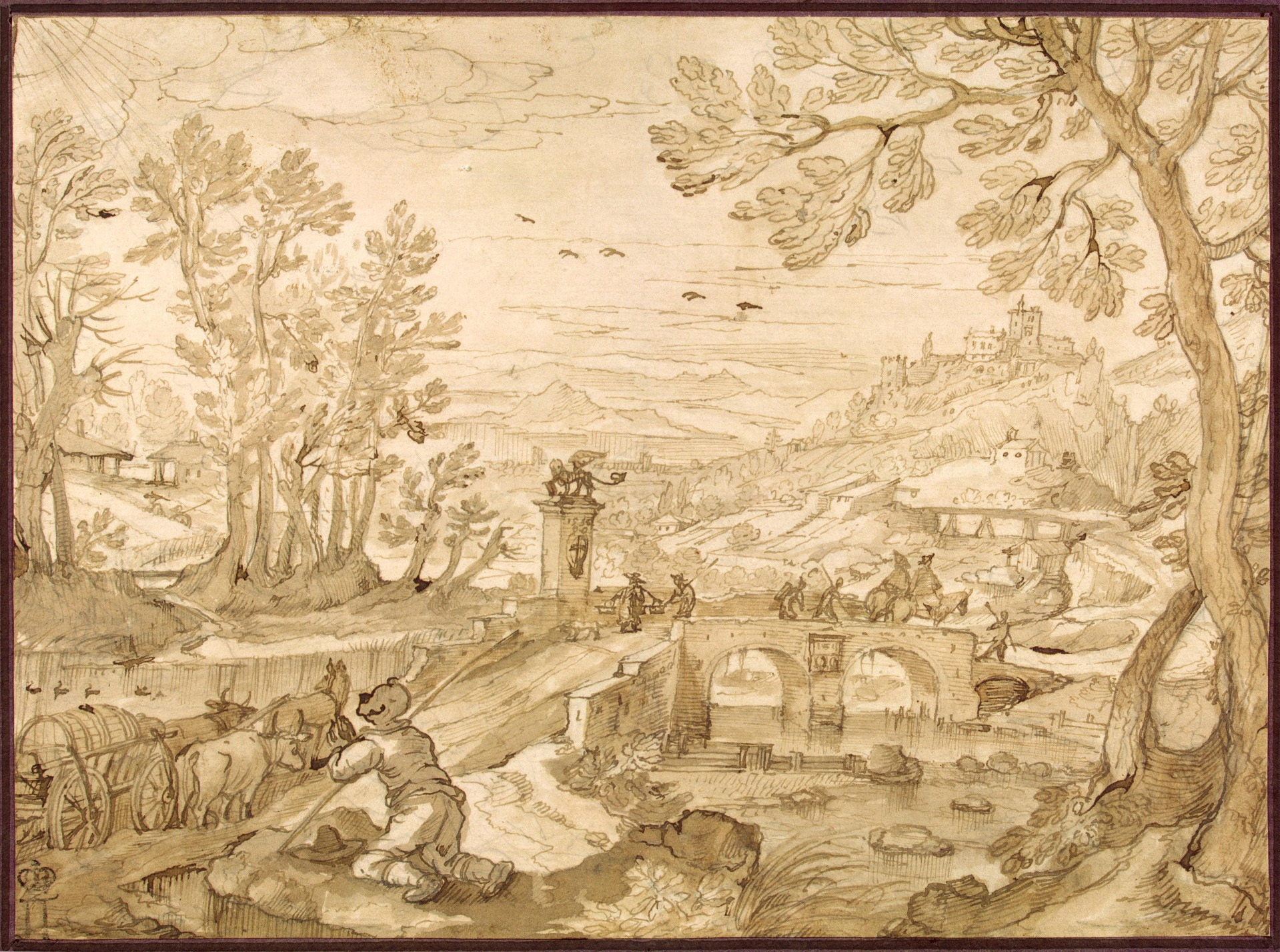
Landscape with Heracles and the Ox-Driver

Toeput's drawings show his interest in topography. His Panorama of Treviso and View of Aquapendente were engraved and included in volume V (1598) of Georg Braun and Frans Hogenberg's six-volume atlas, the Civitates orbis terrarum (Cologne, 1572–1618). He also created imaginary landscapes, such as the Landscape with St John on Patmos (New York, Pierpont Morgan Library), showing his characteristic trees with windswept foliage framing a finely detailed panorama depicted from a high viewpoint. Many of his drawings depict landscapes including urban views and often feature bridges. Usually, cities and landscapes occupy most of the space while the human figures are of small scale. The cities are typically characterized by high towers. The landscapes are mountainous and suggest distance. He often placed an object such as a tree on the left or right side of his drawings in order to link the front and back of the composition. An example is the Landscape with Heracles and the Ox-Driver (Hermitage. Moscow). His urban views recall those of the Venetian Domenico Campagnola.

Toeput was in demand as a designer of prints. Flemish engravers who travelled through Venice such as Rafael I Sadeler would engrave after his existing designs or order new designs from him.
