= Paul Juvenel the Elder =

German painter (1579–1643)

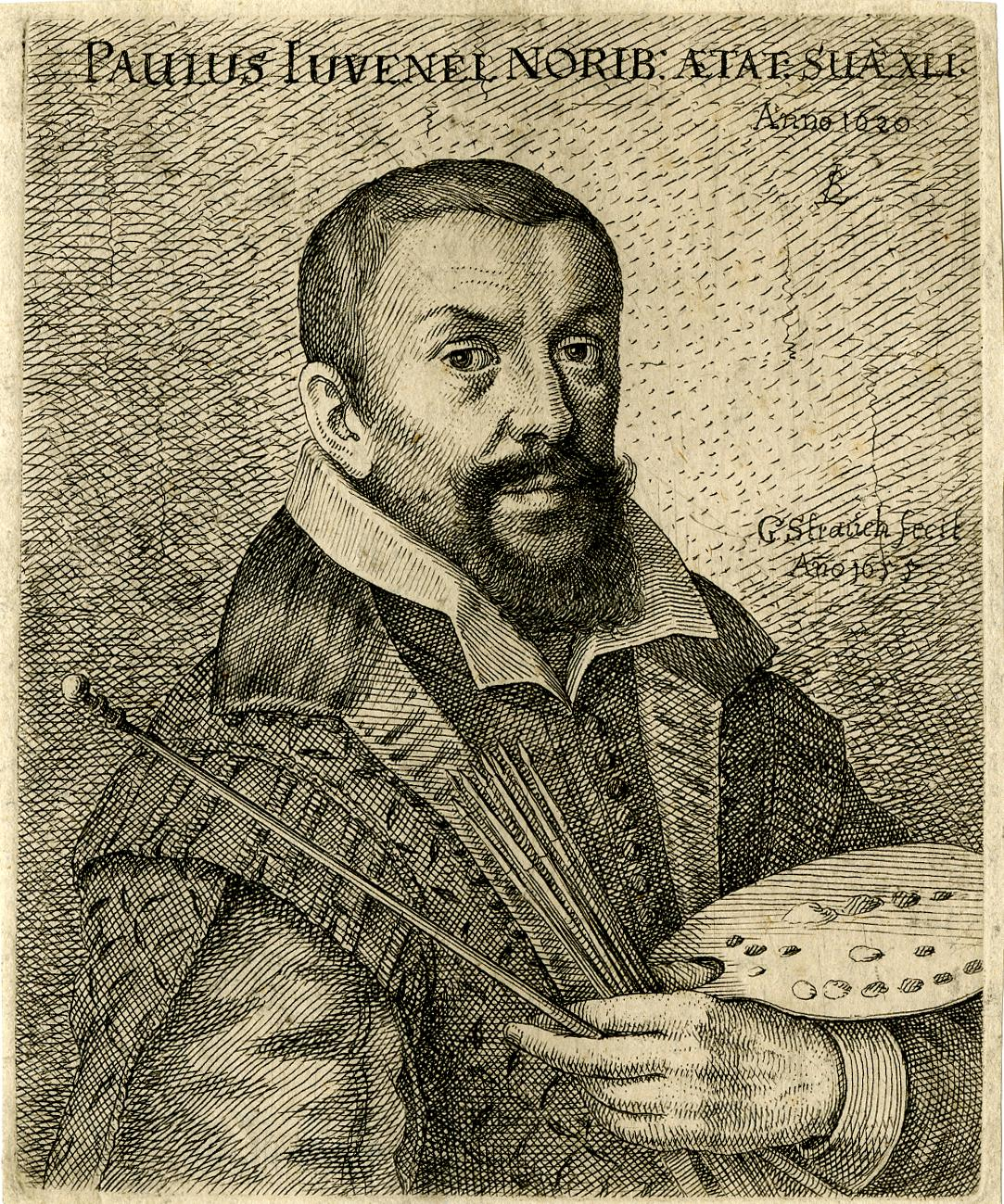
Paul Juvenel, etching by Georg Strauch, 1655

Paul Juvenel the Elder (1579–1643) was a German painter.

== Biography ==
He was born in Nuremberg in December 1579, into a family of Flemish origin. His father, Nicolas Juvenel I was born in Dunkirk, Flanders, and between 1550 and 1554 worked on the decoration of the castles of Mariemont and Binche, both of which were destroyed in 1554.

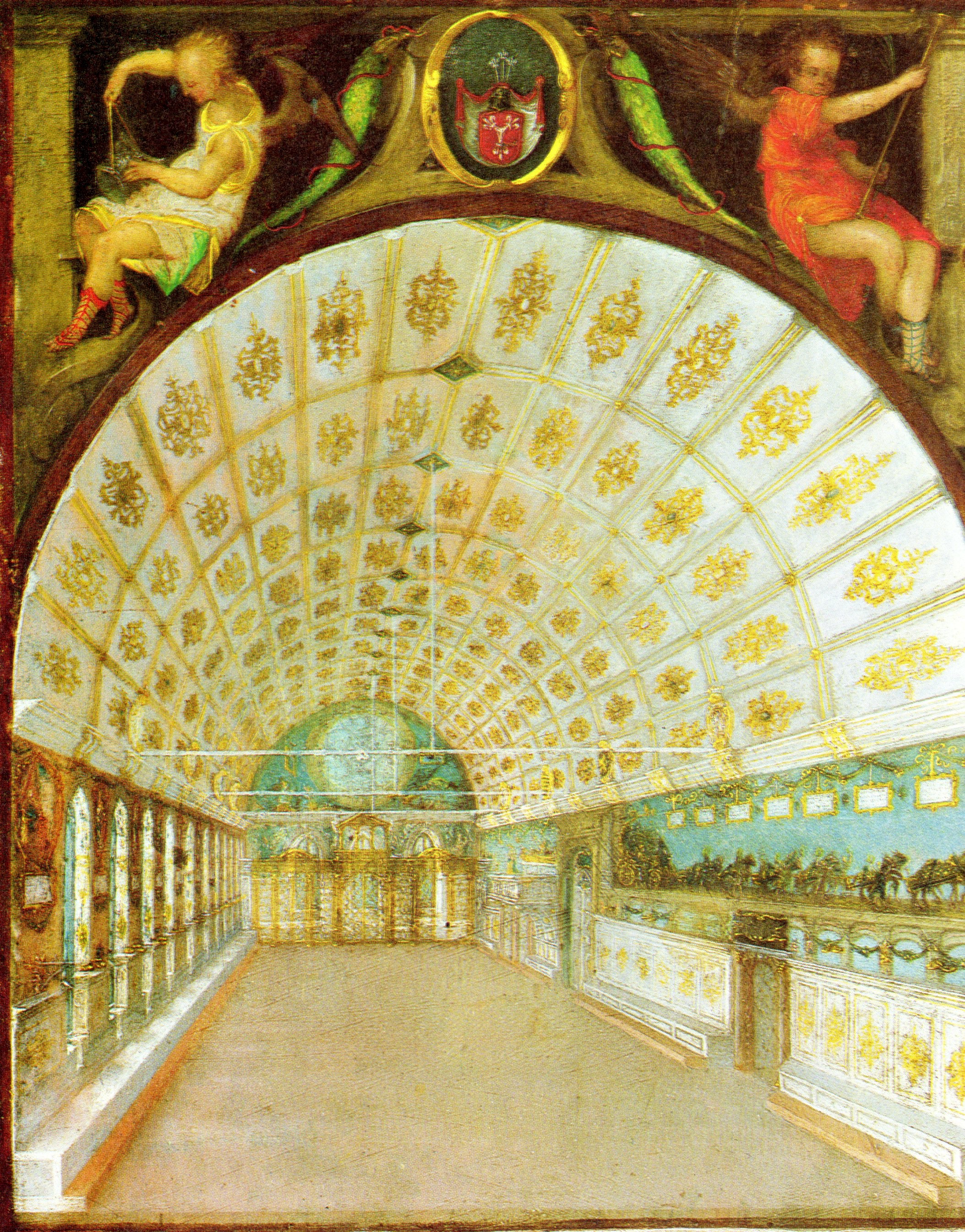
Großer Saal (Old Town Hall of Nuremberg) perspective interior view, painting by Paul Juvenel (1622)

His father fled religious persecution as a Calvinist to Kassel. Here, the future landgrave of Hesse-Kassel William IV advised him to go to Nuremberg, which he reached in 1561 with other refugees from the Netherlands.

At first Paul was a student of his father Nicolas and then continued his training under Adam Elsheimer in Frankfurt.

Juvenel worked, among other things, as a church painter, e.g. in Heroldsberg in the church of St. Matthew. There he designed the altar wings. They show paradise with the fall of man and the elevation of Nehushtan by Moses.

He completed a painting of the Last Supper begun by his teacher Adam Adelsheimer (died in 1620 in Rome), adding in 1621 the architecture and the background.

He also designed 13 ceiling paintings in the hall of the Nuremberg town hall, which depict the emperor surrounded by virtues or scenes from Roman history.

Other works include portraits of emperors Ferdinand II, Matthias, Rudolf II and the Rex Romanorum Rudolf I. These portraits also hang in the Nuremberg town hall.

Juvenel made copies of Dürer's Assumption of Mary and scenes from the life of Mary, based on woodcuts by Dürer.

Juvenel moved to Vienna in 1638 and from there to Bratislava, where he died in 1643.

His four children, three boys and a girl, also became painters.

== Gallery ==
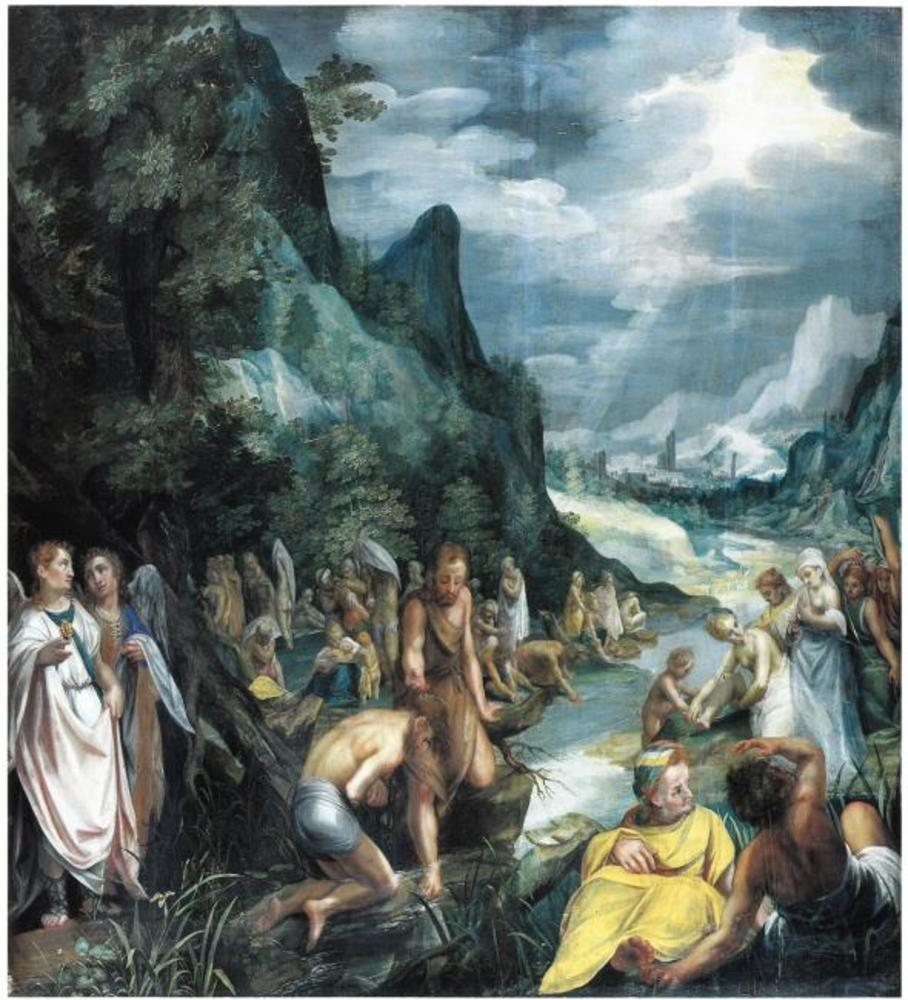
Baptism of Christ, 1609

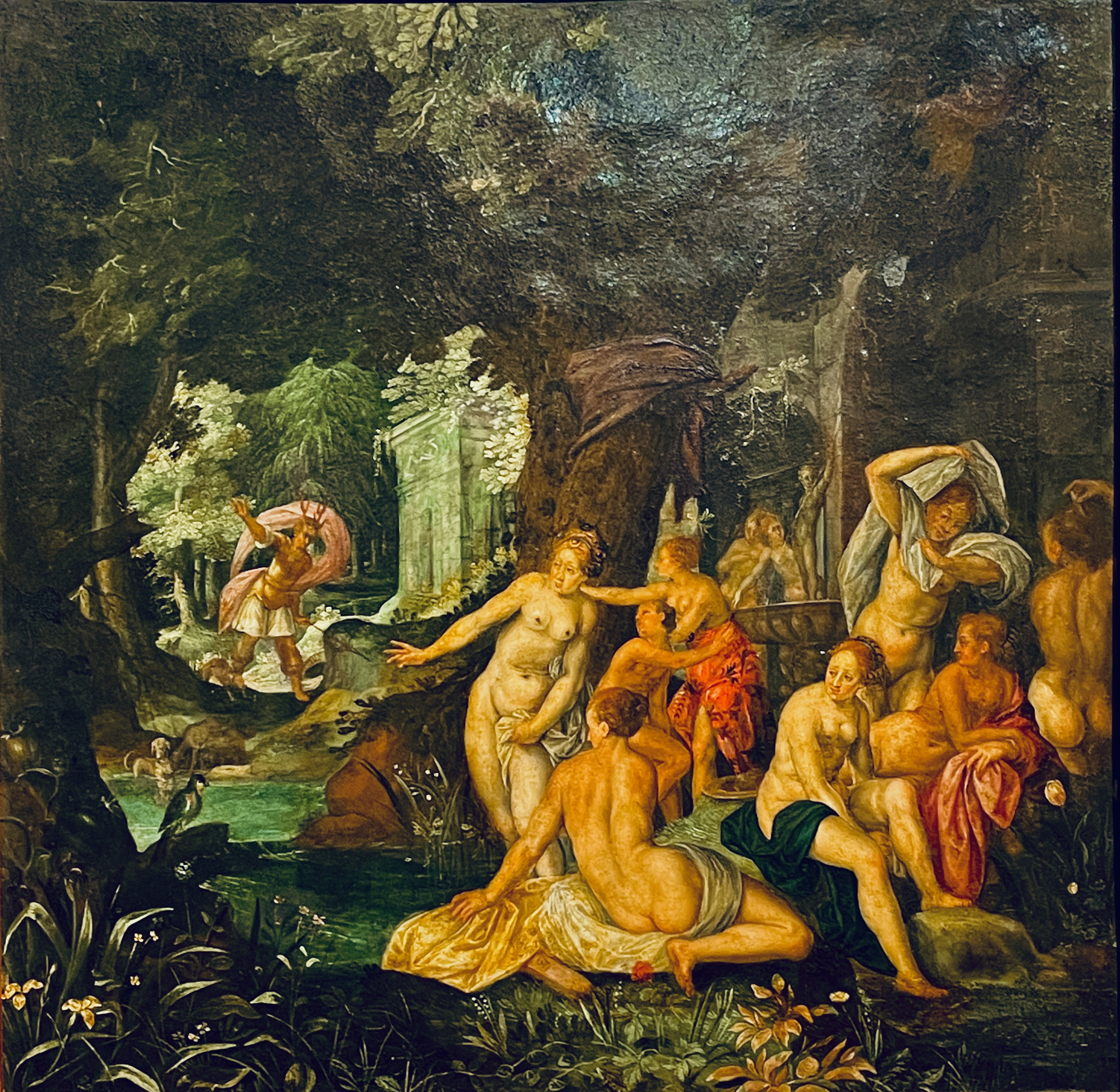
Diana and Actaeon, 1621

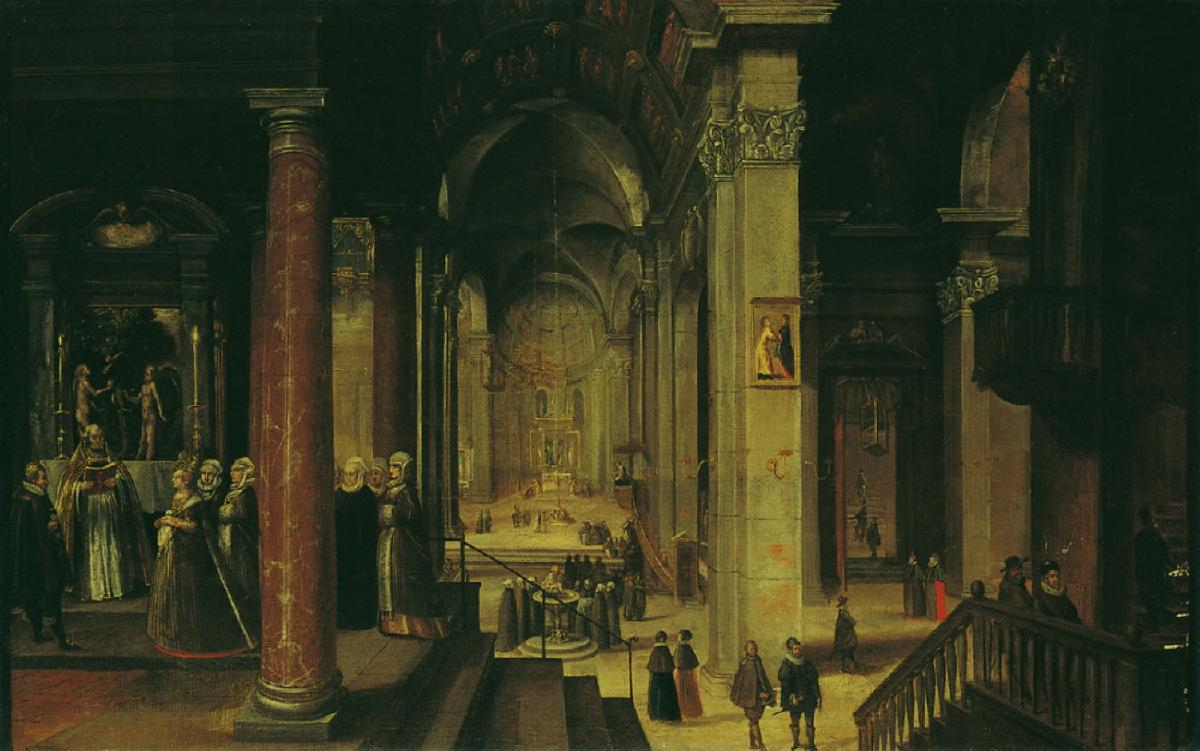
Church interior, circa 1630

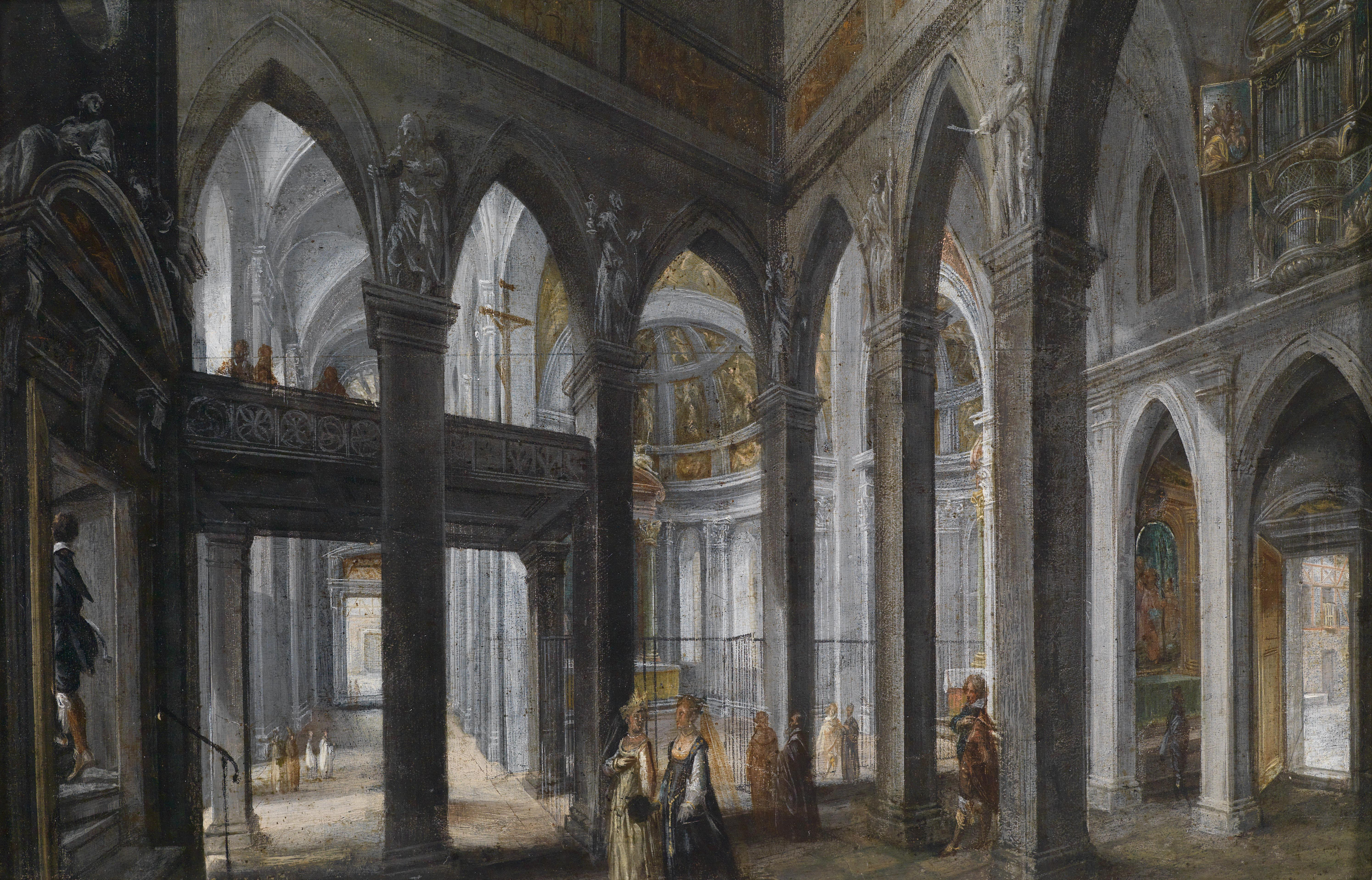
Church interior, 1622

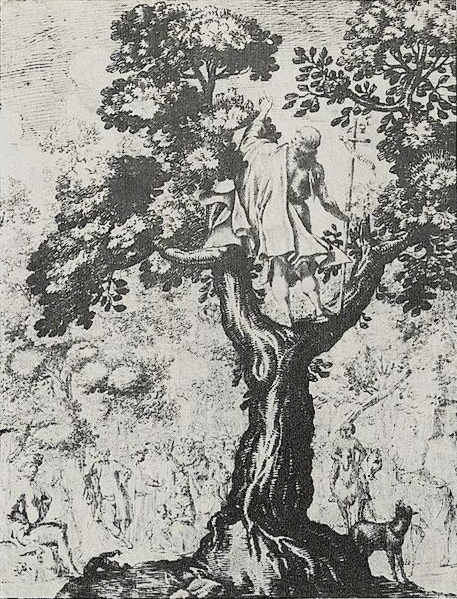
Preaching of St. John the Baptist

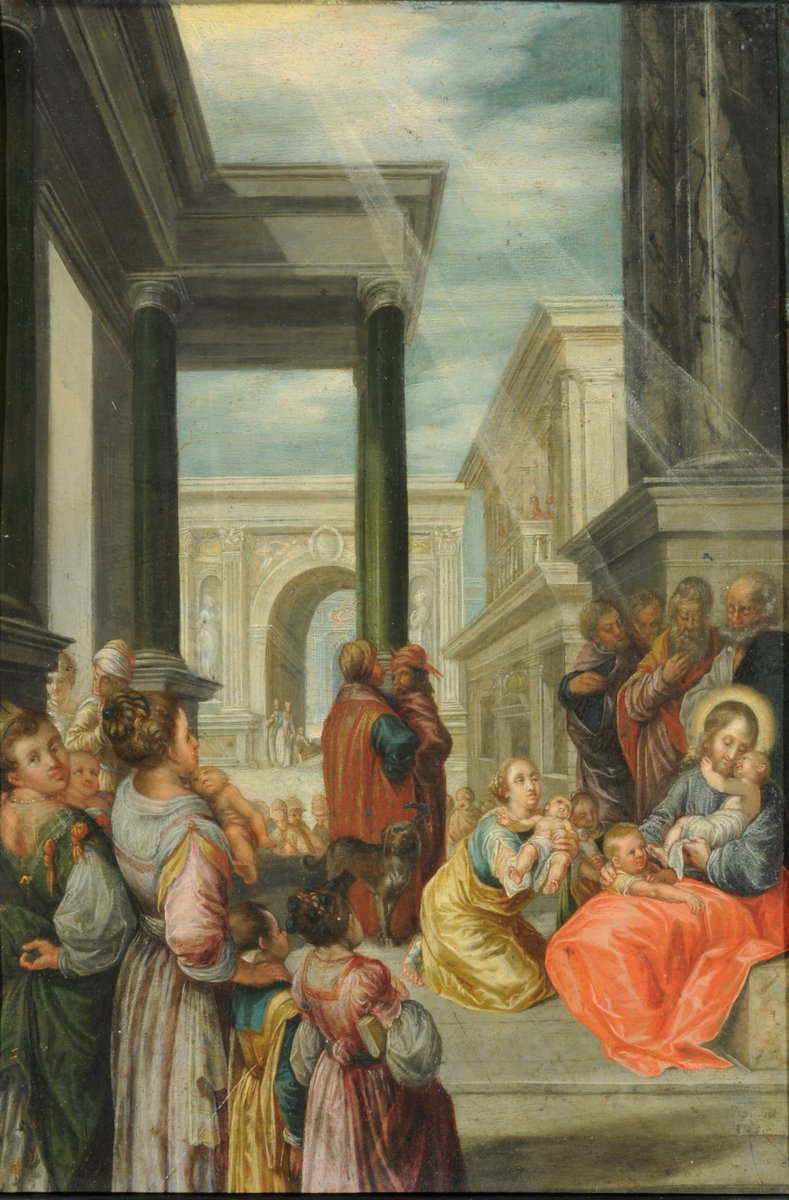
Suffer Little Children To Come Onto Me
