= Paolo Fiammingo =

Italian painter

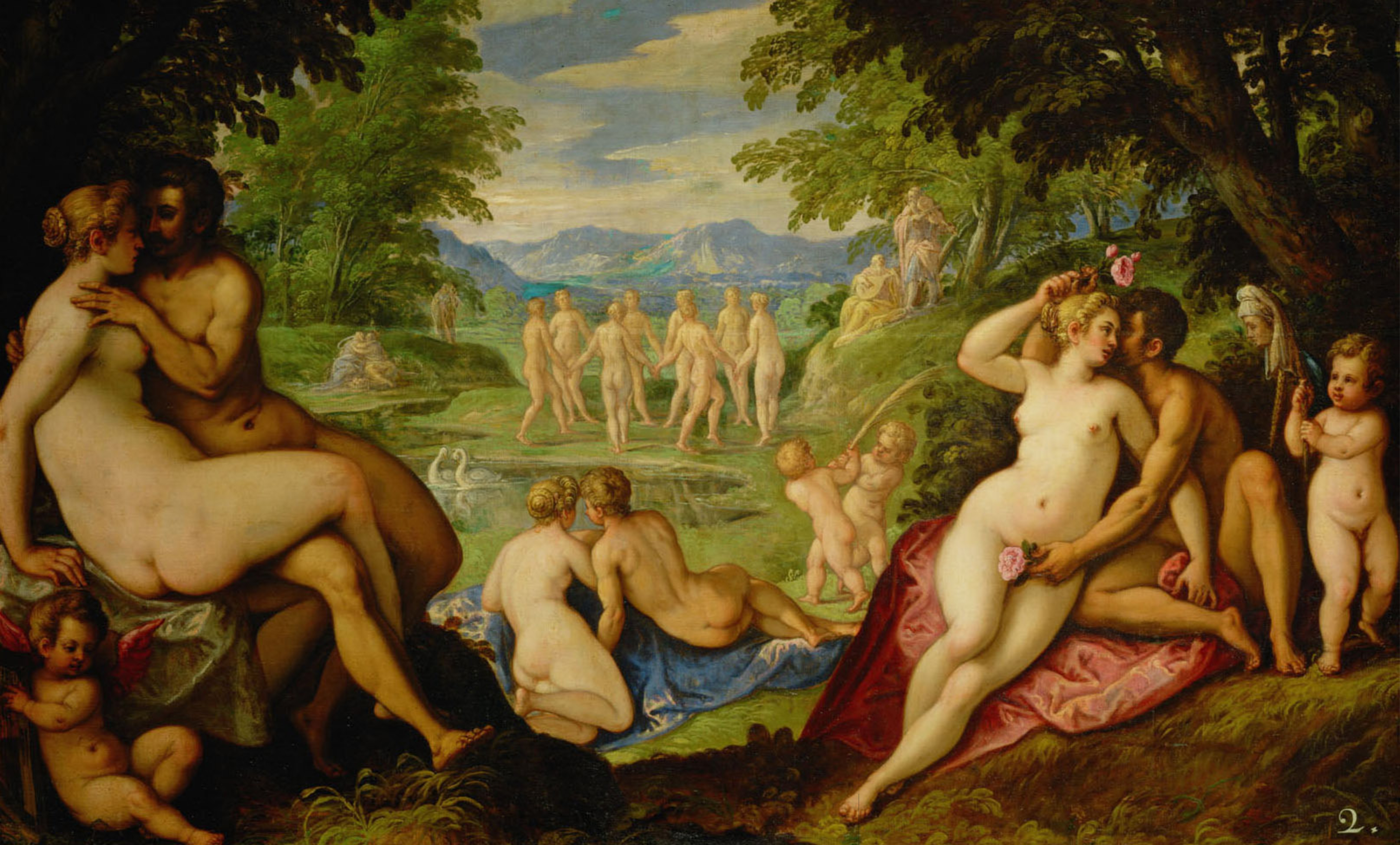
Mutual love (the Golden Age)

Pauwels Franck, known in Italy as Paolo Fiammingo and Paolo Franceschi (c. 1540–1596), was a Flemish painter, who, after training in Antwerp, was active in Venice for most of his life. He is mainly known for his landscapes with mythological, allegorical and religious scenes. He worked in a Mannerist style showing the influence of Tintoretto, Veronese, and Bassano.

== Life ==
No concrete details about Pauwels Franck's early life and training have been preserved. It is believed that he was born around 1540 based on a Venetian report of 1648 which states that he died at the age of 56. His birthplace is not known with certainty but it was likely Antwerp as he became a member of the Antwerp Guild of Saint Luke in 1561.

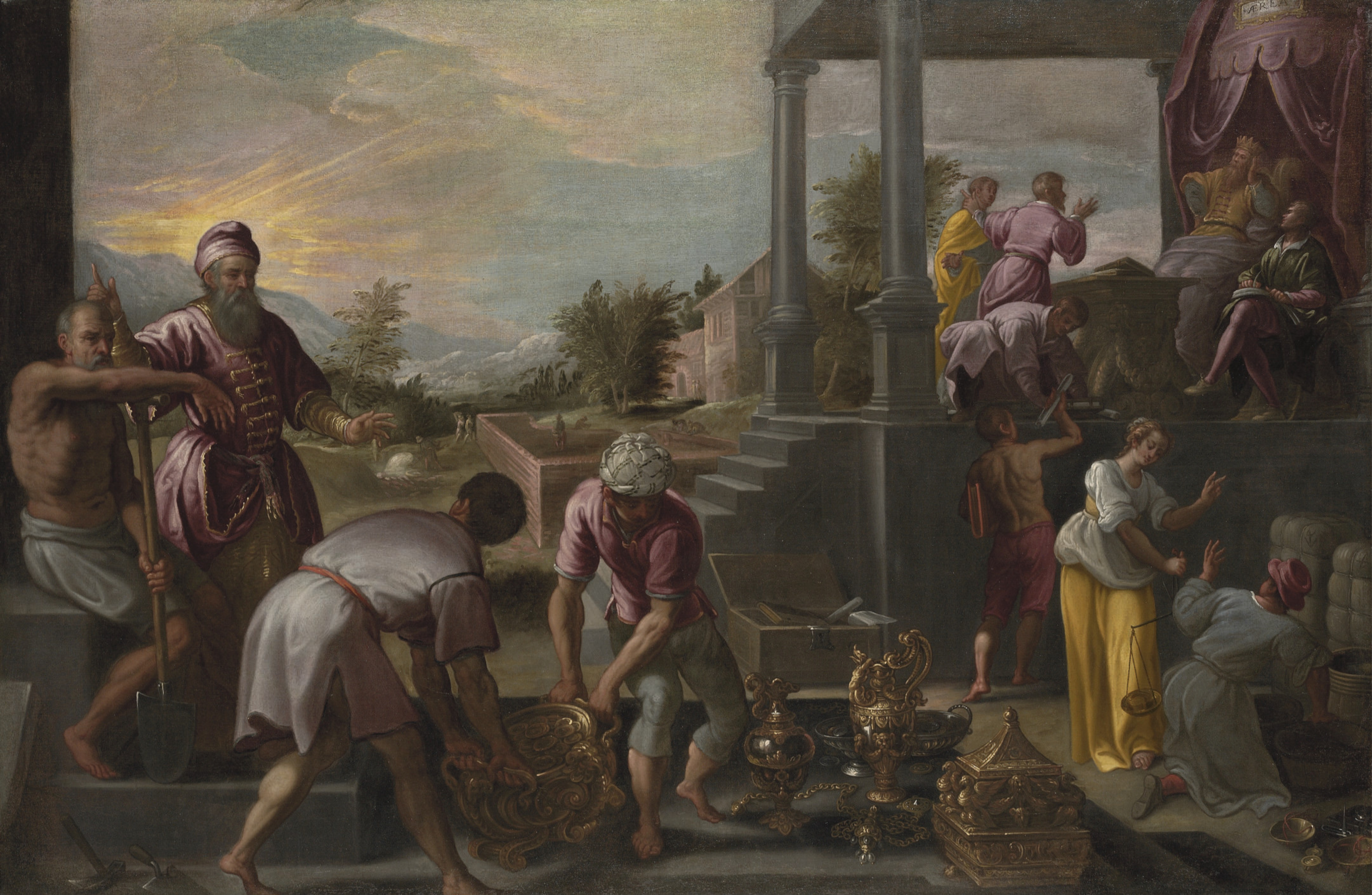
The Age of Bronze

The exact dates and details of his travel to Italy are not known. He is believed to have passed through Florence where he had contact with artists working in the Studiolo of Francesco I de' Medici, Grand Duke of Tuscany. He is recorded in Venice from 1573 but was likely an assistant in Tintoretto's workshop there already in the 1560s. He is believed to have painted the landscapes in works by Tintoretto. Around 1565 he made large paintings in the new sala dei Dogi, after the old one had been destroyed by fire. In Venice he is believed to have been in contact with his fellow countryman Lodewijk Toeput, who was also working in Tintoretto's workshop. The two artists may have met in Tintoretto's workshop.

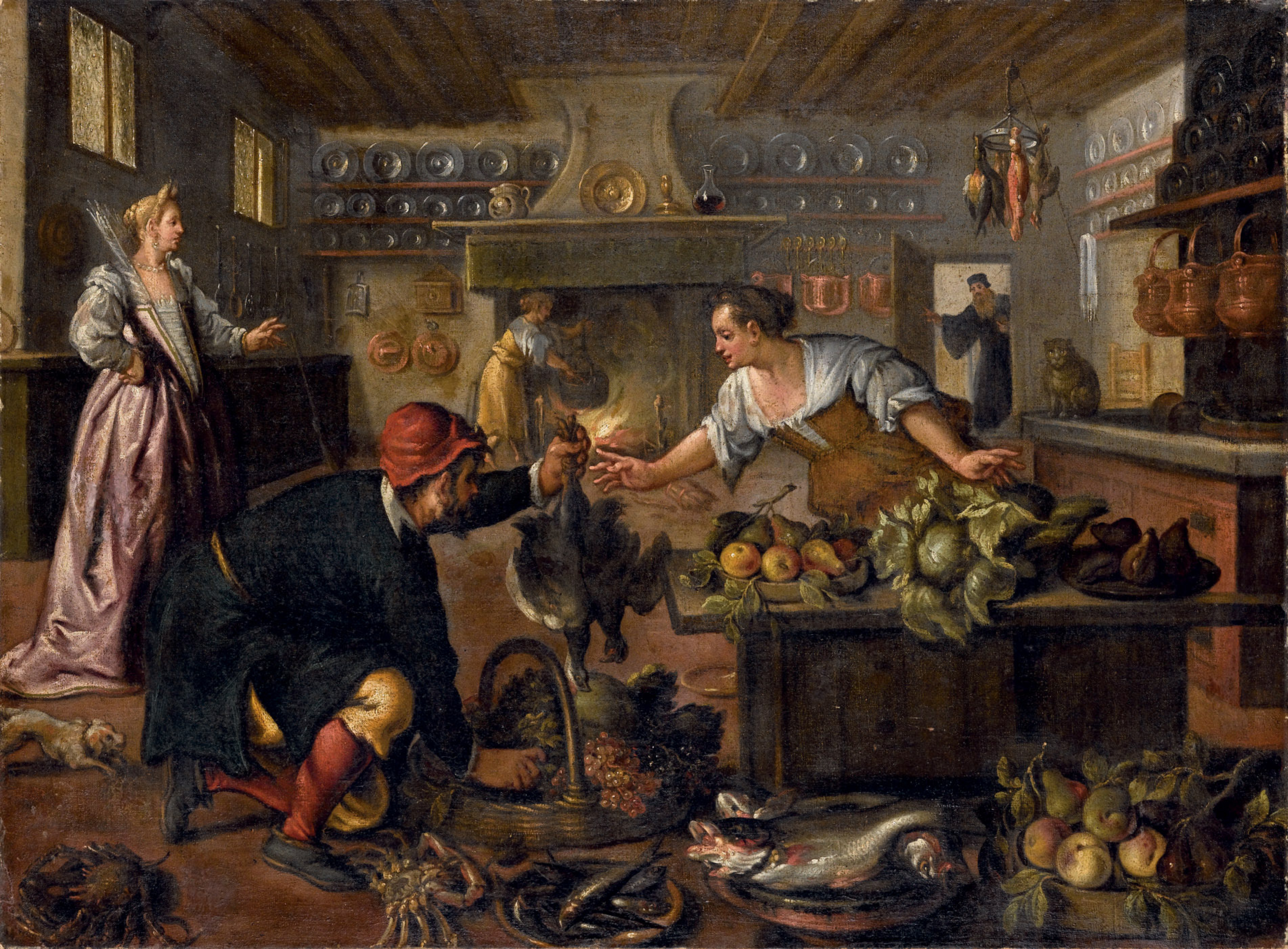
Kitchen with figures

From 1584 to his death the artist was registered at the painter's guild of Venice. In Italy the artist became known by the name Paolo Fiammingo ('Paul the Fleming'). He resided and worked in Venice for the rest of his career. He opened a successful studio in Venice, which received commissions from all over Europe.

He worked for international patrons including Hans Fugger, the heir of a German banking dynasty. Fugger commissioned him in 1580 to produce several series of paintings to decorate Castle Kirchheim in Bavaria near Augsburg, the Fugger family's summer residence. While Paolo Fiammingo produced a large number of work in the 1580s for the Fugger commissions, he appears to have produced at the same time several versions of many of the compositions made for the Fugger family. This suggests that Paolo ran a workshop of some size at the time.

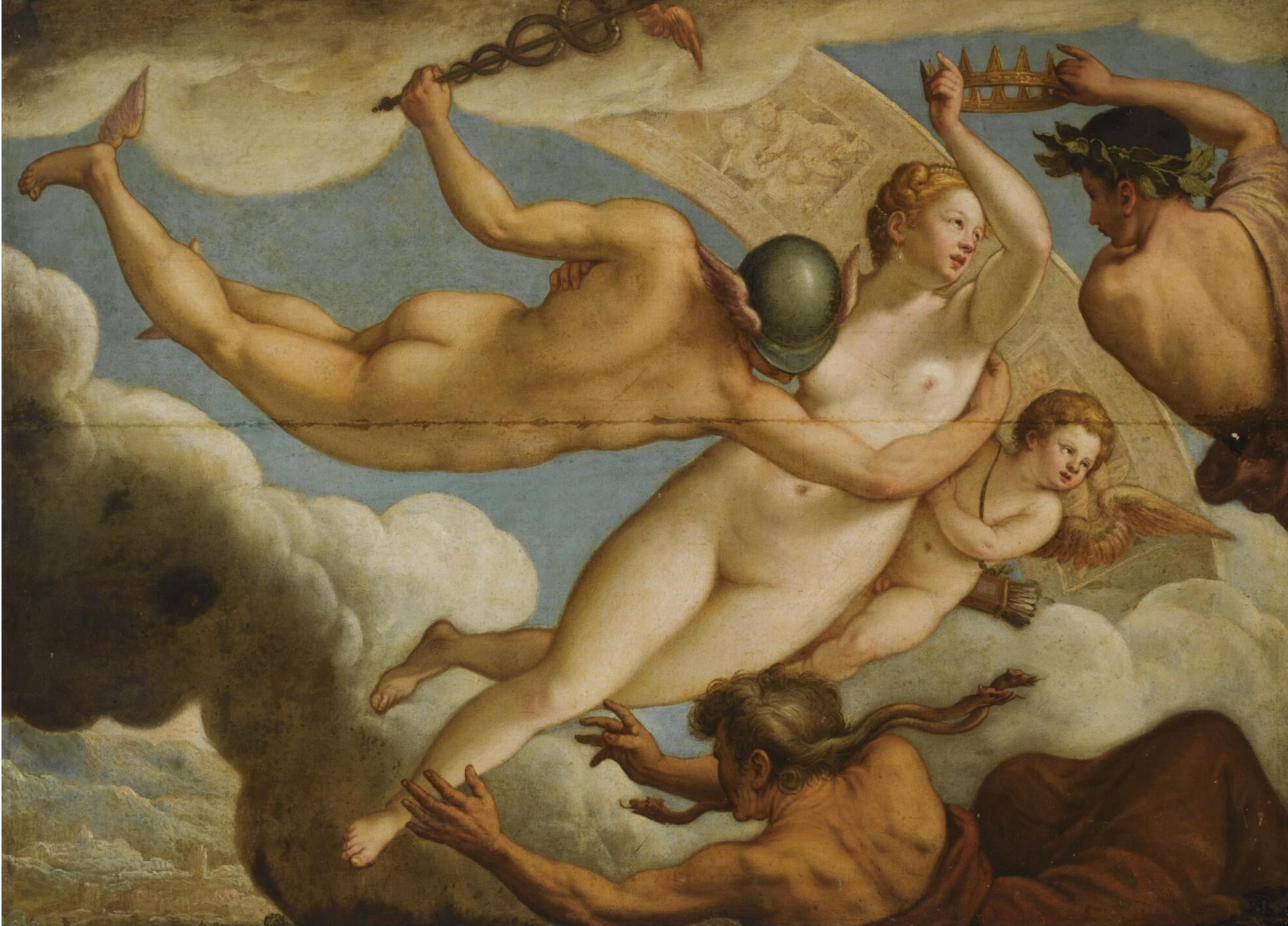
Mercury saving Virtue

Another important commission was for a painting showing Mercury saving Virtue in a series of the seven planets in the Fondaco dei Tedeschi in Venice. The other paintings of this series were made by his master Tintoretto and great artists of his time like Paolo Veronese and Jacopo Palma il Giovane. He painted various works for the palazzi and churches of Venice, many of which have been destroyed or dispersed during foreign occupations of Venice.

He died in Venice on 20 December 1596.

== Work ==
Paolo Fiammingo painted landscapes with many religious scenes but is mainly known for his allegorical and mythological scenes. The latter were inspired by Giorgione but were treated by Franck with a Venetian softness and grace and set in dreamlike landscapes. These landscapes anticipate the Italianate Flemish school later associated with Paul Bril and Jan Brueghel the Elder. A good example is the Landscape with the Expulsion of the Harpies (National Gallery London, 1592–6).

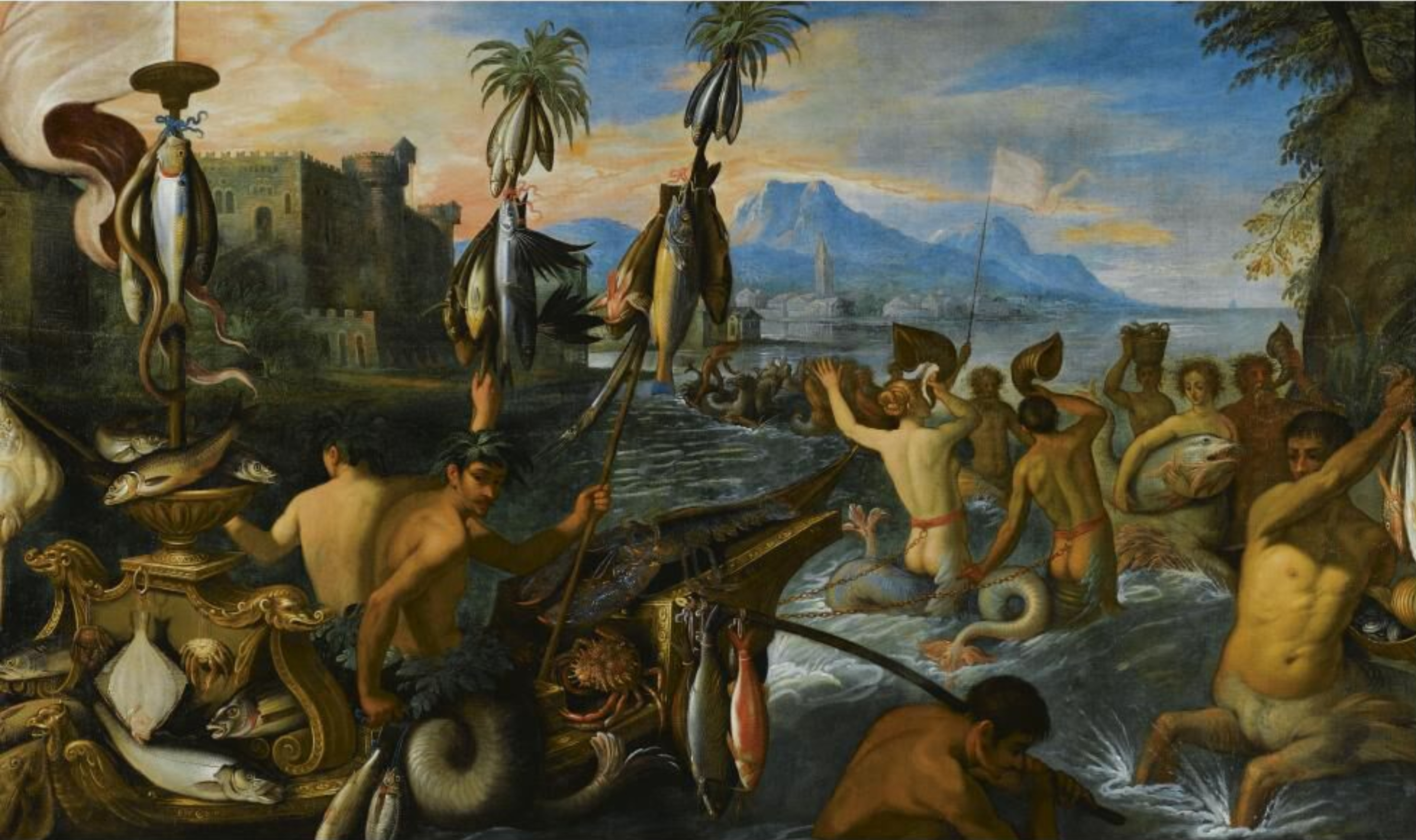
Allegory of water

The Fugger family gave various commissions to Paolo Fiammingo for the decoration of their new Castle Kirchheim in Württemberg for which he is believed to have painted at least 32 canvases. In 2007, 18 of these works were still in possession of the family, 8 in the Bayerische Staatsgemäldesammlungen, Munich, and one painting was in a private collection. Most of these paintings remained united for a long time although some dispersal started to happen from the 17th century. They were photographed at the end of the 19th century. The photos are an important source for understanding the work of Franck. Some of the works formerly in the Fugger collection have appeared recently at auctions.

One Fugger commission on which he worked between 1580 and 1592 was a series of twelve works depicting The Four Ages of Man. The iconography of this series was derived from Ovid's Metamorphoses (I:89-150), which recounts how the earthly paradise of the Golden Age descends through the Silver Age and Bronze Age into the strife and greed of the war-like Iron Age.

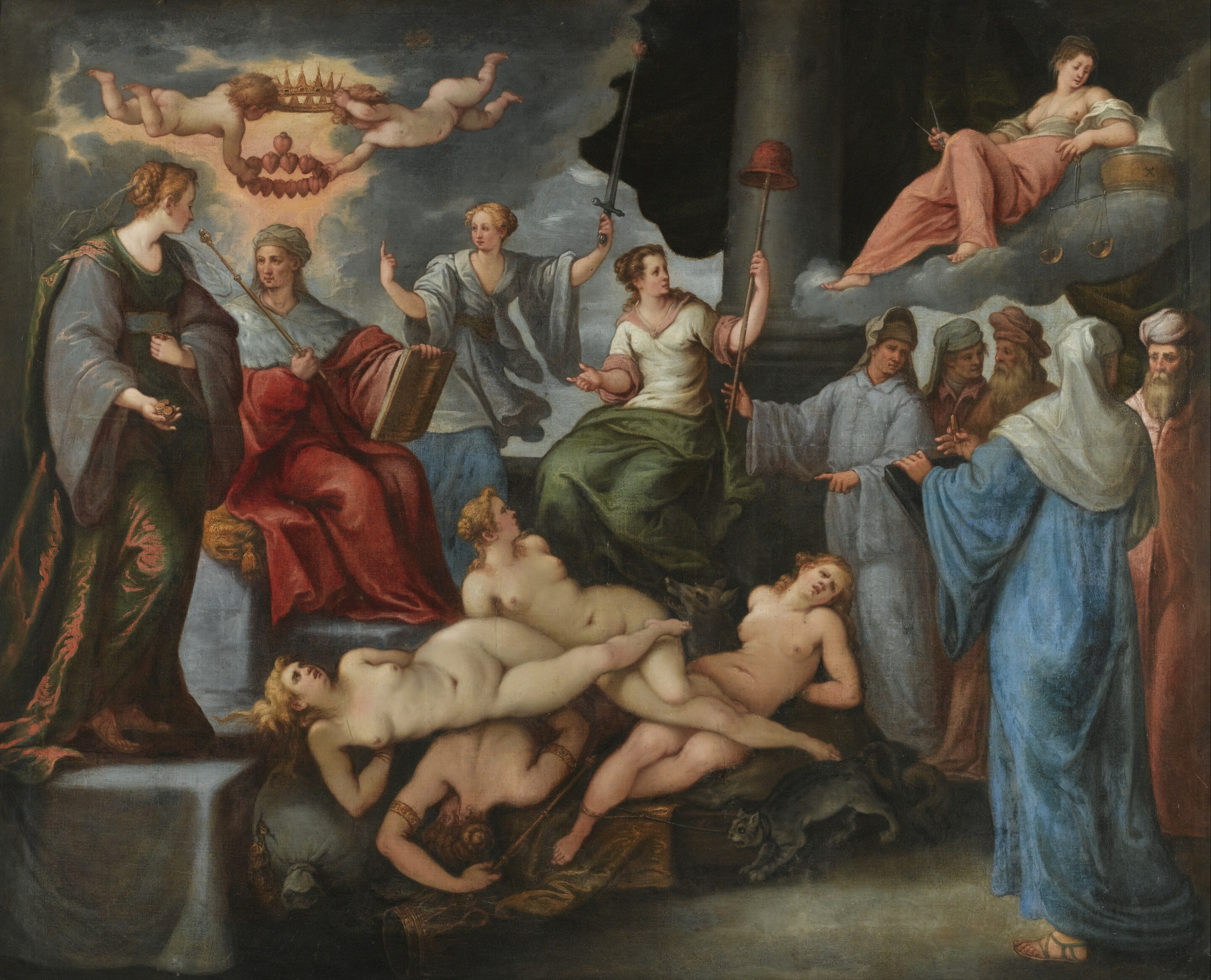
Triumph of the Virtues over the Vices

Another series made for the Fuggers was a set of the Planets in which the seven planets were represented. The series was completed by a composition of the Triumph of the Virtues over the Vices (Sotheby's auction in London on 6 July 2011). In the foreground there are four naked, partly tied female figures lying on sacks and chests, accompanied by a fierce looking dog and cat. This group of vices is surrounded by the personifications of four virtues and five philosophers or holy men. Another female figure with bare breasts resting on a cloud is watching a pot from which smoke is emerging. She is also holding a pair of compasses and a balance. The composition depicts the Triumph of the Virtues over the Vices as a trial of traitors.

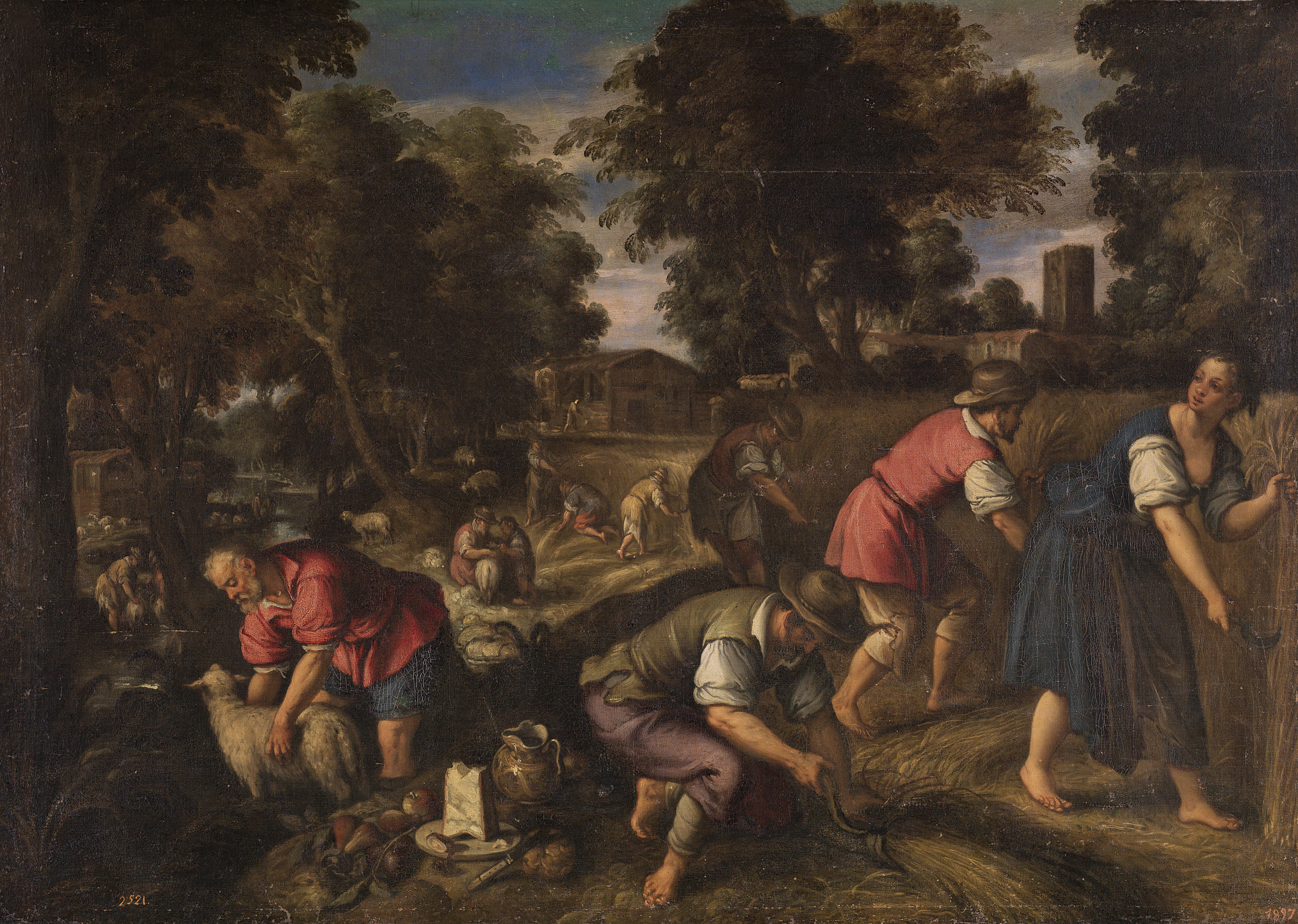
Mowing and Shearing (Allegory of Summer)

A series of allegories of the Four Elements made for the Fuggers are lost but other series and copies of these allegories are still in existence. A full set was sold at Sotheby's on 5 December 2007 lot 17. Another allegorical theme treated by the artist is that of the four seasons. A set is in the collection of the Prado and as is usual with these works, they illustrate the four seasons by depicting the human activities linked to each season.

His masterpieces include the four Allegories of Love (Kunsthistorisches Museum Vienna, c. 1585), including the Amore letheo, the Punishment of Love, Mutual Love and Love in the Golden Age. These last two works became rapidly known through prints made by Agostino Carracci. It is possible that Carracci's reproduction of Love in the Golden Age was the inspiration for Matisse's Le bonheur de vivre (Joy of Life).

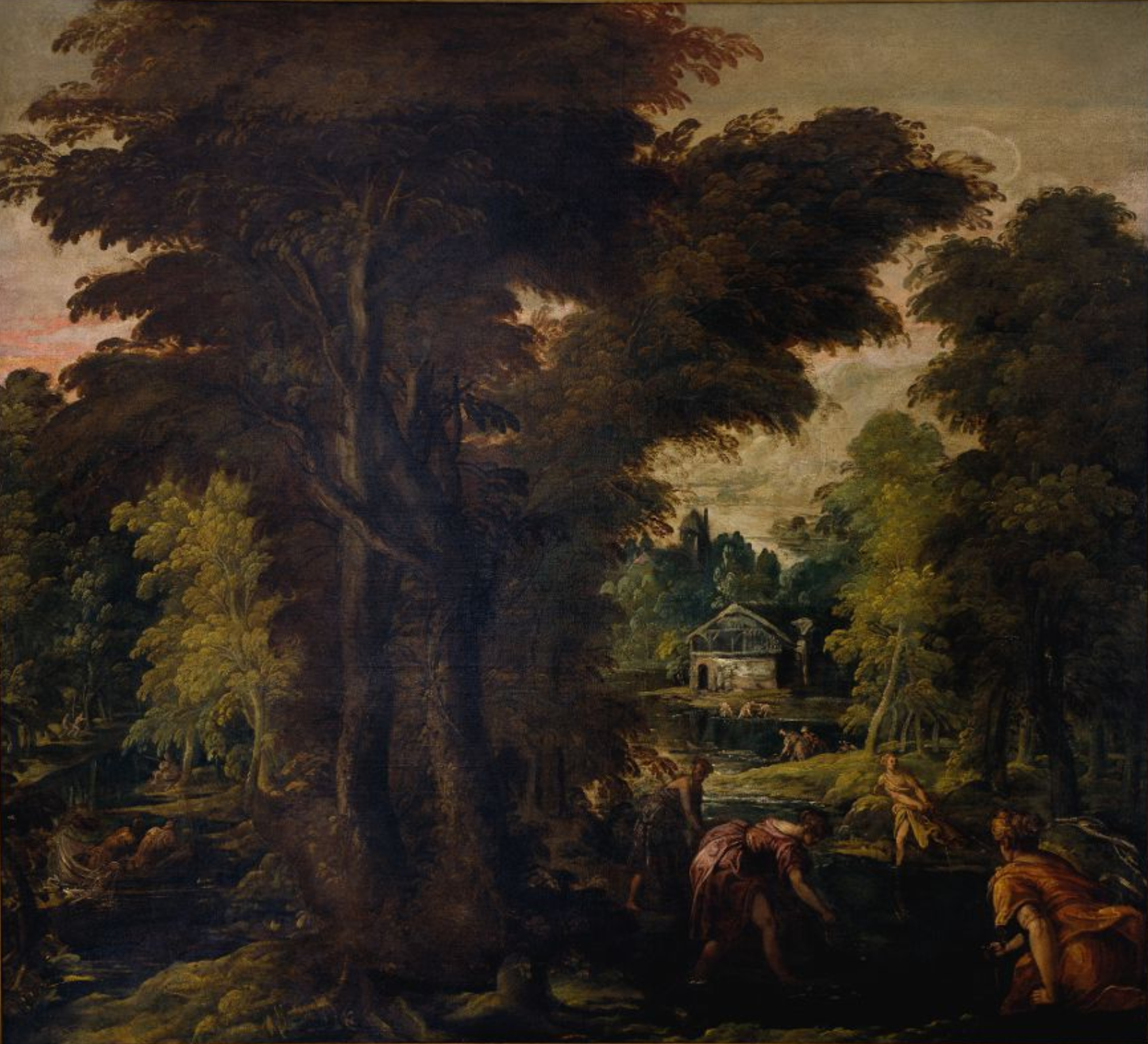
Landscape with nymphs fishing

Landscapes took up a more important part of the artist's activity from 1590 onwards. He is known to have painted the landscape backgrounds for works by Tintoretto and Maerten de Vos. His landscape compositions combine the Nordic tradition of landscape paintings with Venetian pictorial plots. His brushwork is loose and less descriptive than Flemish landscapes from the same time. His palette is decidedly Venetian, with mainly warm colours, dominated by brown, red and pink. An example is the Landscape with nymphs fishing (Pinacoteca Civica, Vicenza), dating from the later period of his career when he often reflected on the themes of hunting and fishing activities. While the landscape component is prevalent in this composition there is a narrative element with nymphs fishing and figures darting from the foreground to the background. The exuberance of the nature portrayed with great precision shows his Flemish training. The Flemish character is tempered by obvious Venetian influences, and in particular that of Tintoretto, reflected in the perspective view and the sudden movement of protagonists, highlighted by light touches and light strokes. The dreamlike aspect of his later landscapes anticipate the Italianate Flemish landscape school often associated with the Flemish painters Paul Bril and Jan Brueghel the Elder.
