= Marten van Valckenborch =

Flemish painter (1535–1612)

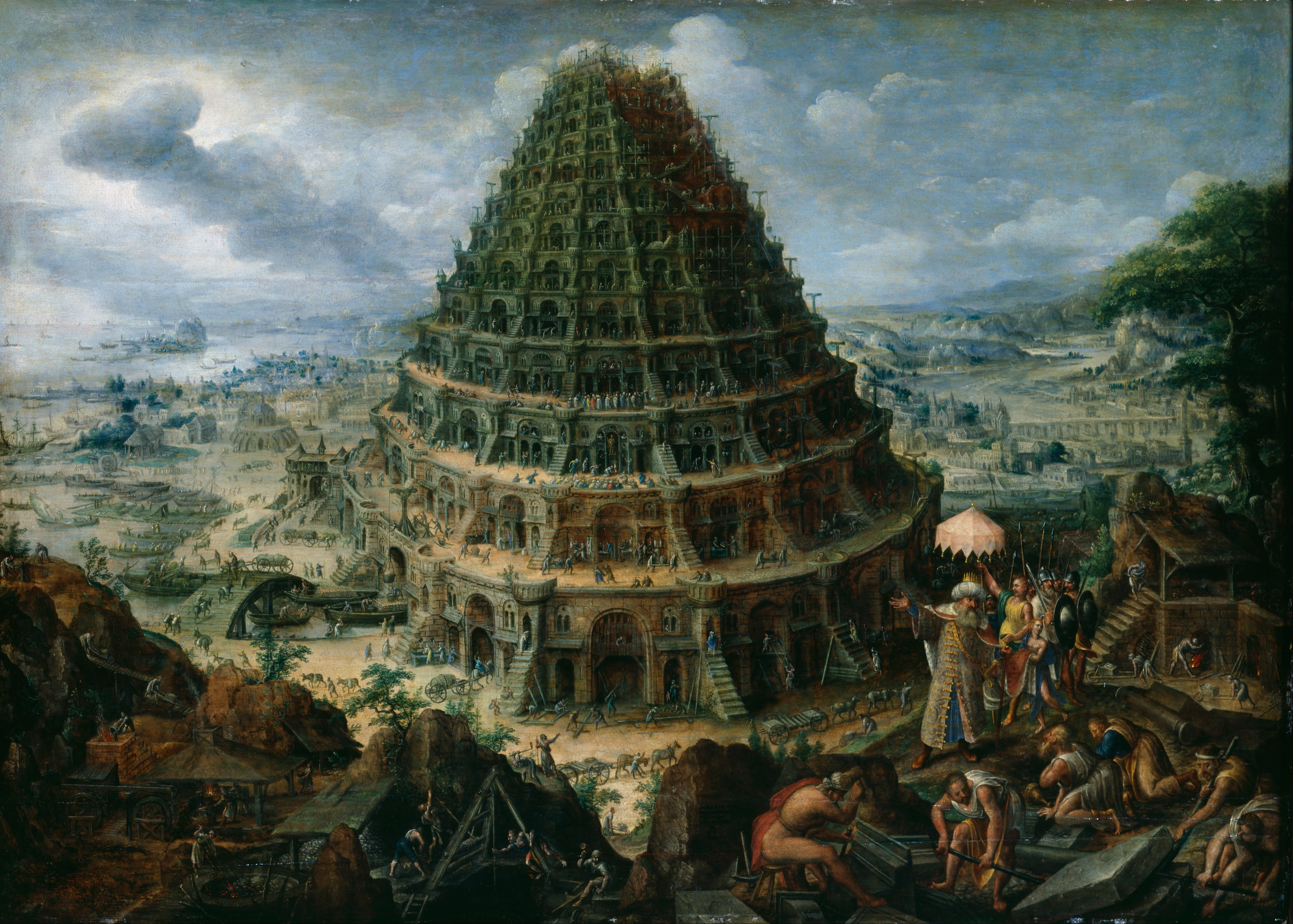
The tower of Babel

Marten van Valckenborch or Marten van Valckenborch the Elder (1535 in Leuven – 1612 in Frankfurt), was a Flemish Renaissance painter, mainly known for his landscapes and city scapes. He also made allegorical paintings and some portraits. After commencing his career in the Spanish Netherlands, he later migrated to Frankfurt in Germany where he and other members of his extended family of artists played an important role in local artistic developments.

== Life ==
Marten van Valckenborch was born in Leuven in what would become one of the most prominent Flemish families of artists. Spanning three generations, 14 artists are recorded in the family of whom his younger brother Lucas the Elder and his own sons, Frederik van Valckenborch and Gillis van Valckenborch, were the most important personalities.

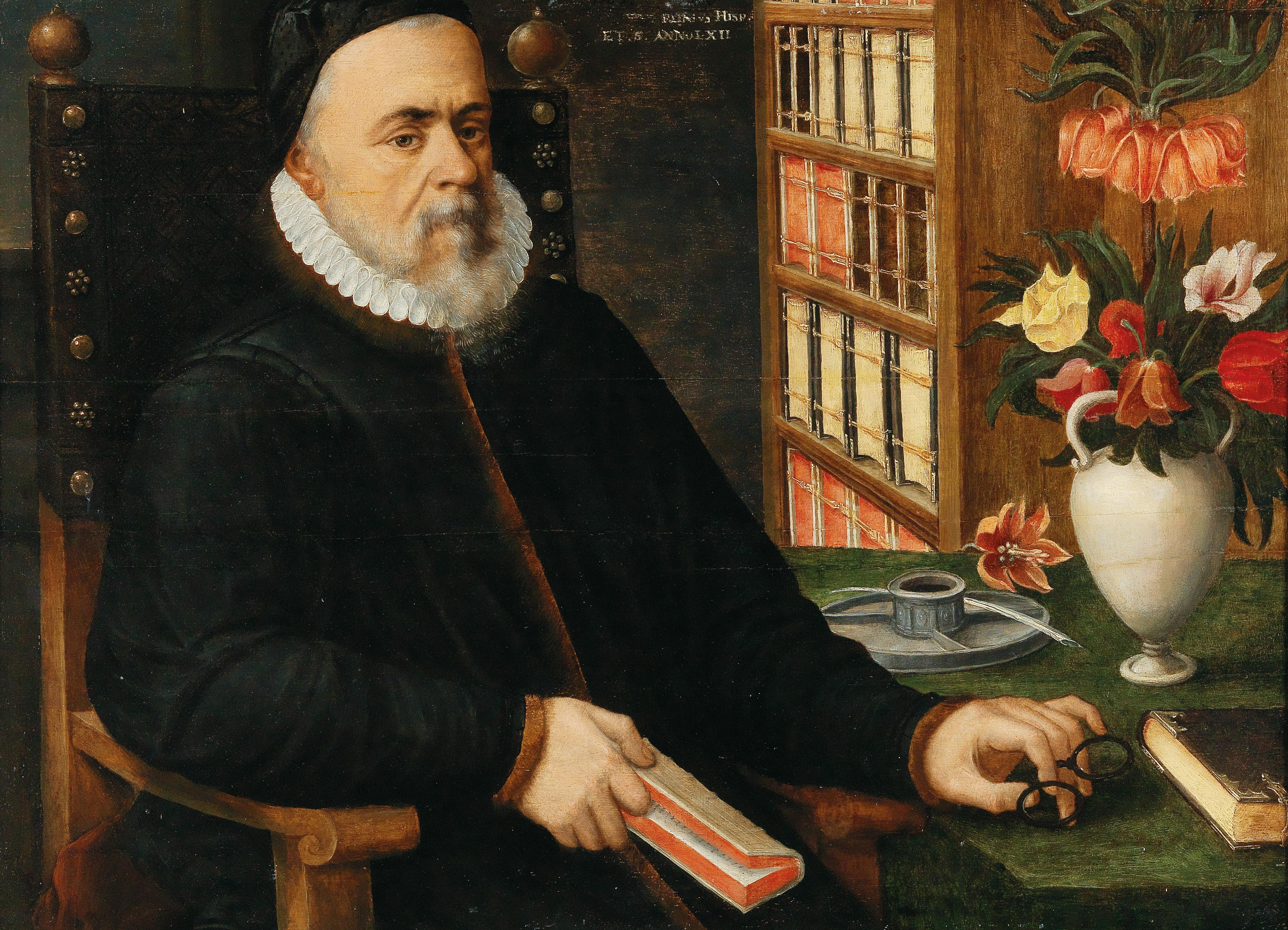
Portrait of a scholar, probably Carolus Clusius

Marten joined the Guild of St Luke in Mechelen on 13 August 1559. On 3 December 1563 Gysbrecht Jaspers was recorded as his pupil. The early biographer Karel van Mander reported that Marten van Valckenborch learned to paint landscapes in Mechelen, which was known at the time as a center for oil and water-colours and especially landscape painting. In 1564 Marten moved to Antwerp, where his brother Geraard van Valckenborch trained with him until 1568.

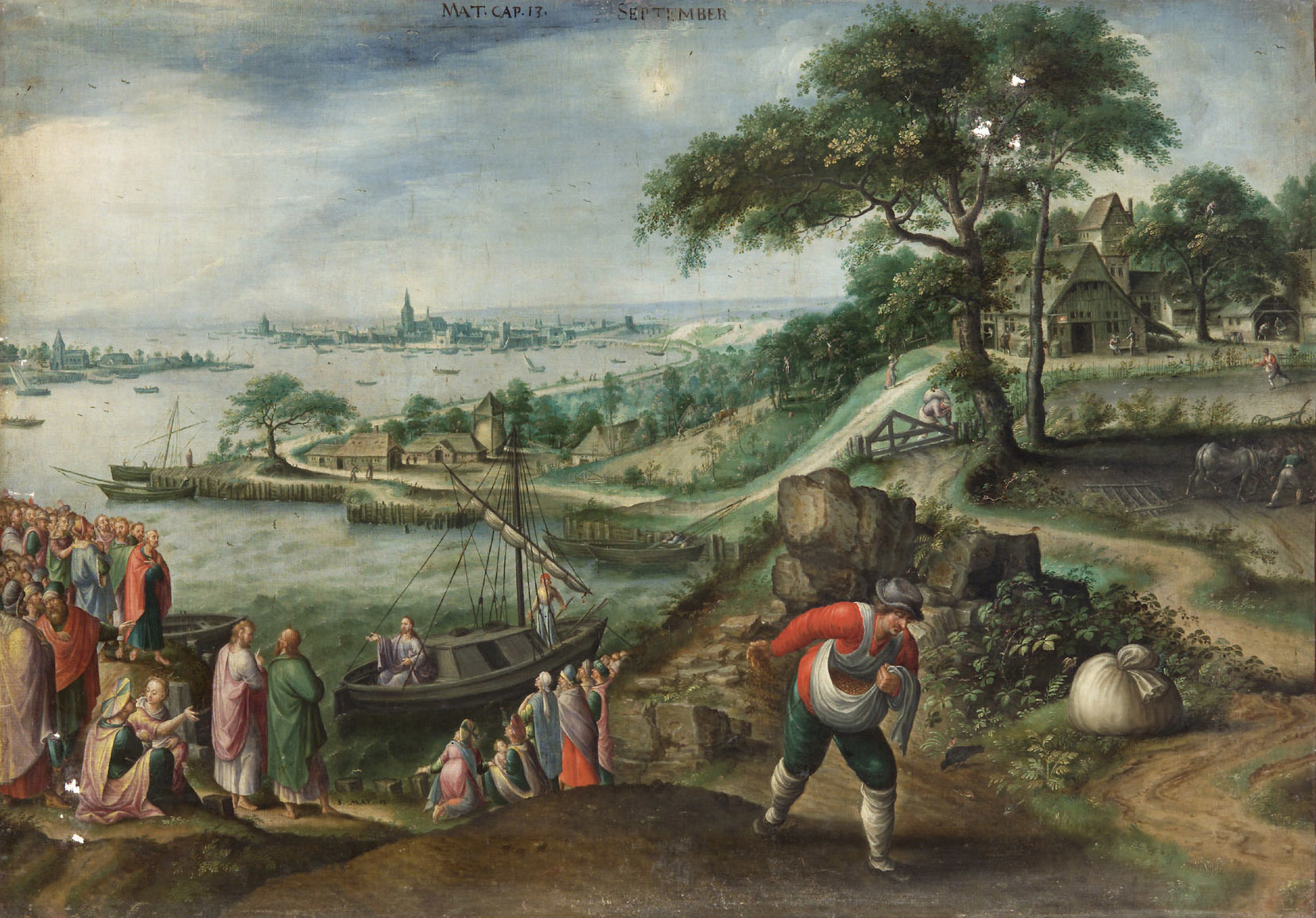
Parable of the sower (month of September)

At the start of the iconoclastic fury of the Beeldenstorm in 1566 he left town with his brother Lucas. The brothers made a trip from Liège to Aachen along the Meuse (river), painting river valley views. In 1566 the artist was in Aachen, where he was joined in 1570 by his brother Lucas. In Aachen, the two brothers were also joined for two years by Hans Vredeman de Vries, friend and fellow artist. Hendrik van Steenwijk the Elder also resided in Aachen where he married Marten van Valckenborch's daughter. Marten became a citizen of Aachen in 1573.

Marten was recorded back in Antwerp in the years 1575-1576 and was referred to as an ouderman (elder) in the Antwerp Guild of St Luke in 1584. He left the Spanish Netherlands after the Fall of Antwerp in 1585.

He was registered in Frankfurt from 1586 onwards. On 7 July 1586 Marten became a citizen of Frankfurt, together with his son-in-law Hendrik van Steenwijk the elder. At the beginning of 1593 his brother Lucas joined Marten in Frankfurt after a residence in Austria.

Marten and his brother operated in Frankfurt a large workshop, which his sons Gillis and Frederik joined. Marten died in 1612 in Frankfurt.

== Work ==
Marten's subject matter was principally landscapes populated with religious or allegorical themes or depicting agricultural or mining scenes. He also produced some portraits and also collaborated as a staffage painter with the still life painter Georg Flegel. His work has been overshadowed by that of his brother Lucas the Elder, who achieved prominence as the court painter of Archduke Matthias of Austria, during the Archduke's term as governor of the Spanish Netherlands and afterwards.

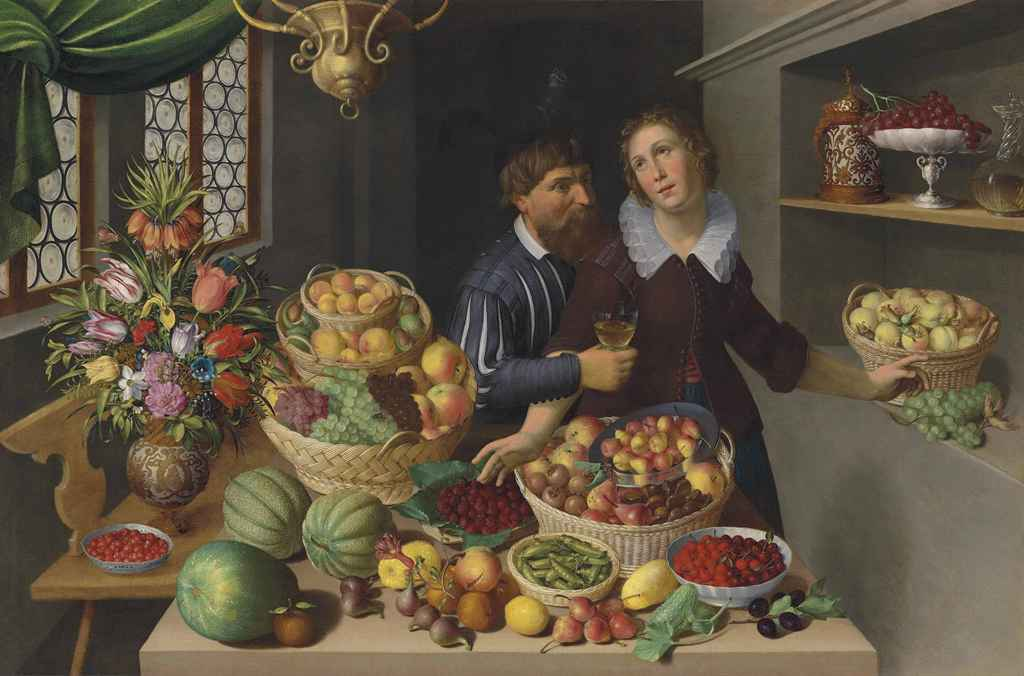
Interior with a couple and a vase of flowers and fruit on a table with Georg Flegel

In his early works, Marten showed a preference for landscapes of uniform terrain with shallow undulations, in which he always placed oak trees as an articulating element. He also often included large or numerous incidental figures, as he did in the 11 paintings representing allegories of the months (all in the Kunsthistorisches Museum, Vienna). He later developed towards a more late Mannerist idiom. Landscapes in this late style are characterised by dramatically agitated clouds and large mountains. An example is The tower of Babel (1595, Gemäldegalerie Alte Meister). He thus represented the final iteration of the panoramic, so-called world landscape combining linear and aerial perspective as developed by Pieter Brueghel the Elder. His landscapes meticulously represent topographical details in a limited range of sober colours and are enlivened by the people placed in them.

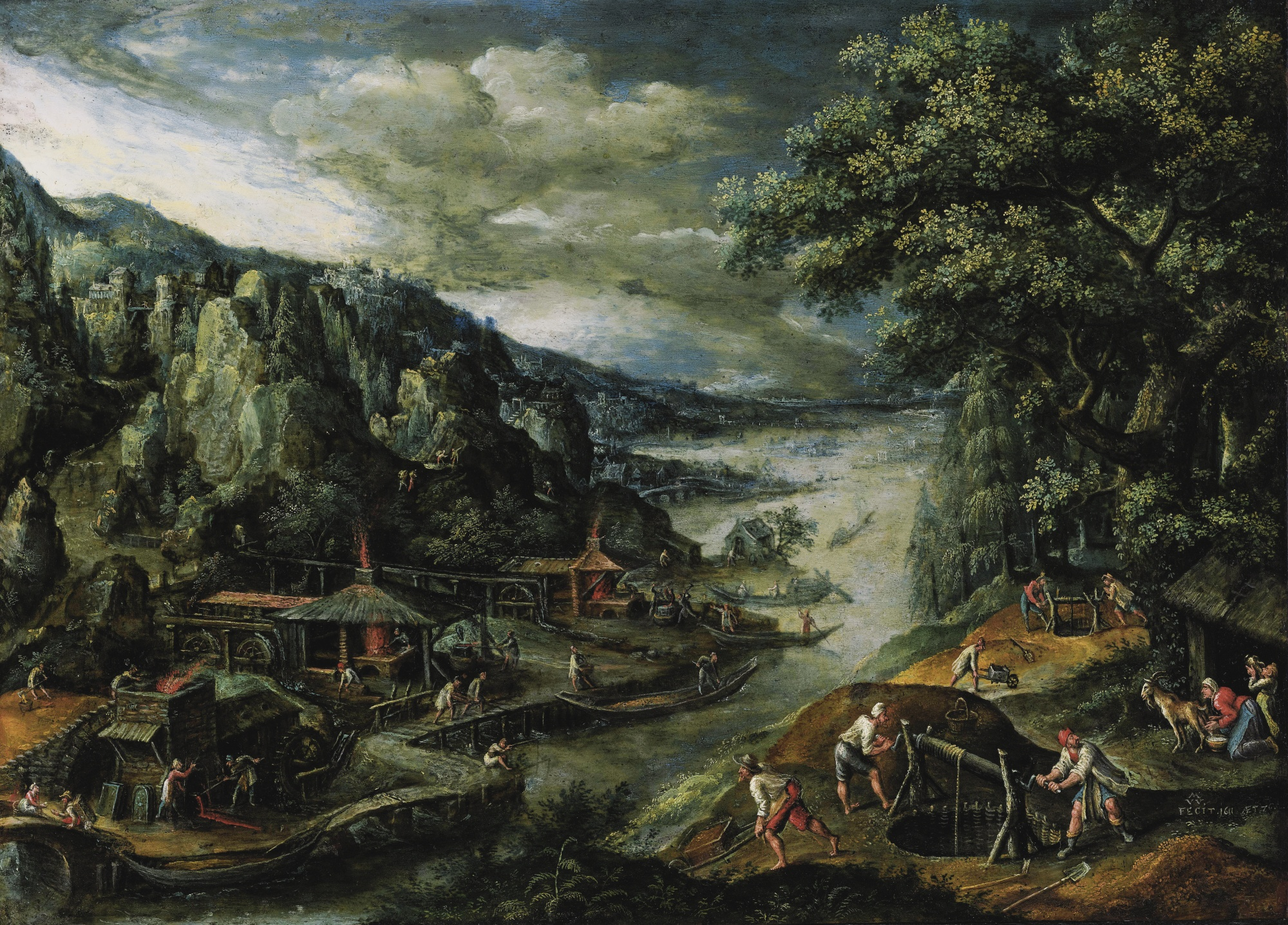
River valley with iron mining scenes, 1611

He painted, like his brother Lucas, a number of mining scenes, which were probably based on his drawings of scenes along the Meuse river valley around present-day Huy in Belgium. There he had likely witnessed and sketched mining activities related to the iron industry. Some of his paintings of mining scenes such as River valley with iron mining scenes provide detailed depictions of the mining and smelting process of the late 16th and early 17th century.

Marten van Valckenborch regularly returned to the subject of the Tower of Babel, which was also depicted by Pieter Bruegel the Elder and later by a whole range of Flemish artists. The subject of the Tower of Babel is usually interpreted as a critique of human hubris, and in particular of the Roman Catholic Church which at the time was undertaking at great expense large-scale construction projects such as the St. Peter's Basilica. However, it has also been viewed as a celebration of technical progress, which would herald a better and more organized world.

Marten Van Valkenborch was born in 1535 in Leuven (Leuven is in Belgium). Just like many of the previous artists, he was born into a sort of multigenerational art lineage. His younger brother Lucas and Martens sons, Freddrick and Gillis, were among the most important members of this artist dynasty.

Marten's formal training started in Mechelen, a city known for watercolor and oil landscape painters. He became a well-known artist and worked alongside other major artists such as Hans Vredeman de Vries and Hendrik van Steenwijk. He got his first pupil in 1563 at 28 years old showing that he had already achieved recognized mastery

Other recognizable paintings by Valkenborch are:

- The Tower of Babel — a biblical painting done in watercolor and pencil
- Mountain Landscape — A panoramic image of mountains and agitated clouds
- Adoration of the Magi — (January) The most reproduced of his months collection

The Parable of the Sower was part of Valkenborch's months collection, it represented September. The painting combines both his panoramic art style with his religious themes, making it one of his best-known paintings. The medium was oil on canvas like most of his original works. Valkenborch died in Frankfurt in 1612.

As mentioned, his family was made up of multiple artists. The long list includes the following

Lucas van Valckenborch the Elder — Marten’s younger brother

Frederik van Valckenborch — Marten’s son

Gillis (Egidius) van Valckenborch — Marten’s son

Marten van Valckenborch II — Marten’s son

Lucas van Valckenborch II — Marten’s nephew

Johan Jacob van Valckenborch — A later family member

This is only six of fourteen historically recognized Valkenborch artists.

—— Maléx Beuaregard Veylor Artist-Author-Researcher
