= Gillis van Valckenborch =

Dutch painter (1570–1622)

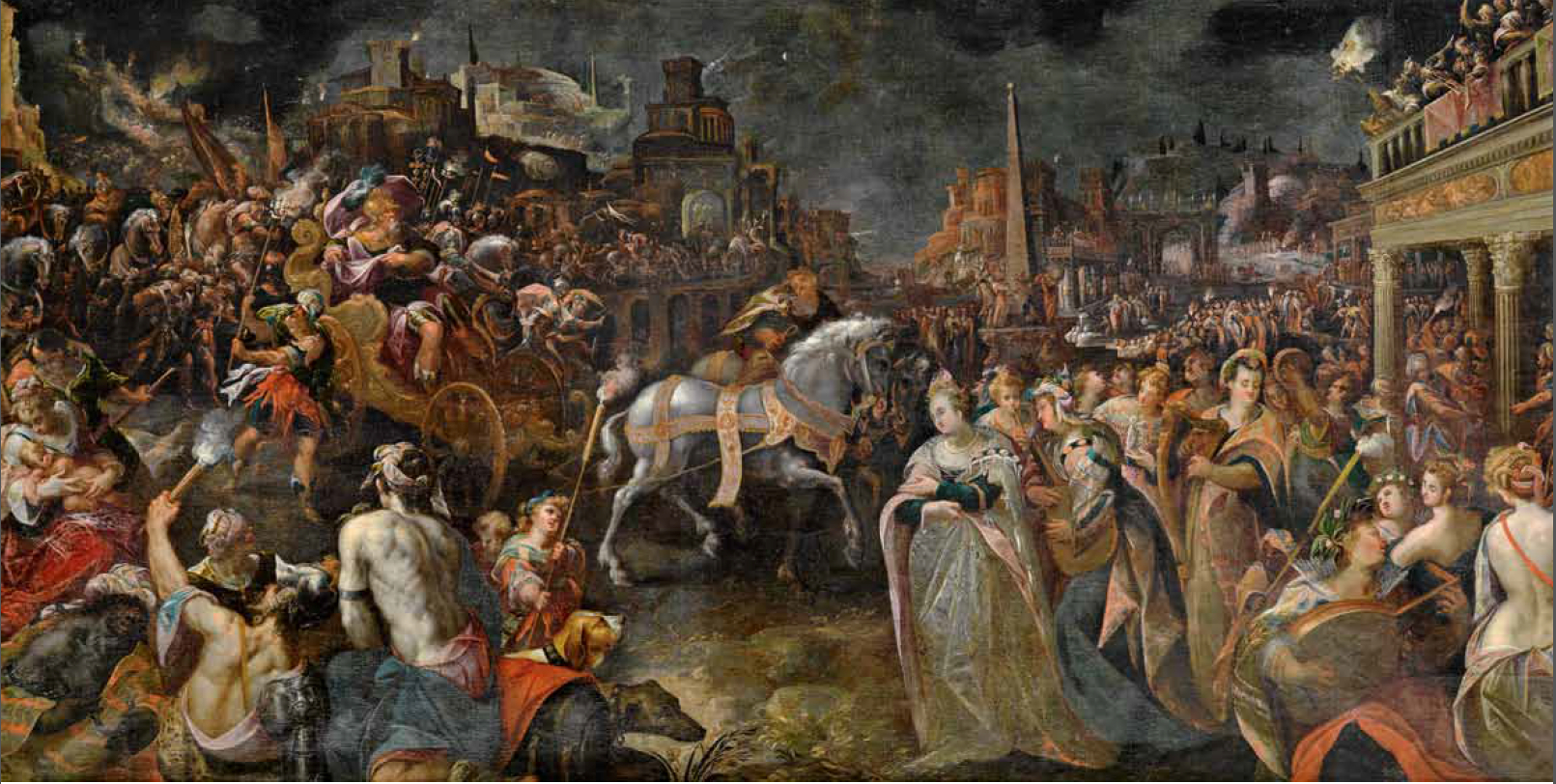
The Return of Jephthah

Gillis van Valckenborch or Egidius van Valckenborch (1570 in Antwerp – end of March or 1 April 1622 in Frankfurt am Main) was a Flemish painter and draughtsman who spent most of his career in Germany. He was a member of the van Valckenborch dynasty of painters who painted mainly landscapes. Unlike his family members, he is mainly known for his large-scale compositions with many swirling figures depicting scenes from ancient history or mythology. While his landscape drawings evidence his interest in landscape art no landscape paintings have been attributed to him.

== Life ==
Gillis van Valckenborch was born into a well-known family of artists. Fourteen known painters are recorded in the family history. Of these, his father Marten van Valckenborch (1535–1612), his brother Frederik van Valckenborch and his uncle Lucas van Valckenborch the elder achieved notable fame as painters. The van Valckenborch family was particularly known in the Spanish Netherlands for landscape painting.

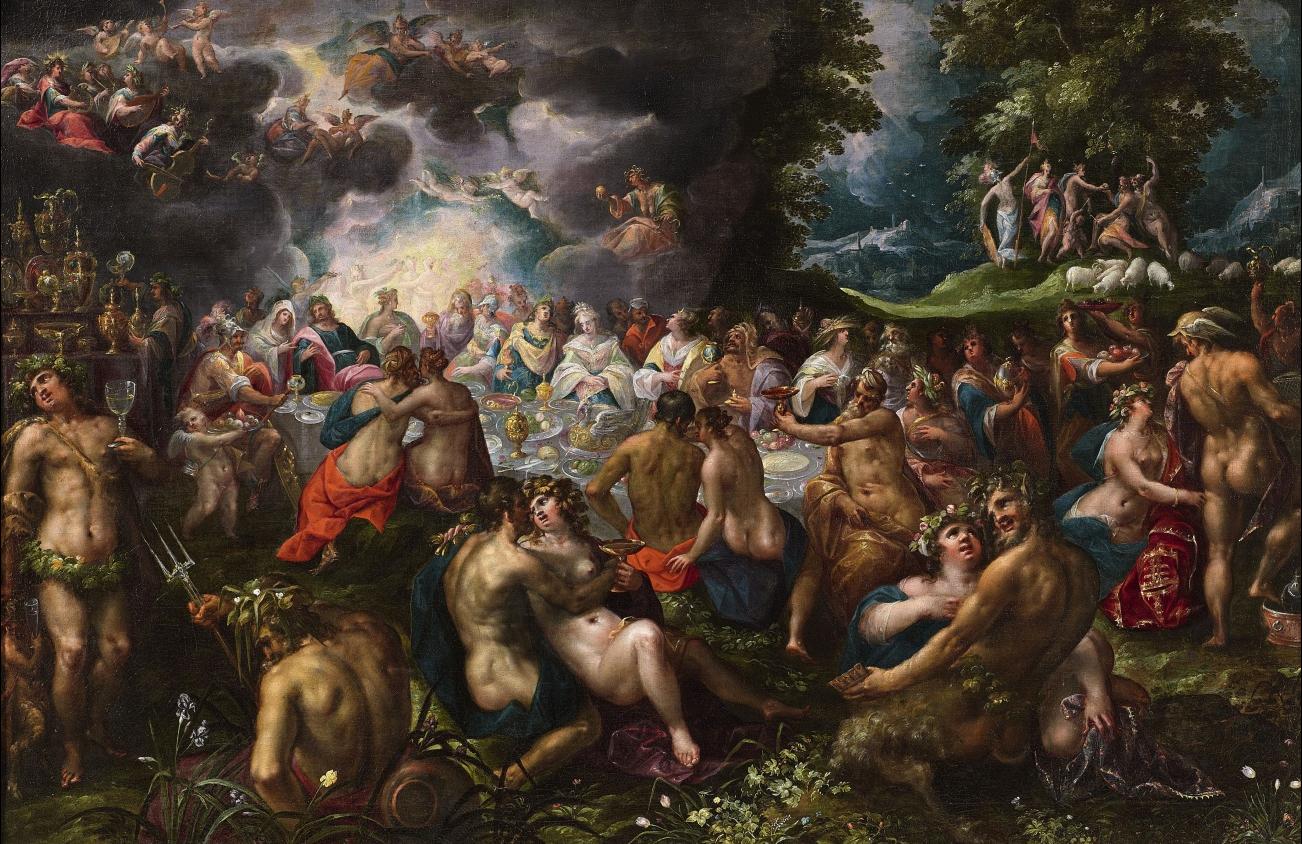
The marriage of Peleus and Thetis

Originally from Leuven, Marten van Valckenborch moved to Antwerp in the 1560s. Like many other families in the region who had become Calvinists, Marten moved with his family from the Spanish-occupied Spanish Netherlands to the more liberal environment of Frankfurt am Main, which was a German imperial outpost. The van Valckenborchs thrived in their new home town, quickly establishing themselves as authorities in the arts. They had an important influence on the artistic developments in Frankfurt am Main.

Gillis van Valckenborch received his earliest training in Antwerp possibly from his brother Frederik. It is believed Gillis and his brother Frederik travelled to Italy in 1590–1592, although there is no evidence for this trip other than a drawing of an Italian landscape by Gillis. On 4 October 1596 or 1597 Gillis van Valckenborch married Barbara van Hilden of Frankfurt. The couple had many children of whom their son Gillis the younger became a painter. Gillis the elder was accepted as a burgher of Frankfurt am Main on 24 February 1597. Just like his brother Frederik he was required to undergo a theological test before he was admitted as a burgher since they were suspected of being Gnesio-Lutherans. He remained active in his adopted hometown where he died.

== Work ==
Gillis van Valckenborch left only seven fully signed and dated paintings. His Defeat of Sanherib in the Herzog Anton Ulrich Museum is one of his fully signed paintings. His known oeuvre of about 40 works has been attributed on the basis of his few signed paintings. He worked in a late Mannerist style.

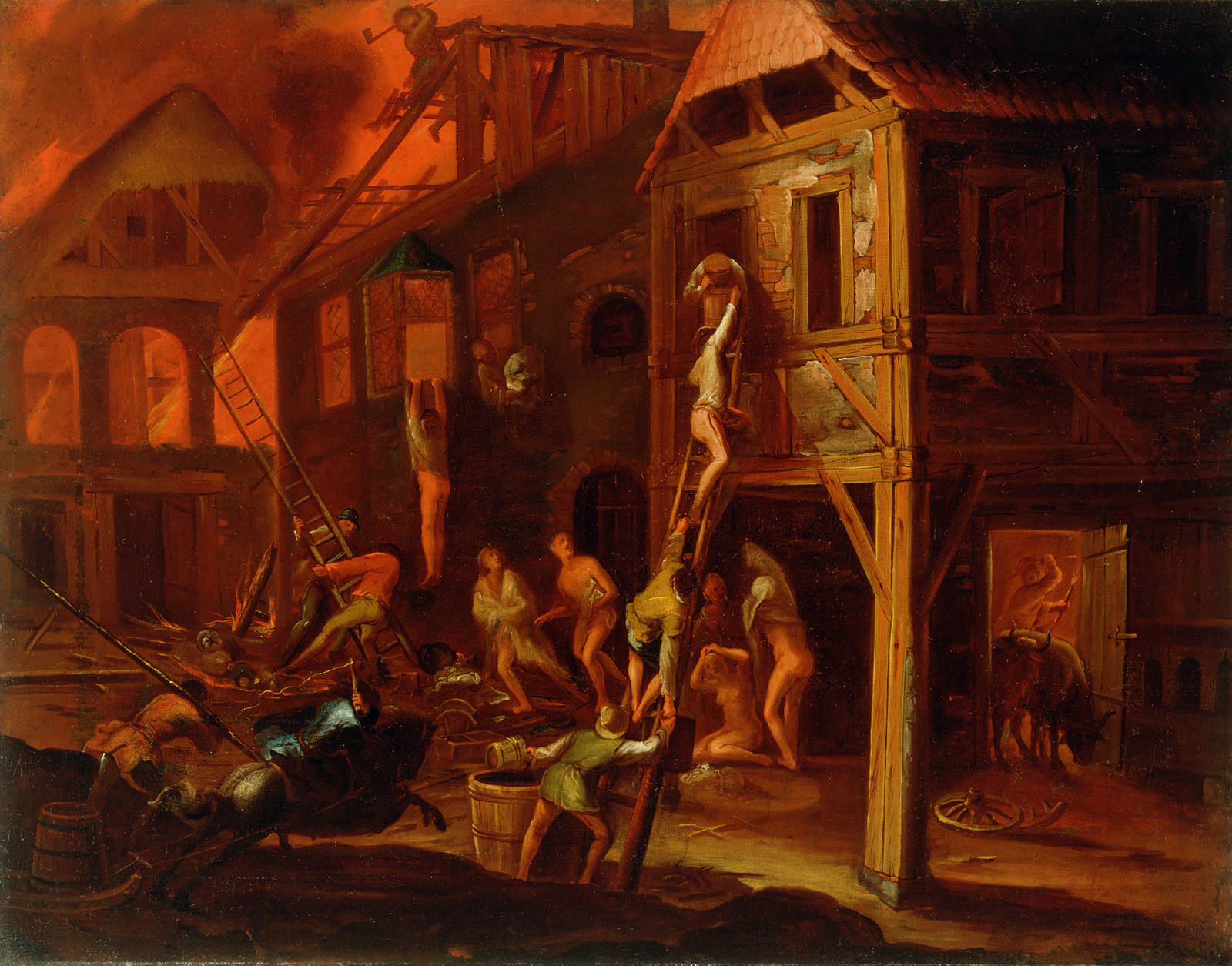
Fire in a Village

Gillis van Valckenborch painted biblical and mythological scenes and figures, as well as protagonists from Greek and Roman history set in landscapes. Gillis van Valckenborch's many large-scale compositions are populated by an abundance of dynamic figures. Most of his surviving works are on large canvases of an oblong format, a type also favoured by his uncle Lucas. A characteristic feature of his work is the lively colouring, for which he primarily used pink and light blue hues. He often returned to the theme of the Feast of the Gods. The most famous rendering of this theme is kept in the collection of Count Schönborn-Wiesentheit in Pommersfelden castle. He drew inspiration from the innovative works by the School of Prague such as Bartholomeus Spranger and the movement of international Mannerism.

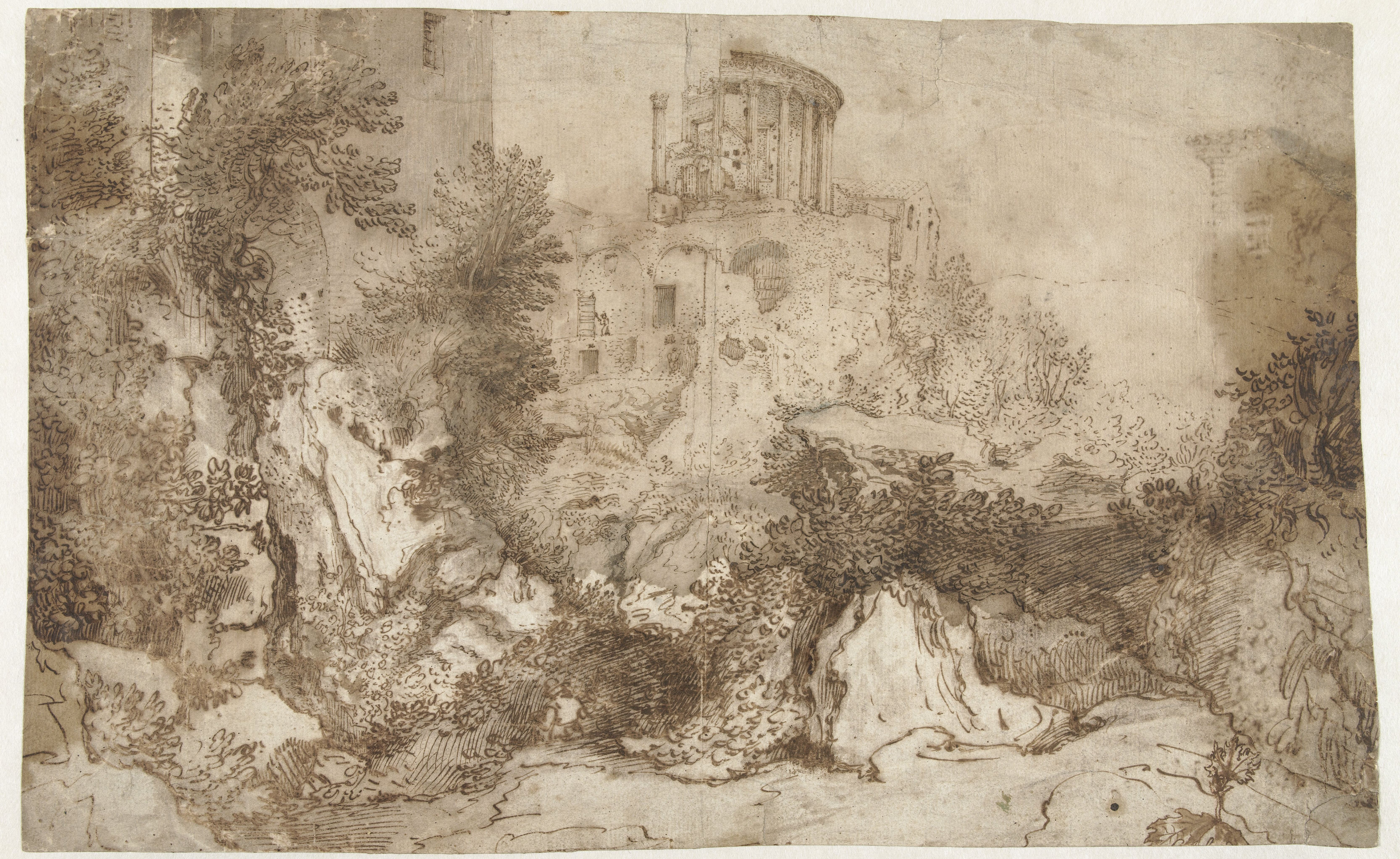
Temple of Sybil in Tivoli

Two pendant works depicting a scene of a fire in a village in the National Gallery of Slovenia have been attributed to van Valckenborch based on the traditional record Valkenburg, with which the paintings were catalogued in the Landesbildergalerie in Graz, on the style, and also on the motif. The paintings show close affinity with Gillis' signed painting of "The Rescuing of the Israelites in the stadium of Alexandria" in the Herzog Anton Ulrich Museum in the presentation of the forms and in the brushwork, which interprets motifs and models of northern Mannerism. It is not entirely clear what the pendant paintings depict, whether it is some historical event, or that they have some moral meaning such as fire as punishment for the sinners carousing in the tavern in one of the paintings. That fire was one of his favourite motifs is testified by a lost painting said to have depicted The Burning of Troy, which was also in the Herzog Anton Ulrich Museum until 1714.
