= 1648 in art =

Events from the year 1648 in art.

== Events ==
- Académie royale de peinture et de sculpture founded in Paris.
- Carlo Ridolfi publishes a biography of Titian and other Venetian artists, Le maraviglie dell'Arte ovvero, Le vite degli Illustri Pittori Veneti e dello Stato.

== Paintings ==
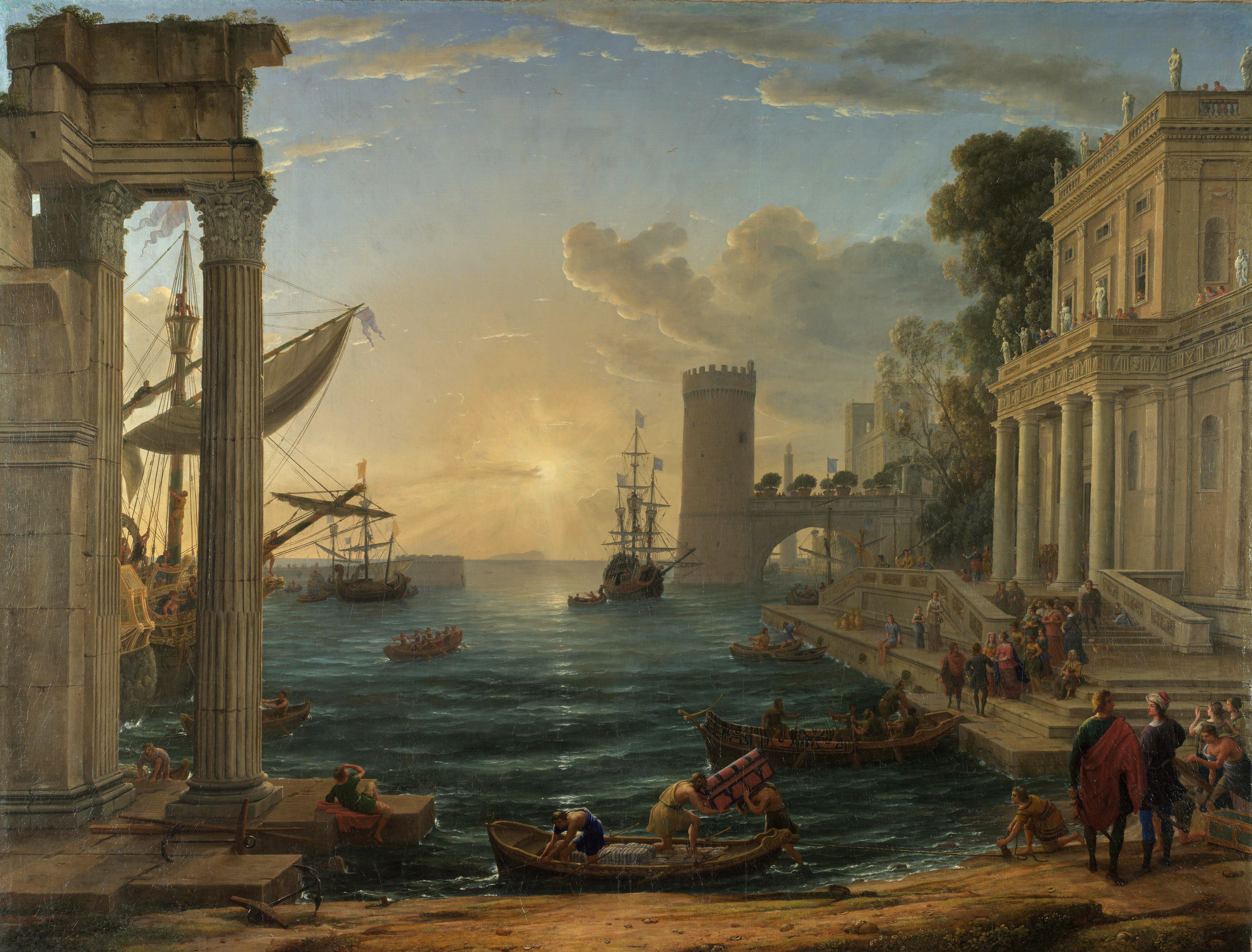
Claude - The Embarkation of the Queen of Sheba

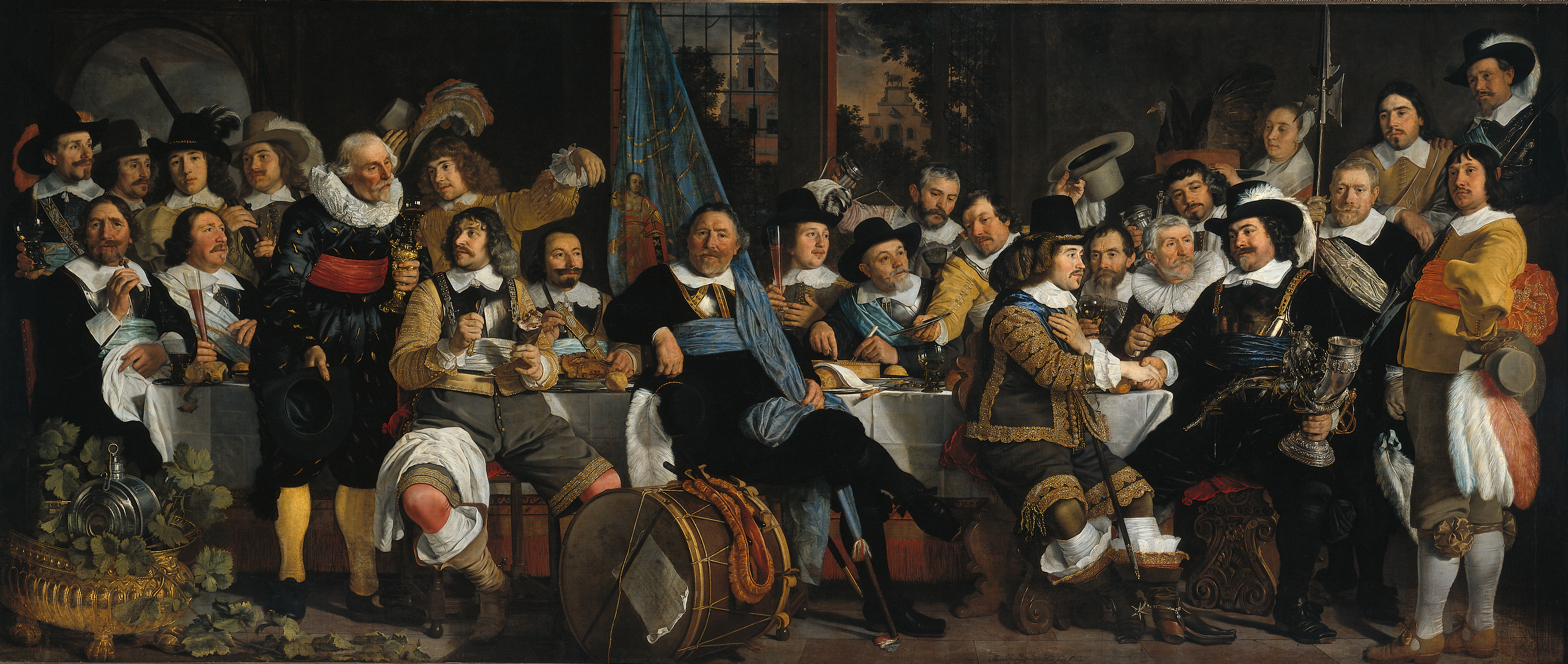
van der Helst - Banquet of the Amsterdam Civic Guard

- Claude Lorrain
  - Seaport with The Embarkation of the Queen of Sheba
  - Landscape with Dancing Figures (The Mill)
  - Landscape with Paris and Oenone
  - Marriage of Isaac and Rebekah
- Peter Lely - Portrait of Charles I of England and the Duke of York
- Nicolas Poussin
  - The Funeral of Phocion
  - The Holy Family on the Steps
  - Landscape with the Ashes of Phocion
  - Rembrandt - Supper at Emmus
  - Seven Sacraments, Second series (completed)
- Rembrandt-Supper at Emmus
- Gerard ter Borch - The Ratification of the Treaty of Münster, 15 May 1648
- Bartholomeus van der Helst - Banquet of the Amsterdam Civic Guard in Celebration of the Peace of Münster

== Births ==
- March 31 - Sebastiaen van Aken, Flemish historical painter (died 1722)
- April 4 - Grinling Gibbons, English master wood carver (died 1721)
- May 23 - Johan Teyler, Dutch Golden Age painter and engraver (died 1709)
- August 22 - Gerard Hoet, Dutch painter (died 1733)
- October 29 - John Verelst, Dutch Golden Age portrait painter (died 1679)
- date unknown
  - Giovanni Raffaele Badaracco, Italian painter (died 1726)
  - Ambrogio Besozzi, Italian painter (died 1706)
  - Bartolomeo Bimbi, Florentine painter of still lifes (died 1723)
  - Gabriel de la Corte, Spanish painter (died 1694)
  - Marcantonio Franceschini, Italian painter of religious and mythological subjects (died 1729)
  - Jean Mauger, French medallist (died 1712)
  - Johannes Skraastad, woodcarver (died 1700)
- probable - Paul Strudel, Austrian sculptor, architect, engineer, and painter (died 1708)

== Deaths ==
- February - Lawrence Hilliard, English miniature painter (born 1582)
- May 25 - Antioine Le Nain, French painter of the Le Nain family of painters (born 1599)
- October 15 - Simone Cantarini, Italian painter and etcher of the Bolognese School of painting (born 1612)
- December - Peter Oliver, English miniaturist (born 1594)
- December 18 - Hendrick Goudt, Dutch painter (born 1583)
- date unknown
  - Francisco Agullo, Spanish painter (born unknown)
  - Cesare Bassano, Italian painter and engraver (born 1584)
  - Antonio de Puga, Spanish Baroque painter (born 1602)
  - Zacharias Paulusz, Dutch Golden Age portrait painter (born 1580)
  - Andries Jacobsz Stock, Flemish engraver, printmaker and illustrator (born 1580)
  - Jacob van Geel, Dutch Golden Age painter (born 1585)
  - Diego Vidal de Liendo, Spanish painter (born 1622)
