= 1582 in art =

Events from the year 1582 in art.

== Events ==
- The Book of Felicity is produced in the Ottoman Empire, for Sultan Murad III.

== Paintings ==
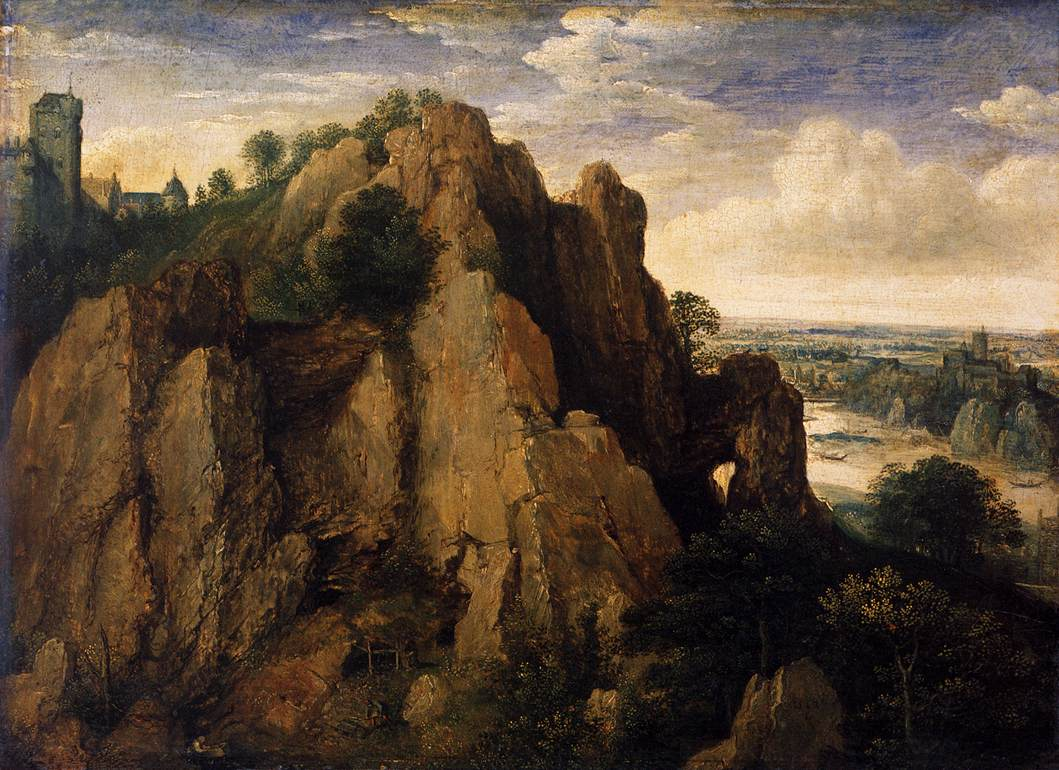
van Valckenborch – Mountainous Landscape, Rijksmuseum

- Federico Barocci - Entombment (Santa Croce, Senigallia)
- Robert Peake - Portrait of Anne Knollys
- El Greco
  - The Martyrdrom of Saint Maurice
  - Saint Peter in Tears
- Maso da San Friano - Christ Reborn
- Cherubino Alberti
  - The Presentation at the Temple
  - The Resurrection
  - The Holy Family
- Lucas van Valckenborch – Mountainous Landscape

== Births ==
- January 26 – Giovanni Lanfranco, Italian painter of the Baroque period (died 1647)
- August - Bartolomeo Manfredi, Italian painter, a leading member of the Caravaggisti (died 1622)
- date unknown
  - Wouter Abts, Flemish painter of conversation pieces and landscapes (died 1642/3)
  - Remigio Cantagallina, Italian etcher, active in the Baroque period (died 1656)
  - Francis Cleyn, German painter and tapestry designer (died 1658)
  - Jacob Franquart, Flemish painter, court architect and copper plate engraver (died 1651)
  - Lawrence Hilliard, English miniature painter (died 1648)
  - Vespasiano Strada, Italian painter and engraver of the early-Baroque period (died 1622)
  - Richard Tassel, French painter (died 1660)
  - David Teniers the Elder, Flemish painter (died 1649)
- probable
  - Frans Hals, Dutch Golden Age painter (died 1666)

== Deaths ==
- December 15 - Giorgio Ghisi, Italian coppersmith, painter, and engraver (born 1512/1520)
- date unknown
  - Leonardo Brescia, Italian painter (born 1481)
  - Francesco da Urbino, Italian painter (born 1545)
