= Agullo =

Agullo is a surname. Notable people with the surname include:

- Francisco Agullo (died 1648), a Spanish painter
- Thierry Agullo, one of the early participants on the Sociological art movement

Agulló is the surname of a now-extinct Valencian family of the Spanish nobility:

- Francisco Agulló y Cebrian (1720s–1780s), Spanish nobleman
- José Agulló Sánchez Bellmont (1774–1824), Spanish nobleman
- José Joaquín Agulló, Count of Ripalda (1810–1878), Spanish politician

== See also ==
- Guillem Agulló i Salvador, a Valencian member of the independentist political organization Maulets
- Horacio Agulla, an Argentine rugby union player.
