= 1545 in art =

Events from the year 1545 in art.

== Works ==
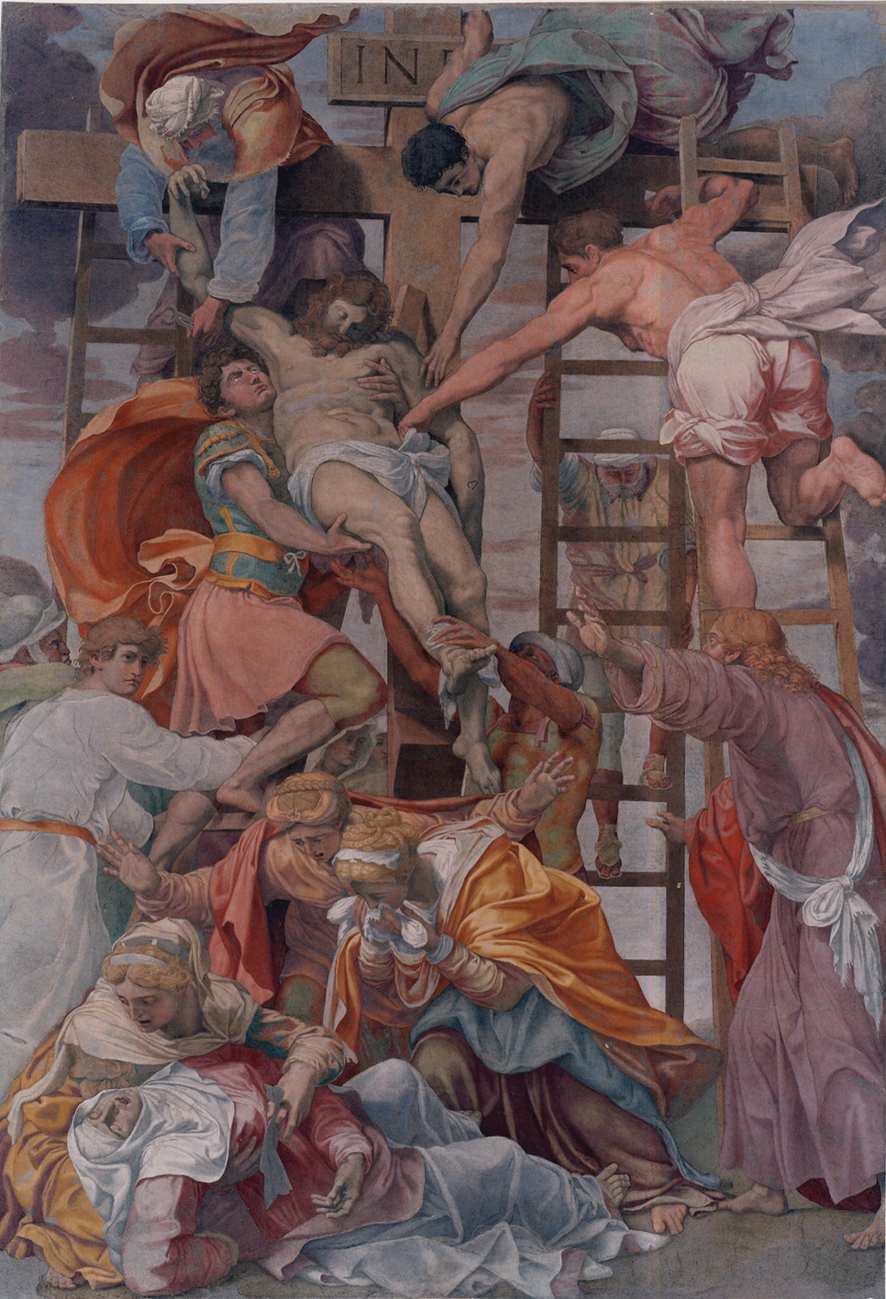
da Volterra, Descent from the Cross

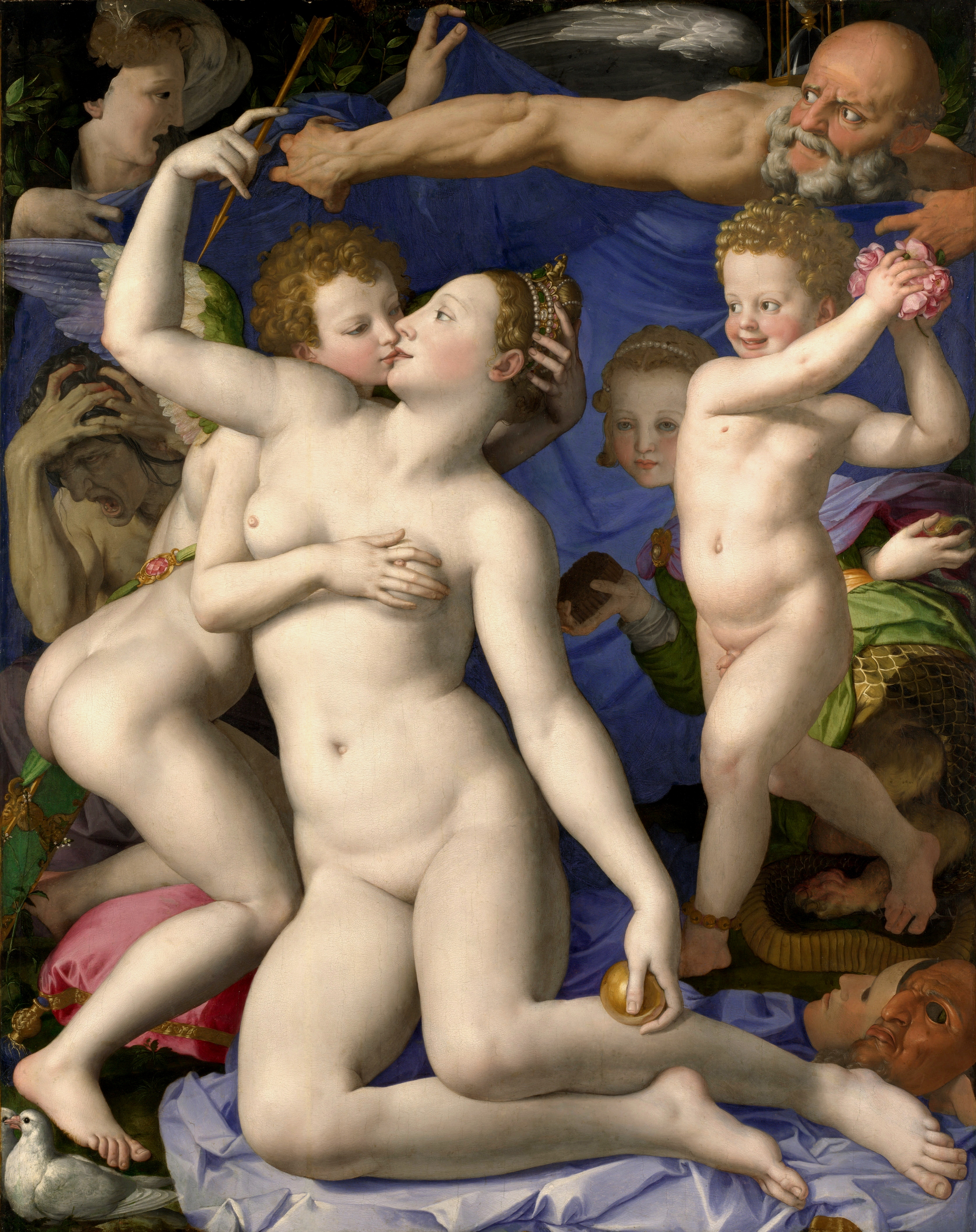
Bronzino, Venus, Cupid, Folly and Time

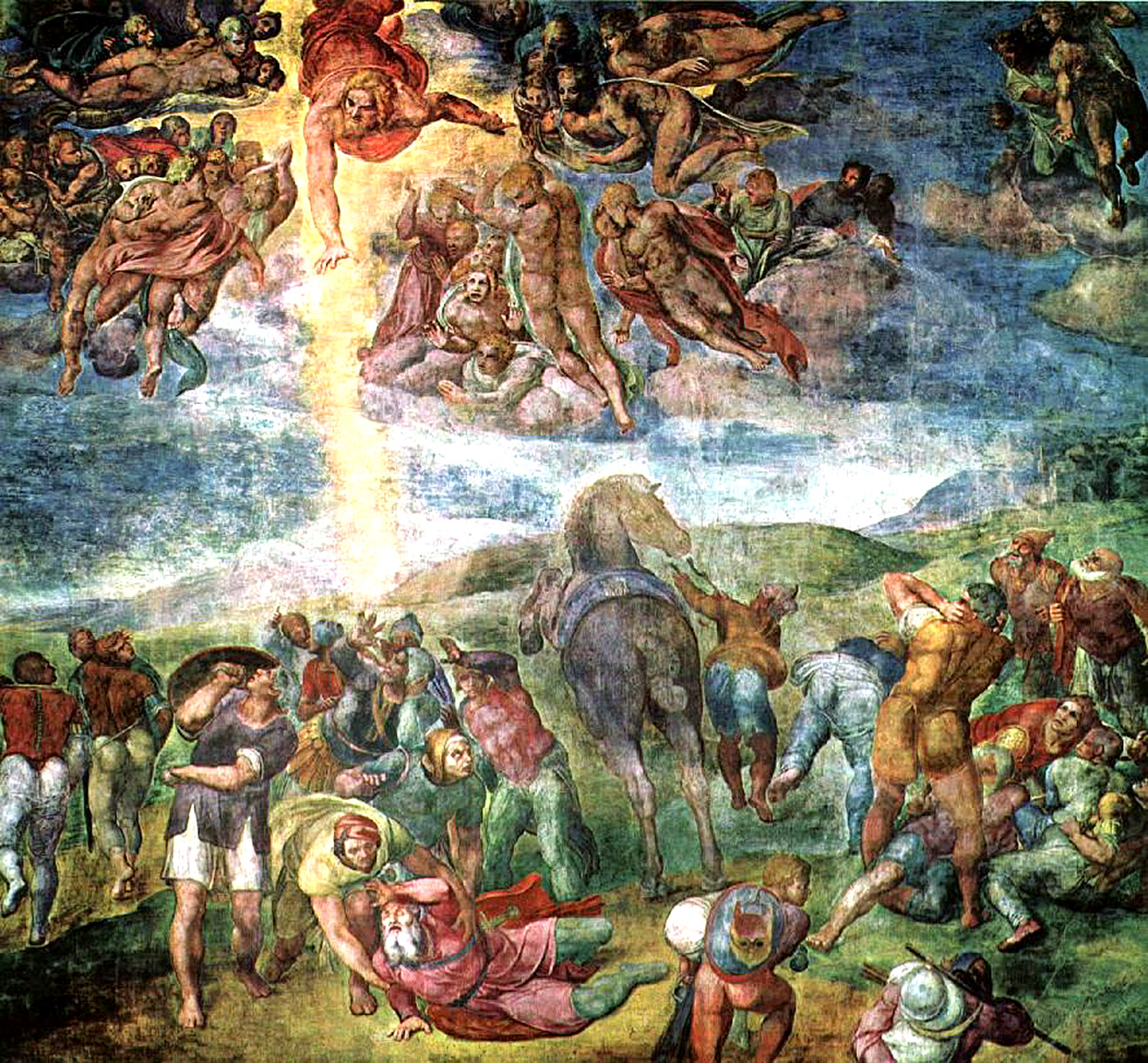
Michelangelo, The Conversion of Saul

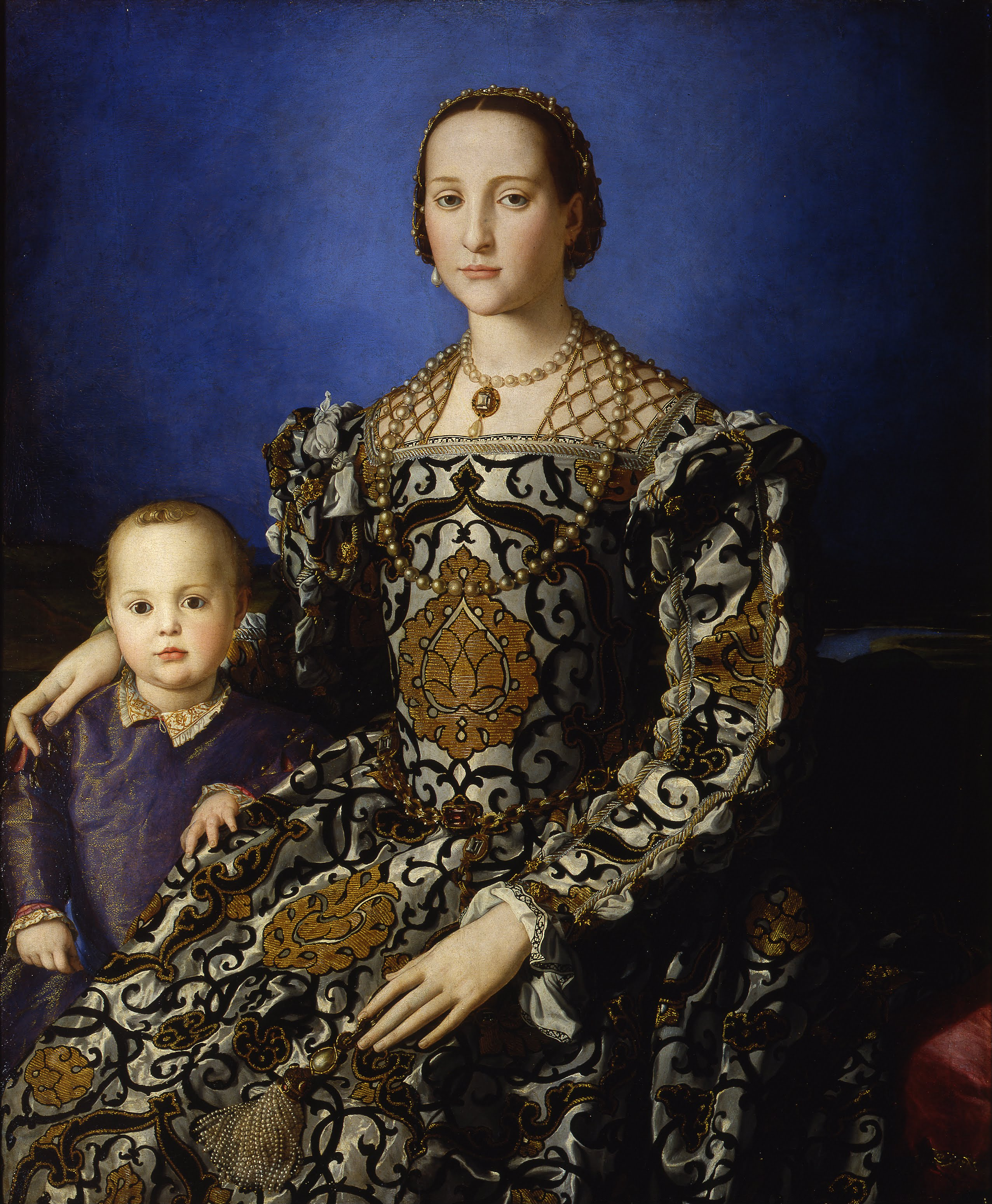
Bronzino, Eleanor of Toledo with her son Giovanni

=== Paintings ===
- Bronzino
  - Eleanor of Toledo with her son Giovanni de' Medici
  - Portrait of Cosimo I de' Medici
  - Portrait of Giovanni de' Medici as a Child
  - Venus, Cupid, Folly and Time
- Lucas Cranach the Younger – The Conversion of St. Paul
- Gerlach Flicke – Thomas Cranmer
- Master John – Catherine Parr (approximate date)
- Michelangelo – The Conversion of Saul
- Francesco de' Rossi (Il Salviati) – Triumph of Camillus (fresco for Cosimo I de' Medici in Sala dell'Udienza, Palazzo Vecchio, Florence (completed))
- Titian – some dates approximate
  - Portrait of a Young Englishman
  - Portrait of Lavinia Vecellio
  - Portrait of Pietro Aretino
  - Portrait of Pope Paul III
- Daniele da Volterra (after drawings by Michelangelo) – Descent from the Cross (approximate date)

=== Sculpture ===
- (approx. date) – Hans Gieng of Fribourg completes work on the fountains of Bern in Switzerland.

== Births ==
- date unknown
  - Farrukh Beg, Mughal painter who served in the court of Muhammad Hakim (died 1615)
  - Francesco da Urbino, Italian painter (died 1582)
  - Hans Collaert, Flemish engraver and draughtsman (died 1628)
  - Frans Pourbus the Elder, Flemish Renaissance painter primarily of religious and portraits (died 1581)
  - William Rogers, English engraver (died 1604)
  - Marco Vecellio, Italian painter, nephew of Titian (died 1611)
  - Juan Zariñena, Spanish painter (died 1634)

== Deaths ==
- September - Hans Baldung, German Renaissance artist as painter and printmaker in woodcut (born 1484)
- date unknown
  - Alejo Fernandez, Spanish painter best known for his portrait of Christopher Columbus (born 1475)
  - Rueland Frueauf the Younger - German Late-Gothic painter (born 1470)
  - Albrecht Glockendon II, German miniaturist and woodcutter (born ca. 1495)
  - Vicente Juan Masip - Spanish painter of the Renaissance period (born 1475)
  - Wang E, Chinese landscape painter (born 1465)
