= Michelangelo and the Medici =

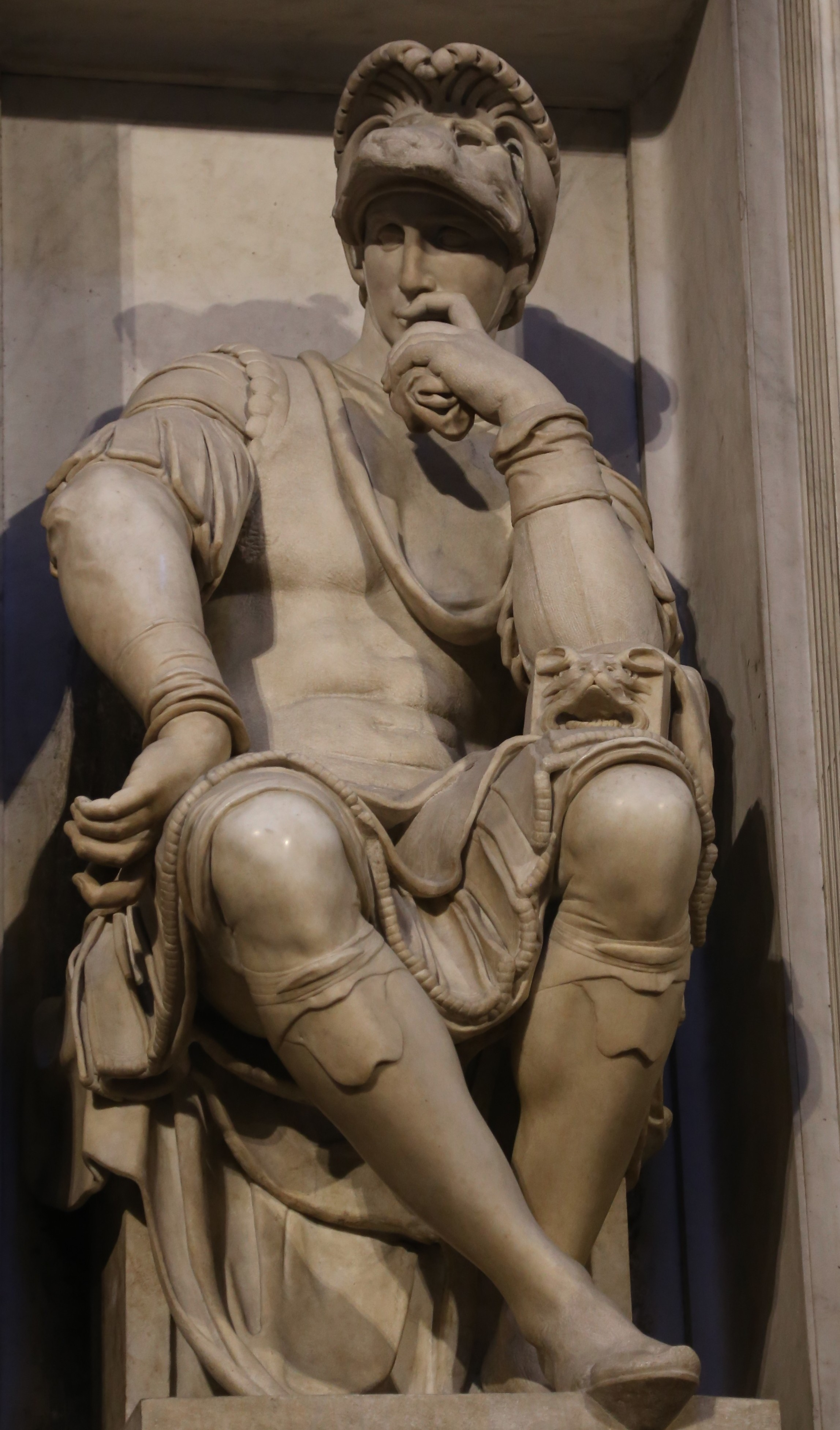
Detail of the Tomb of Lorenzo de' Medici, Duke of Urbino, in the Medici Chapel

Michelangelo (6 March 1475 – 18 February 1564) had a complicated relationship with the Medici family, who were for most of his lifetime the effective rulers of his home city of Florence. The Medici rose to prominence as Florence's preeminent bankers. They amassed a sizable fortune some of which was used for patronage of the arts. Michelangelo's first contact with the Medici family began early as a talented teenage apprentice of the Florentine painter Domenico Ghirlandaio. Following his initial work for Lorenzo de' Medici, Michelangelo's interactions with the family continued for decades including the Medici papacies of Pope Leo X and Pope Clement VII.

Despite pauses and turbulence in the relationship between Michelangelo and his Medici patrons, it was commissions from the Medici Popes that produced some of Michelangelo's finest work, including the completion of the tomb of Pope Julius II with its monumental sculpture of Moses, and The Last Judgement, a complex fresco covering the altar wall of the Sistine Chapel (the earlier Sistine Chapel ceiling was not a Medici commission).

== Beginnings with the Medici ==
Michelangelo's father sent him to study grammar with the Renaissance humanist Francesco da Urbino in Florence as a young boy. The young artist, however, showed no interest in his schooling, preferring to copy paintings from churches and seek the company of painters. At thirteen, Michelangelo was apprenticed to the painter Domenico Ghirlandaio. When Michelangelo was only fourteen, his father persuaded Ghirlandaio to pay his apprentice as an artist, which was highly unusual at the time. When in 1489 Lorenzo de' Medici ("Lorenzo il Magnifico), de facto ruler of Florence, asked Ghirlandaio for his two best pupils, Ghirlandaio sent Michelangelo and Francesco Granacci. Lorenzo had taken notice of Michelangelo's unusual talent and, wishing to encourage him, proposed for Michelangelo to move into the palace and live there as his son to be educated along with the Medici children. Lorenzo even offered Michelangelo's father Lodovico a respectable position in the palace. Michelangelo was thrown into the midst of the Medici circle, where he was involved with poetry, science, philosophy, and art.

It was then that Michelangelo first began writing down his deepest thoughts in poetry, which he continued to do for the rest of his life. From 1490 to 1492, Michelangelo attended the Humanist academy which the Medici had founded. He absorbed Renaissance Neoplatonism through his direct contact with some of the great Renaissance humanist philosophers of the Medici Court. Consequently, both Michelangelo's outlook and his art were subject to the influence of many of the most prominent philosophers and writers of the day including Marsilio Ficino, Pico della Mirandola, and Angelo Poliziano. Michelangelo studied sculpture under Bertoldo di Giovanni. At this time Michelangelo sculpted the reliefs Madonna of the Steps (1490–1492) and Battle of the Centaurs (1491–1492). The latter was based on a subject suggested by Poliziano and was commissioned by Lorenzo de' Medici.

== Brief separation from the Medici ==
Lorenzo de' Medici's death on April 8, 1492, brought a reversal of Michelangelo's circumstances. Michelangelo left the security of the Medici court and returned to his father's house. In the following months he carved a wooden crucifix (1493), as a gift to the prior of the Florentine church of Santo Spirito, who had permitted him some studies of anatomy on the corpses of the church's hospital. Between 1493 and 1494 he bought a block of marble for a larger than life statue of Hercules, which was sent to France and subsequently disappeared sometime around the 18th century. On January 20, 1494, after heavy snowfalls, Lorenzo's heir, Piero di Lorenzo de' Medici commissioned a snow statue, and Michelangelo again entered the court of the Medici. The Medici sixty-year reign came to an end under the reign of Piero Medici.

In the same year, the Medici were expelled from Florence as the result of the rise of Girolamo Savonarola. Michelangelo left the city before the end of the political upheaval, moving to Venice and then to Bologna, where he stayed for more than a year. In Bologna he was commissioned to finish the carving of the last small figures of the Shrine of Saint Dominic, in the church dedicated to that saint. According to Ascanio Condivi, Lorenzo di Pierfrancesco de' Medici, for whom Michelangelo had sculpted Saint John the Baptist, asked that Michelangelo "fix it so that it looked as if it had been buried" so he could "send it to Rome...pass [it off as] an ancient work and...sell it much better." Both Lorenzo and Michelangelo were unwittingly cheated out of the real value of the piece by a middleman. Cardinal Raffaele Riario, to whom Lorenzo had sold it, discovered that it was a fraud, but was so impressed by the quality of the sculpture that he invited the artist to Rome. This apparent success in selling his sculpture abroad as well as the conservative Florentine situation may have encouraged Michelangelo to accept the prelate's invitation.

Towards the end of 1494, the political situation in Florence was calmer. Upon his return to Florence, he found that things in the city had greatly changed. The city, previously under threat from the French, it was no longer in danger as Charles VIII had suffered defeats. Michelangelo returned to Florence but received no commissions from the new city government under Savonarola. He returned to the employment of the Medici. During the half year he spent in Florence he worked on two small statues, an infant Saint John the Baptist and a Sleeping Cupid.

== Under the Medici Popes ==
=== Leo X ===
The new Pope Leo X was no stranger to Michelangelo, being no other than his old schoolmate Giovanni di Lorenzo de' Medici, the second son of Lorenzo the Magnificent. Since Leo was a Medici, one of the projects that naturally occurred to him was the decoration of the unfinished front of his family's church, San Lorenzo, in Florence. His predecessor Brunelleschi finished the interior and he had to finish the façade. In fact, Leo X invited several architects to do so and he was not among the first. However, when he made the woodcut in December 1516, in January 1518 he was given Leo's approval. In anticipation of the project, he went out the quarries in Carrara, Italy to excavate granite and he spent two years building the road to it, supervising the extraction, and transporting the marble to Florence. The church facade was actually his first architectural task, and he had no experience of producing the working plans and measurements needed for his project. The blocks of marble used in columns, cornices, and other architectural features were different from the ones he used in his sculptures.

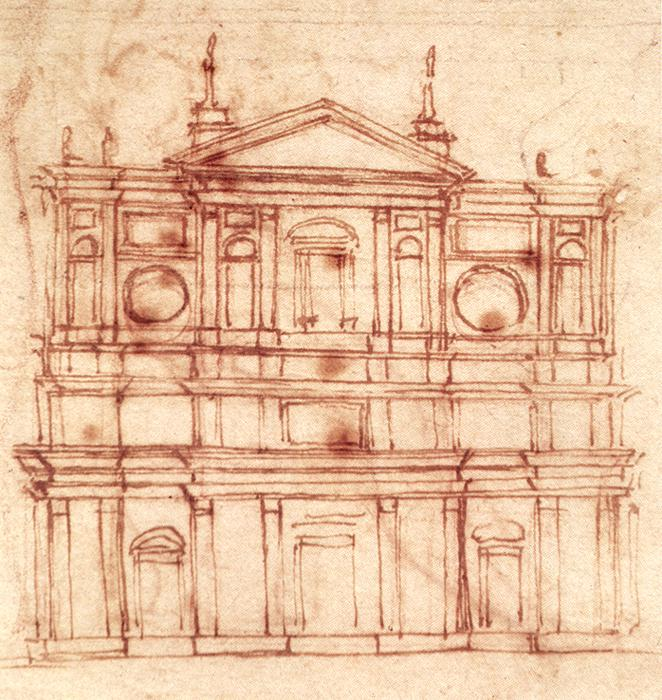
Michelangelo project for the façade of San Lorenzo, Florence

The three years he spent in creating drawings and models for the facade, as well as attempting to open a new marble quarry at Pietrasanta were specifically for the project. Unfortunately, the project was delayed because of the building of new roads to transport the marble. Pope Leo X wanted to use the marble in quarries at Seravezza. It was an abandoned quarry and therefore had no workers and roads there. His opinion on the subject was ignored and was instructed to move the operation to Seravezza. Because of that, he was unjustly accused of breaking his contract with Carrara. Also, when he argued with the pope about it, he was accused of favoring Carrara marble over Seravezza's.

After a delay of three years, the project was abruptly cancelled. The basilica lacks a façade to this day, and the reason for this cancellation remains a mystery to historians. However, it is still adorned by many people today. The Medici Chapel at San Lorenzo is the best example of the integration of the artist's sculptural and architectural vision since Michelangelo created both the major sculptures as well as the interior plan.

Ironically, the most prominent tombs are those of two rather obscure Medici who died young, a son and grandson of Lorenzo il Magnifico. Lorenzo himself is buried in an unfinished and comparatively unimpressive tomb on one of the side walls of the chapel, not given a free-standing monument, as originally intended. Instead of returning to Rome, Michelangelo remained in Florence and agreed to continue the construction of the Medici Chapel. The Medici Chapel has monuments in it dedicated to certain members of the Medici family. Michelangelo never finished it, so his pupils later completed it. Lorenzo il Magnifico was buried at the entrance wall of the Medici Chapel. Sculptures of the Madonna and Child and the Medici patron saints Cosmas and Damian were set over his sepulchre; of these the Medici Madonna was Michelangelo's own work. The concealed corridor with wall drawings of Michelangelo under the New Sacristy were discovered in 1976.

=== Clement VII ===
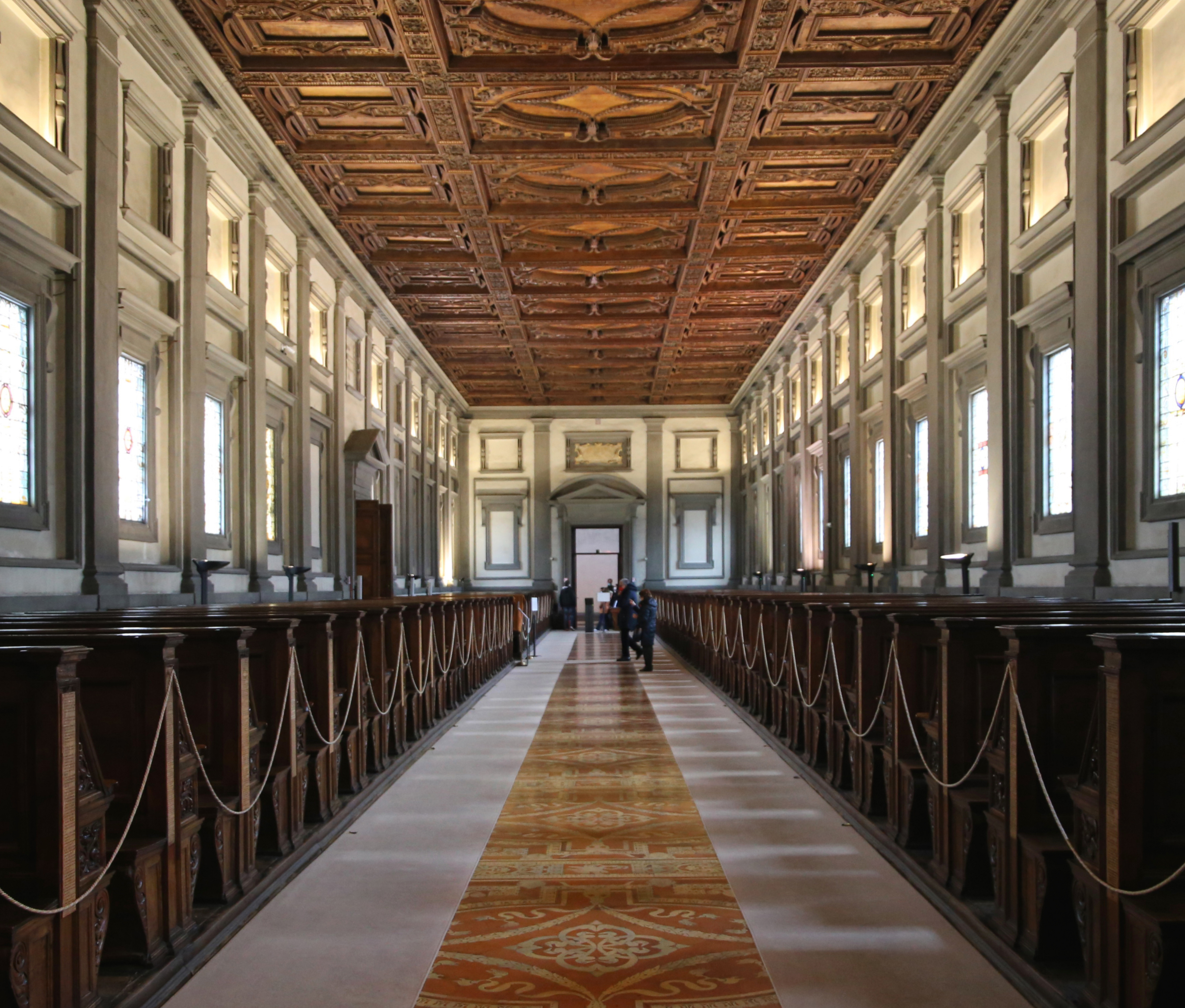
Reading room of the Laurentian Library

When Pope Leo X died, Adrian VI succeeded him but died within a year. He was succeeded by Pope Clement VII, the second Medici pope. Sophisticated, handsome, and intelligent, Pope Clement VII became one of Michelangelo's most important patrons – despite Vatican coffers running low during his papacy, due to the extravagances of previous popes and a string of international misfortunes.

Clement VII, also known as Giulio di Giuliano de' Medici, was the nephew of Lorenzo and the son of Giuliano de' Medici, who was assassinated in the Pazzi conspiracy in 1478. As with Leo X, Michelangelo was educated alongside Clement VII and for many years, the two communicated in great detail both via letter and in person. Despite that Clement VII was an illegitimate child, he became an archbishop via papal dispensation, in which Leo X stipulated that his parents had been secretly married. Thus, Giulio de' Medici was made cardinal in 1513 and in 1523 became pope. Numerous misfortunes occurred during his papacy, including the Sack of Rome, the English Reformation, and Martin Luther's ongoing Protestant Reformation.

Clement VII had plans to make the Laurentian Library public and in doing so, the Pope proposed creating a new building. Michelangelo was contracted and produced an amazing design but it was not carried out until he moved to Rome in 1525. In this project, Michelangelo produced new styles such as pilasters tapering thinner at the bottom, and a staircase with contrasting rectangular and curving forms. Michelangelo worked on these two projects off and on for the next thirteen years. Ultimately, it was finished after his death. Mere days before his own death, Clement VII commissioned Michelangelo to paint The Last Judgment in the Sistine Chapel.

== The legacy of Michelangelo after the Medici ==
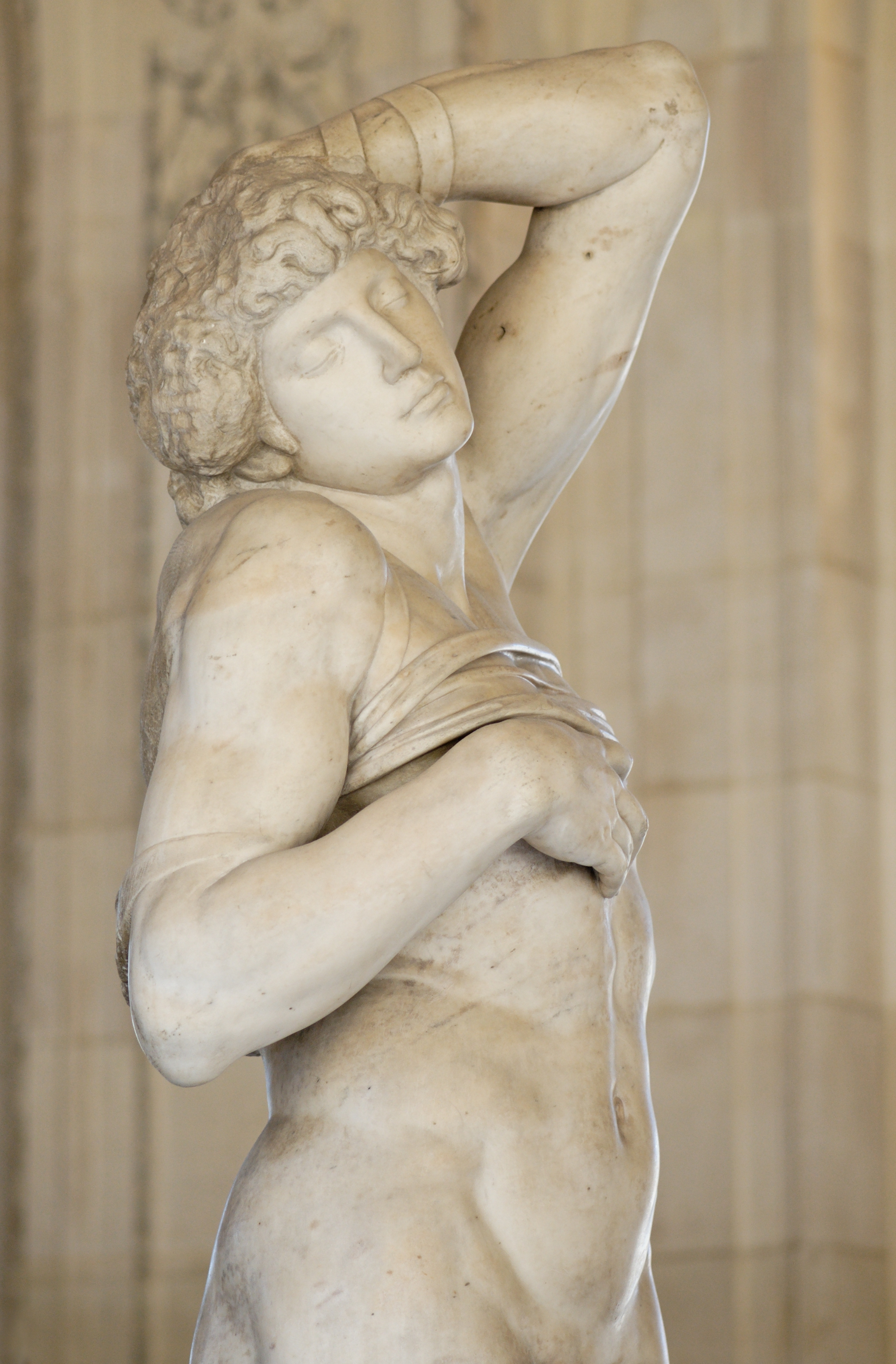
Michelangelo, Dying Slave, commissioned in 1505 for the tomb of Pope Julius II

In 1527, the Florentine citizens, encouraged by the Sack of Rome, threw out the Medici and restored the Republic. A siege of the city ensued, and Michelangelo went to the aid of his beloved Florence by working on the city's fortifications from 1528 to 1529. The city fell in 1530, and the Medici were restored to power. Completely out of sympathy with the repressive reign of the ducal Medici, Michelangelo left Florence for good in the mid-1530s, leaving assistants to complete the Medici Chapel. He left Florence for the last time at the age of sixty, leaving the Medici Chapel unfinished.

Michelangelo decided to settle in Rome, where he had hoped to finish Pope Julius II's tomb but was unable to do so, due to a new project that had been assigned to him by Pope Julius II. Thus Michelangelo set the tomb aside to paint a fresco in the Sistine Chapel. Michelangelo was commissioned to do the tombs of Lorenzo de' Medici's grandson, Giuliano, duke of Nemours and Lorenzo's third son, and popes Leo X and Clement VII, both Medici; also Lorenzo il Magnifico. Only two were completed: Giuliano's and Lorenzo's.

Although the construction of the monument of Pope Julius did not go according to plan, it was officially unveiled in February 1545. The original design had been cut down to something small and manageable with only three sculptures done by Michelangelo. Michelangelo, at seventy years old, had set a high standard for the following artists to come. People were already attempting to sum up his accomplishments and considering his place in history. From this time on, he was known as the "Divine Michelangelo", a living legend, the master of Italian Renaissance. Yet old though he was, in 1547, Pope Paul III appointed him chief architect of St. Peter's Basilica, which he would work on for the rest of his life. Michelangelo died of old age, leaving the project unfinished. Though he devoted the last seventeen years of his life to this task, Michelangelo refused to accept anything. He said he did it for the good of his soul. Years later his body was brought back from Rome for interment at the Basilica di Santa Croce, fulfilling his last request to be buried in his beloved Tuscany.

== See also ==
- Lives of the Most Excellent Painters, Sculptors, and Architects
- List of works by Michelangelo
