= José Joaquín Agulló, Count of Ripalda =

José Joaquín Agulló y Ramón de Sentís
- Count of Ripalda; Marquess of Campo Salinas; Baron of Tamarit
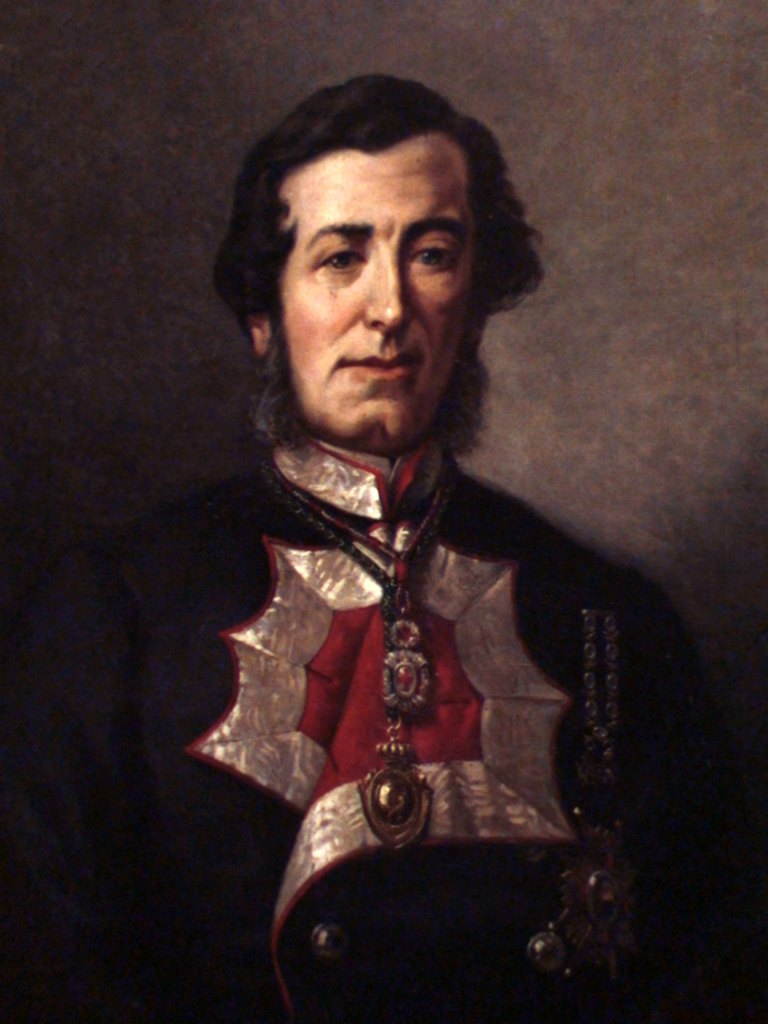
- Full name: José Joaquín Agulló y Ramón de Sentís Sánchez de Belmont y Ripalda
- Born: 1810; Valencia, Spain
- Died: 1878 (aged 67–68); Valencia, Spain
- Occupation: Minister

José Joaquín Agulló y Ramón de Sentís y Sánchez de Belmont y Ripalda (1810–1878) was a Spanish nobleman and politician, who held the titles of VI Conde de Ripalda, IV Marqués de Campo Salinas and Barón de Tamarit. He was the founder of the Spanish Red Cross, and Senator for life between 1864 and 1868.

== Biography ==
José Agulló was born in Valencia, the son of José de Agulló and Josefa Sánchez Bellmont, belonging to a distinguished Valencian family of Catalan and Navarrese roots. He was married to María Josefa Paulín y de la Peña, daughter of Roque de Paulin Quijano and María de la Peña Sánchez. They had three daughters, Dolores de Agulló y Paulín, (Countess of Ripalda), María de Agulló y Paulín and Isabel de Agulló y Paulín.

In 1860 José Joaquín Agulló, moves to England, to attend as official representative of Spain, in the International Statistical Institute held in London. In 1865 Agulló was appointed Minister of Agriculture, Industry and Commerce. He also was the co-founder of the Spanish Red Cross, and presided over the Real Academia de Bellas Artes de San Carlos de Valencia.

== Gallery ==
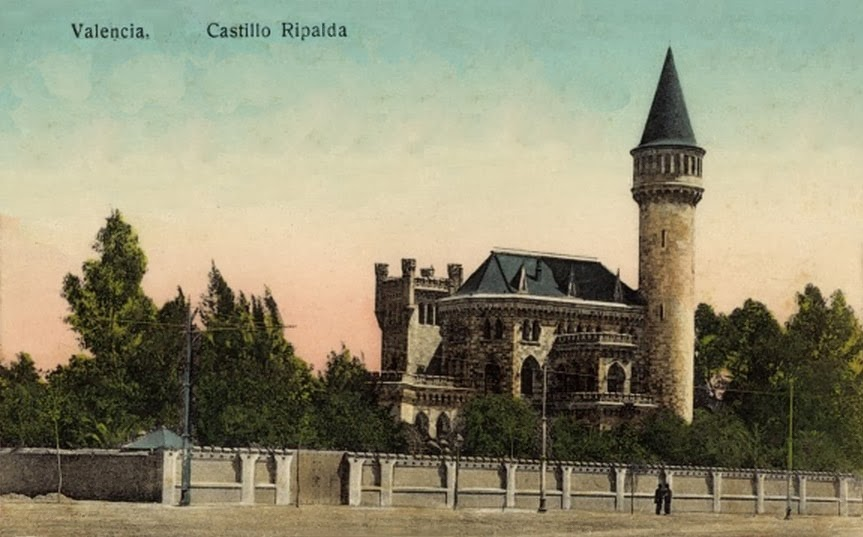
Palace of Ripalda

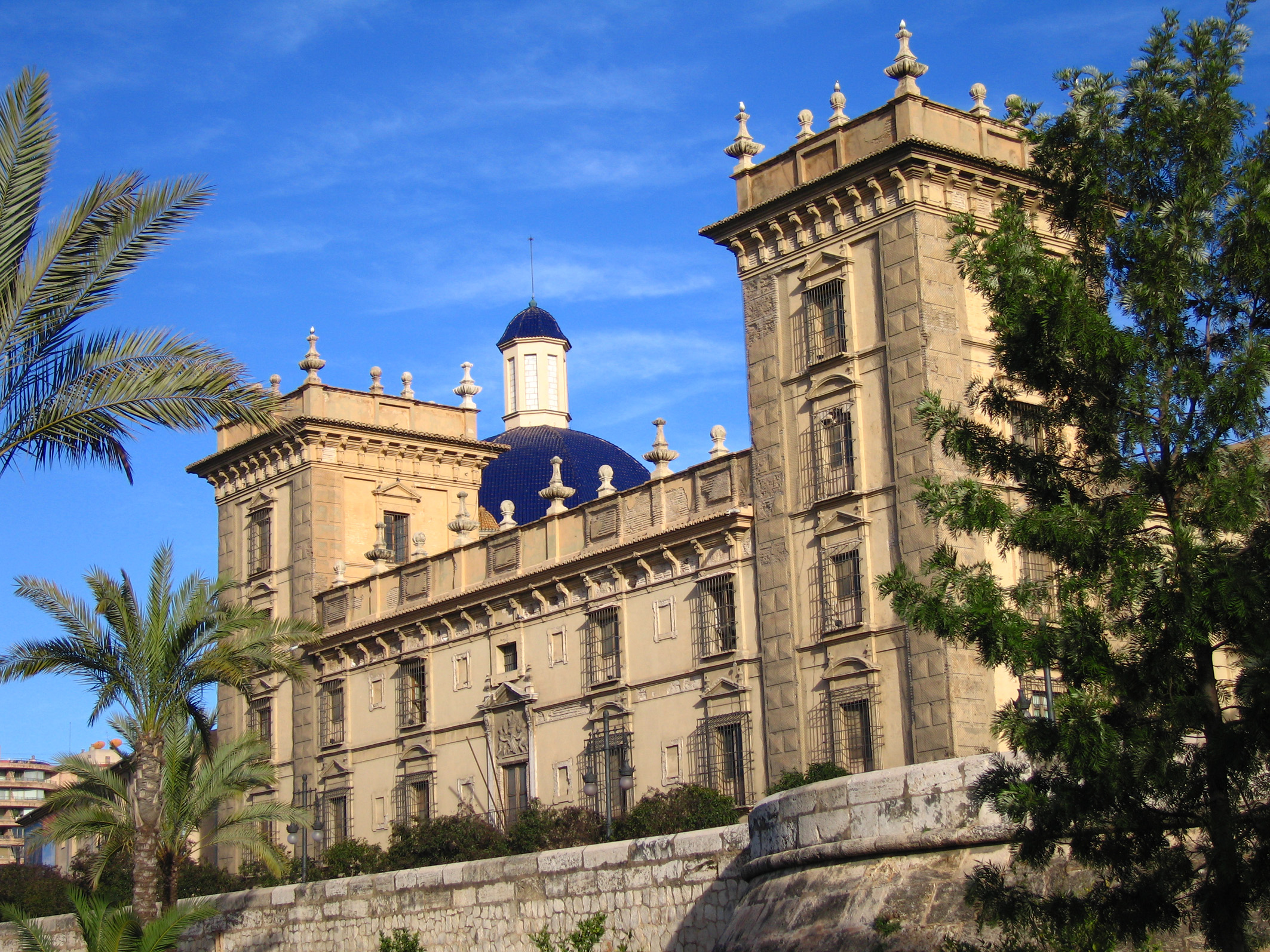
Academy of Fine Arts of San Carlos de Valencia
