= Lucas van Valckenborch =

Flemish painter (c. 1535–1597)

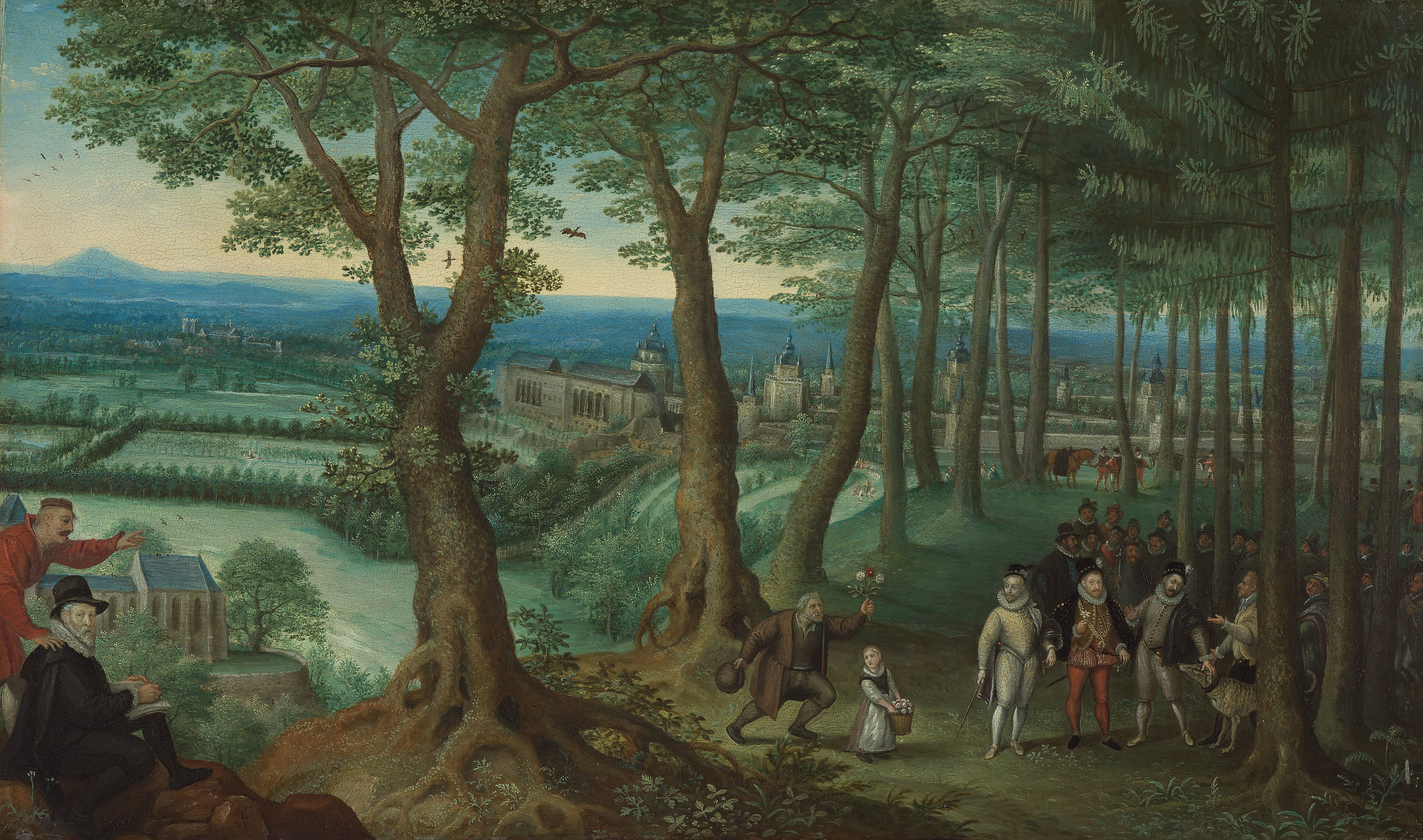
The Emperor's walk in the forest, with self-portrait

Lucas van Valckenborch or Lucas van Valckenborch the Elder (c. 1535 in Leuven – 2 February 1597 in Frankfurt am Main) was a Flemish painter, mainly known for his landscapes. He also made contributions to portrait painting, and allegorical and market scenes. Court painter to Archduke Matthias, the governor of the Spanish Netherlands in Brussels, he later migrated to Austria and then Germany, where he joined members of his extended family of artists who had moved there for religious reasons.

== Life ==
Lucas van Valckenborch was born in Leuven in what would become one of the most prominent Flemish families of artists. Spanning three generations, 14 artists are recorded in the family of whom his older brother Marten the Elder, and the sons of the latter, Frederik van Valckenborch and Gillis van Valckenborch, were the most important personalities.

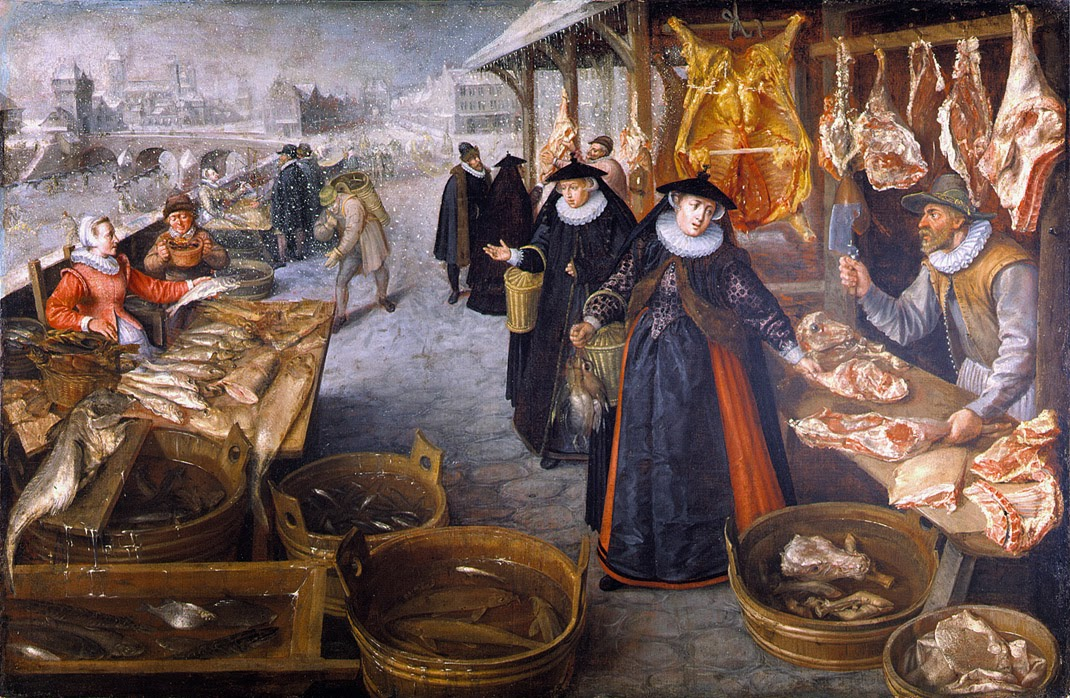
Meat and Fish Market (Winter)

On 26 August 1560, he entered the painters' guild of Mechelen, a city known at the time as a center for oil and watercolours and especially landscape painting. Its artistic milieu was influential in the development of Lucas van Valckenborch, who learned the technique of watercolour and met the prominent painters Pieter Bruegel the Elder (1528-1569) and Hans Bol (1534-1593), who both played important roles in the development of landscape painting in the Low Countries. The 17th-century biographer Karel van Mander reports that Lucas van Valckenborch learned to paint landscapes in Mechelen.

At the start of the iconoclastic fury of the Beeldenstorm in 1566, Lucas van Valckenborch left Antwerp with his brother Marten van Valckenborch, probably for religious reasons as they may have been protestant. A series of topographical views, including a 1567 painted view of Liège, prove van Valckenborch travelled up the Meuse valley. This trip played an important role in his development as a landscape artist, working directly from nature. In 1570, the artist was in Aachen, where he met up again with his brother Marten. Here, the two brothers were also joined, for two years, by Hans Vredeman de Vries, a friend and fellow artist.

By 1575, Lucas had returned to Antwerp, where he must have made a name for himself. Before 1579, the young Archduke Matthias of Austria, the governor of the Spanish Netherlands, hired him as his court painter. The Archduke was particularly impressed by his skills as a portrait painter. As court painter, Valckenborch, created in the Netherlands some works for the Archduke, including the designs for the Archduke's Guard and some portraits. After the Archduke lost his position as governor in 1582, the Archduke left the Netherlands and went to live in Linz without position. It is not clear when Lucas van Valckenborch joined the Archduke in Linz. Van Mander describes the pair traveling together down the Danube. There is no documentary evidence for this, but it is assumed he arrived in Linz, in 1582 or earlier, and stayed there until June 1582, at least. Two bills from Kremsmünster prove he actually spent time in Upper Austria.

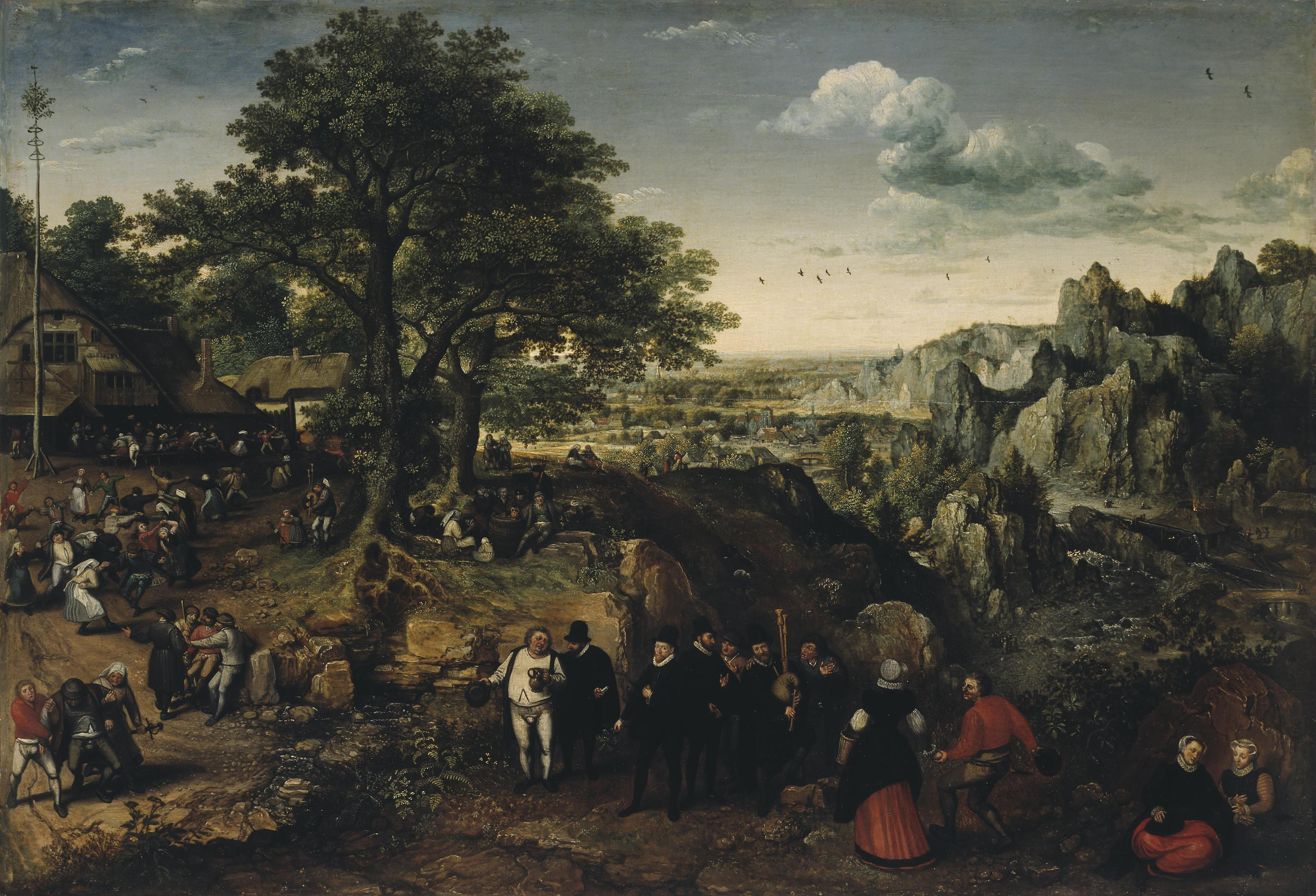
Landscape with a Rural Festival

At the beginning of 1593, Lucas van Valckenborch joined his brother Marten in Frankfurt am Main. Here, he became the teacher and collaborator of Georg Flegel. He remained active in Frankfurt until his death in 1597.

== Work ==
=== General ===
Lucas van Valckenborch is mainly known for his landscapes, which depict existing and imaginary scenes. He also painted portraits for his patron Emperor Matthias. He was also a figure painter as shown in a series of nine allegories of the seasons, painted in Frankfurt from 1592.

Valckenborch's earliest dated works are from 1567. His monogram was L / VV or LVV. Early in his career, he placed the 'L' below the two 'V's; while after 1570, he signed with the letters inverted.

His style was close to that of Pieter Brueghel the Elder, but he modified this influence in a personal manner and was not a slavish copyist. His work was rooted in the same Flemish tradition, without following the newer Mannerist movement.

=== Landscapes ===
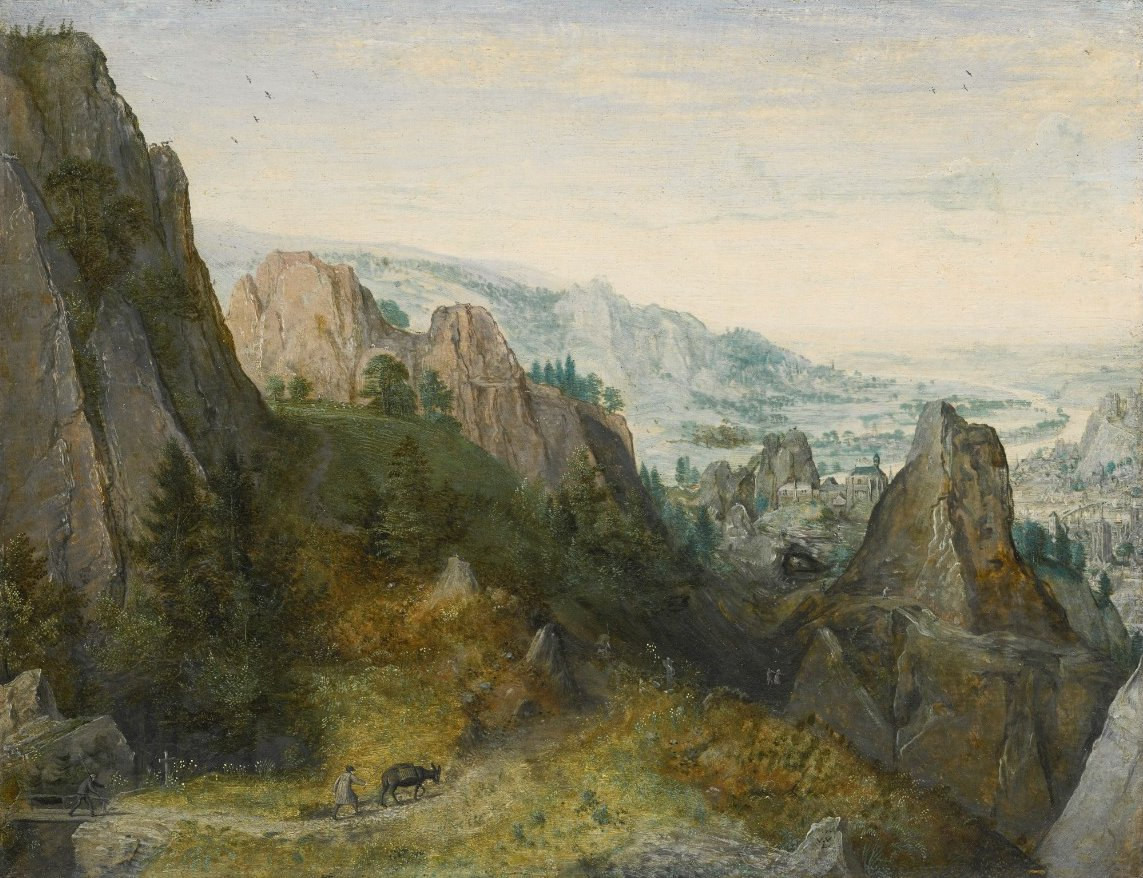
Rocky Landscape with Travelers on a Path

Van Valckenborch worked largely in the tradition of the so-called 'world landscape' of panoramic vistas shown from a bird's-eye viewpoint. This style of landscape painting was developed in Antwerp, in the first half of the 16th century by artists like Joachim Patinir, Herri met de Bles and Pieter Bruegel the Elder. It was also practised by Lucas van Valckenborch's contemporaries such as Gillis Mostaert and Gillis van Coninxloo. Van Valckenborch also painted topographically accurate landscapes. Joris Hoefnagel is believed to have used his topographical drawings, for instance the drawn View of Linz, for his designs for the six-volume atlas, the Civitates orbis terrarum, published by Georg Braun and Frans Hogenberg between 1572 and 1617.

Lucas van Valckenborch based many of his imaginary landscapes on drawings he had made directly from nature during his travels. The drawings provided a repertory of motifs, which he employed on multiple occasions. His landscape compositions, thus, often combined real places with imaginary elements. It is, therefore, not possible to locate many of the views he created. For instance, none of the many landscapes with furnaces and forges has ever been identified. A large portion of his landscape output was dedicated to the depiction of rocky landscapes, in which he situated ironworks or small religious or peasant scenes. Another recurring theme was that of rural entertainments such as in the Landscape with a Rural Festival (1577; Hermitage) or the two versions of the Landscape with a Peasant Wedding and Dance (both 1574, National Gallery of Denmark). He also created some close-up representations of forest landscapes.

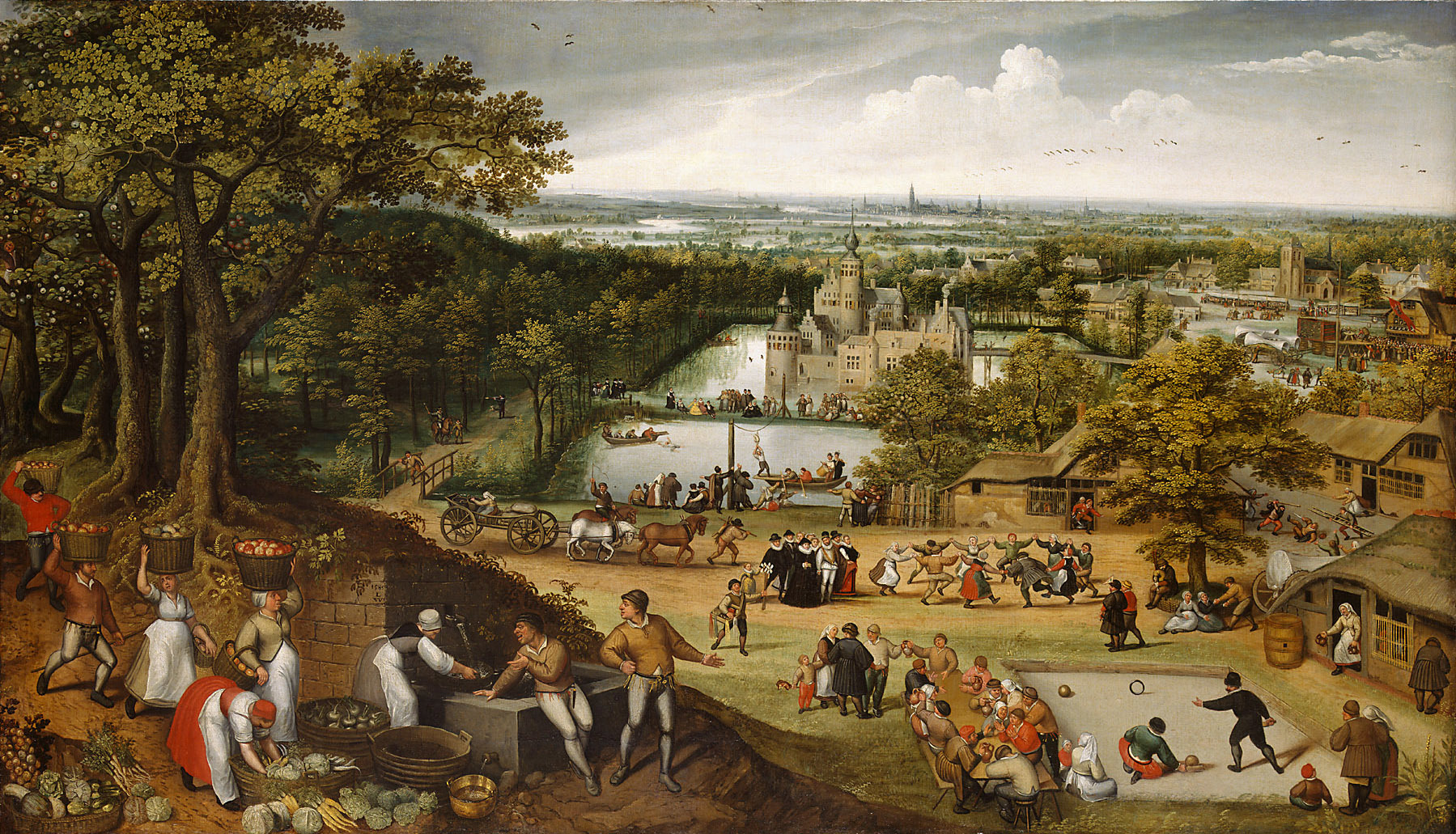
Autumn landscape (September)

In their mixture of fantasy and accurate topographical details, van Valckenborch's landscape paintings offer a view of the world and man's relationship to it. This is particularly clear in his rocky landscapes, in which the diminutive people on the winding path are reduced by the monumental cliffs. An example is the Rocky Landscape with Travelers on a Path (c. 1570, Sotheby's 6 July 2016, London lot 3), where the distant goatherd and the silhouettes of his charges seem ant-like in comparison to the vast distance, and the vertiginous perspective of the scene. This dramatic visual depiction is clearly intended as a commentary on man's place within the universe.

He also painted, between 1584 and 1587, a series of large pictures depicting the labours of the months, probably on commission for Archduke Matthias. These compositions, of which seven survive (five of which are in the Kunsthistorische Museum), present the various months of the year by showing the changing landscape and the traditional activities of humans during each month. It is not clear whether the five missing paintings were never painted or are lost. Due to their realistic setting, these compositions carry a documentary interest. The work of Pieter Bruegel the elder, who had painted a series of 6 on the times of the year, was influential on van Valckenborch. Lucas van Valckenborch moved away from the tradition of painting the landscape in three cascading distances that were rendered in three different colours: brown, green and blue for each receding plane. Rather he often left out the green tone for the middle distance. He also innovated the thematic scenes by developing them into genre scenes with a stronger narrative depth.

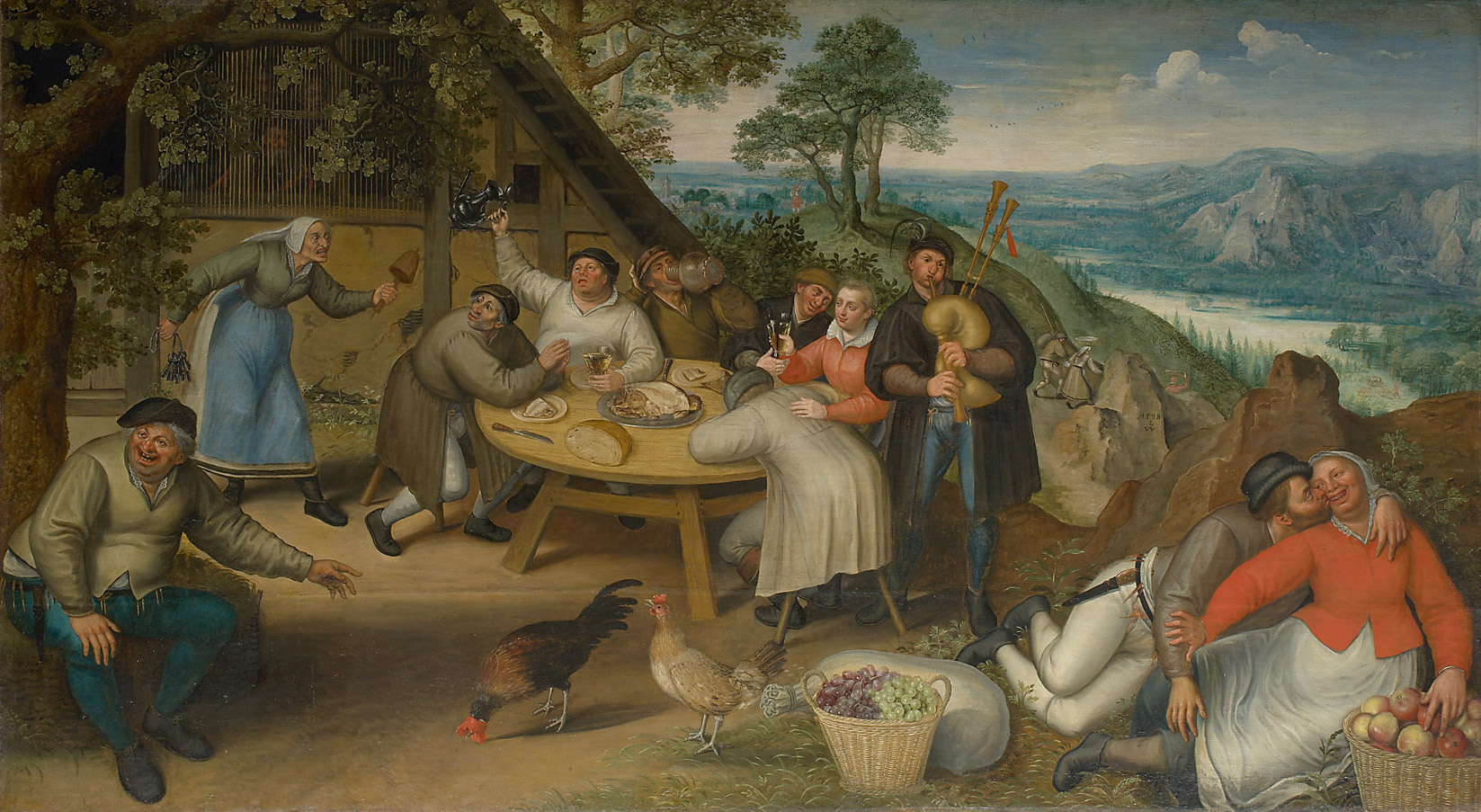
Peasant tavern

Lucas van Valckenborch regularly returned to the subject of the Tower of Babel, which was also depicted by Pieter Bruegel the Elder and later by a whole range of Flemish artists. The subject of the Tower of Babel is usually interpreted as a critique of human hubris, and, in particular, of the Roman Catholic Church which at the time was undertaking, at great expense, large-scale construction projects such as the St. Peter's Basilica. However, it has also been viewed as a celebration of technical progress, which would herald a better and more organized world.

=== Portraits ===
Archduke Matthias is said to have engaged Lucas van Valckenborch as his court painter for his skills as a portrait painter. Many of the works he produced for the Archduke were in fact portraits, including portraits of the Archduke and his wife Sibylle von Jülich-Cleve-Berg. These portraits were full-length portraits or bust format. He also painted several miniature portraits of the Archduke and his wife. It is clear that these portraits' role was to show the power of Archduke and to flatter his ego as he is depicted invariably in a regal and imposing position and dressed in the latest fashions.

Lucas van Valckenborch also included miniature portraits of himself and his friends in a number of his landscape paintings. This is the case, for instance in The Emperor's walk in the forest, where he has depicted himself on the left of the composition with his drawing tools. In the Landscape with a Rural Festival (1577; Hermitage), he included portraits of his friends Abraham Ortelius, Joris Hoefnagel and himself among the throng of revellers.

=== Market scenes ===
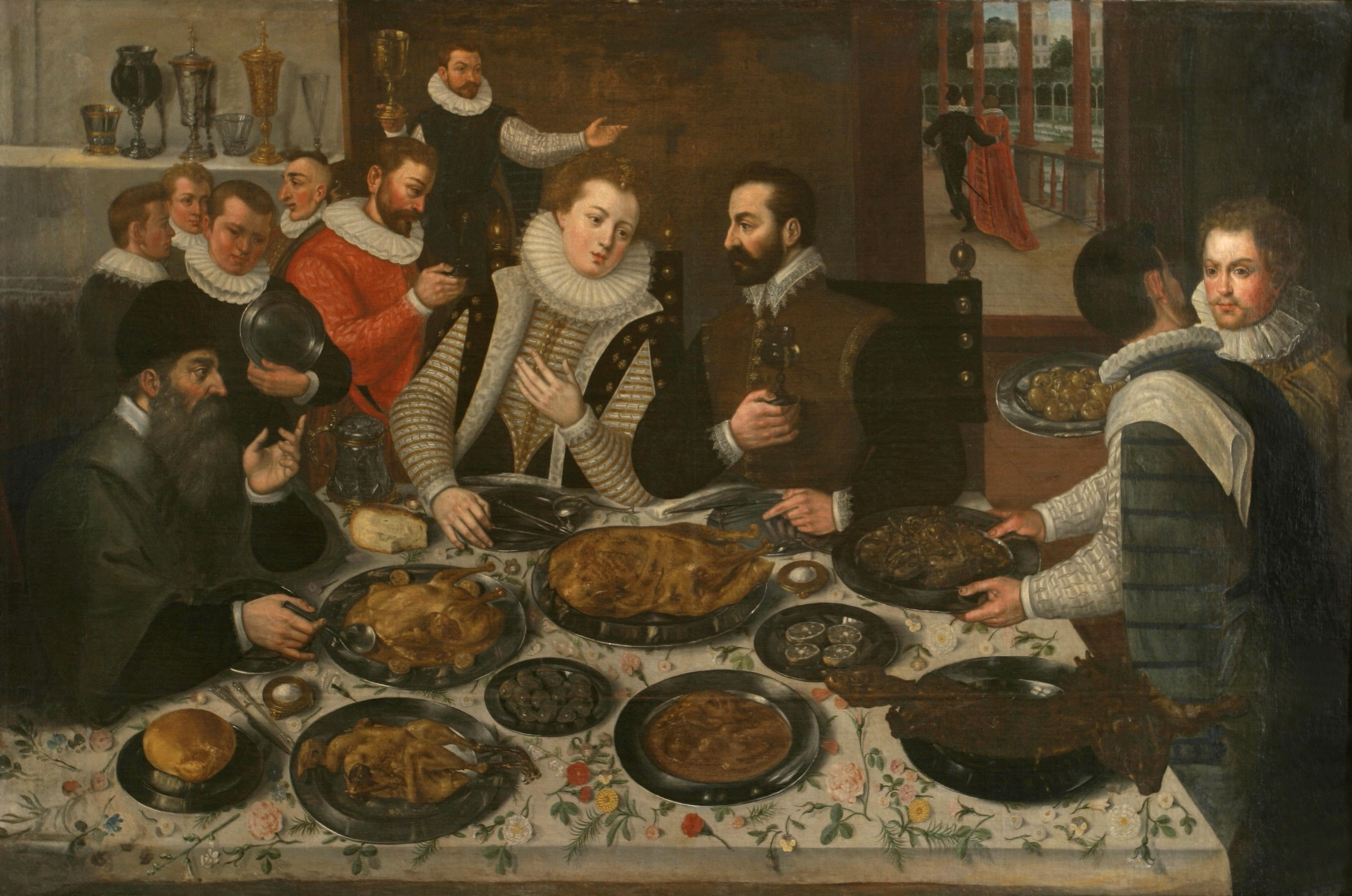
Feast

Lucas van Valckenborch painted a number of market scenes, which are also distinctively tied to the four seasons. The Meat and Fish Market (Winter) (c. 1595, Montreal Museum of Fine Arts) is an example of a market scene, which is also an allegory of winter. The work was likely part of a series of four dedicated to the seasons. The imagery of the market scenes can be traced back to the previous generation of painters from the Antwerp school. In the series, van Valckenborch particularly developed the tradition of art market scenes pioneered by Pieter Aertsen and Joachim Beuckelaer. He strived for a synthesis of still-life with landscape and genre painting.

The still lifes in many of the market scenes were the work of his assistant Georg Flegel who may also have trained with him. A snow-covered fish market scene (Royal Museum of Fine Arts Antwerp) is another example of a market scene set in the winter. People are shown skating on the ice in the background. Two muffled-up well-to-do women are making their purchases dressed in the typical Brabant style of around 1580–1600. The fishmonger is shown slicing off pieces of salmon, while his wife is taking smoked fish from a hook. The fish and utensils in the foreground are the work of Flegel who was able to render the fine metal shine of the brass bucket and the grain of the wooden water bucket. Georg Flegel also painted the food and luxurious tableware in two paintings of van Valckenborch depicting banquets (Silesian Museum and St Gilgen-Salzburg, H. Wiesenthal private collection).

== Gallery ==
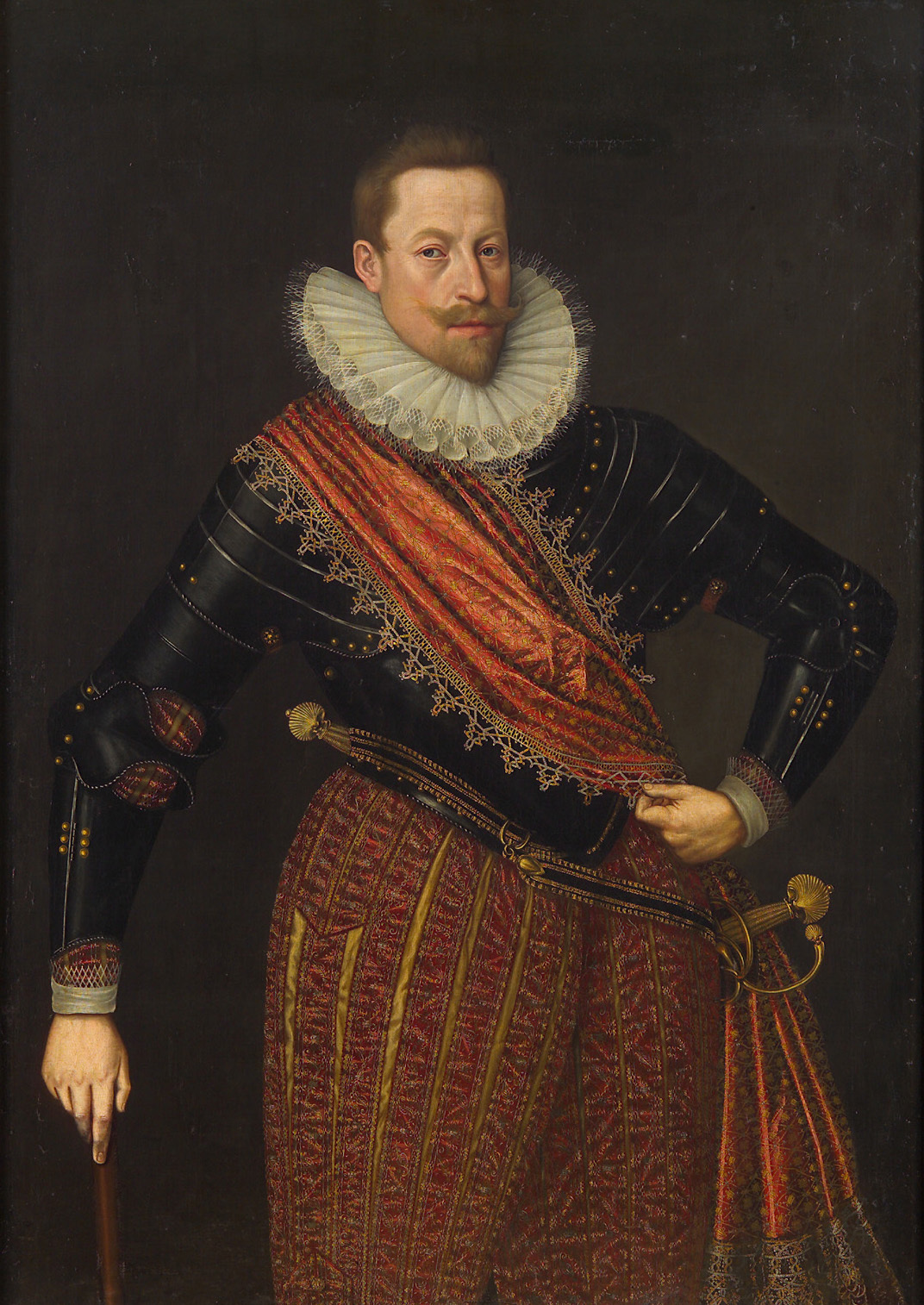
Portrait of Matthias of Austria

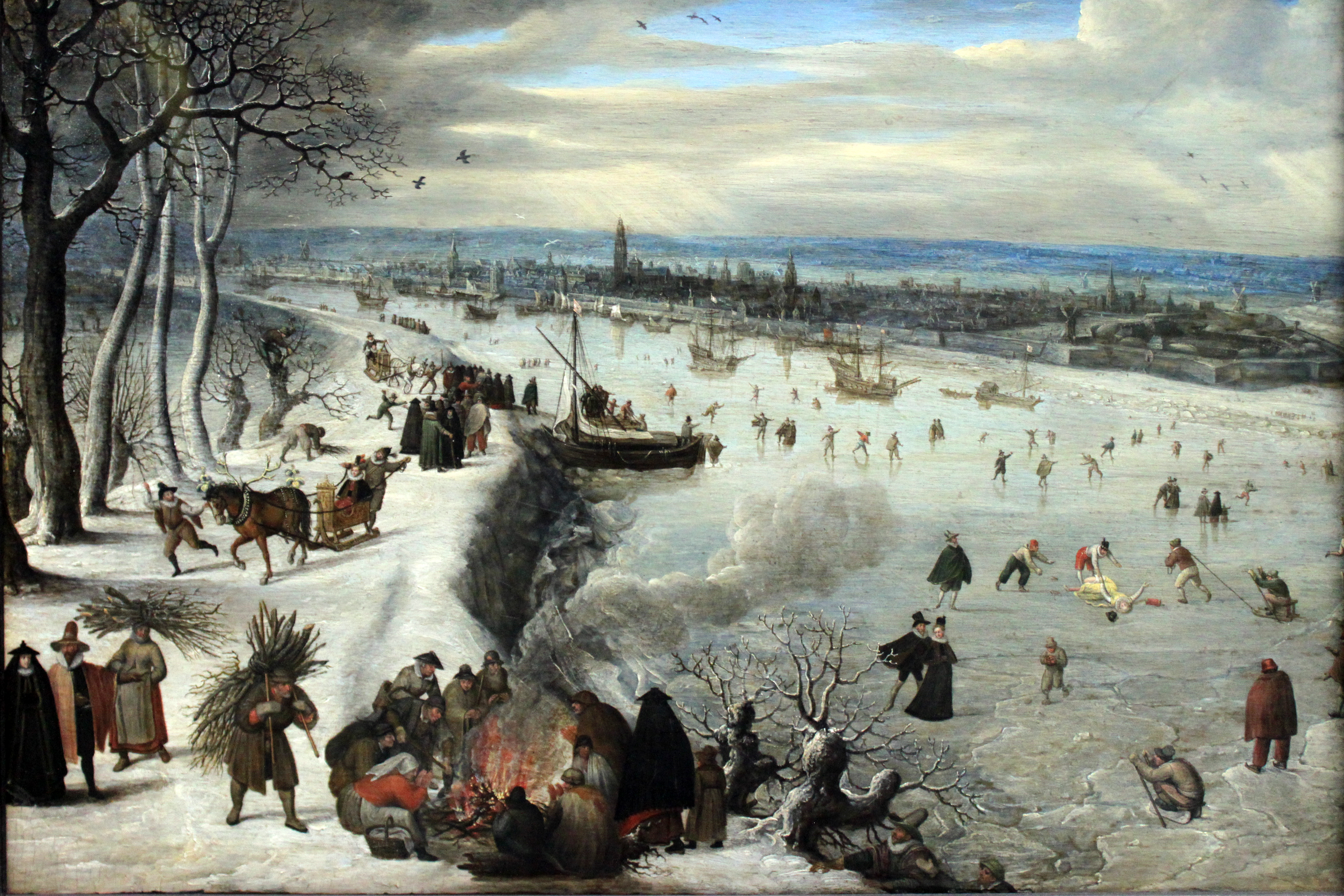
View of Antwerp with the Frozen Scheldt

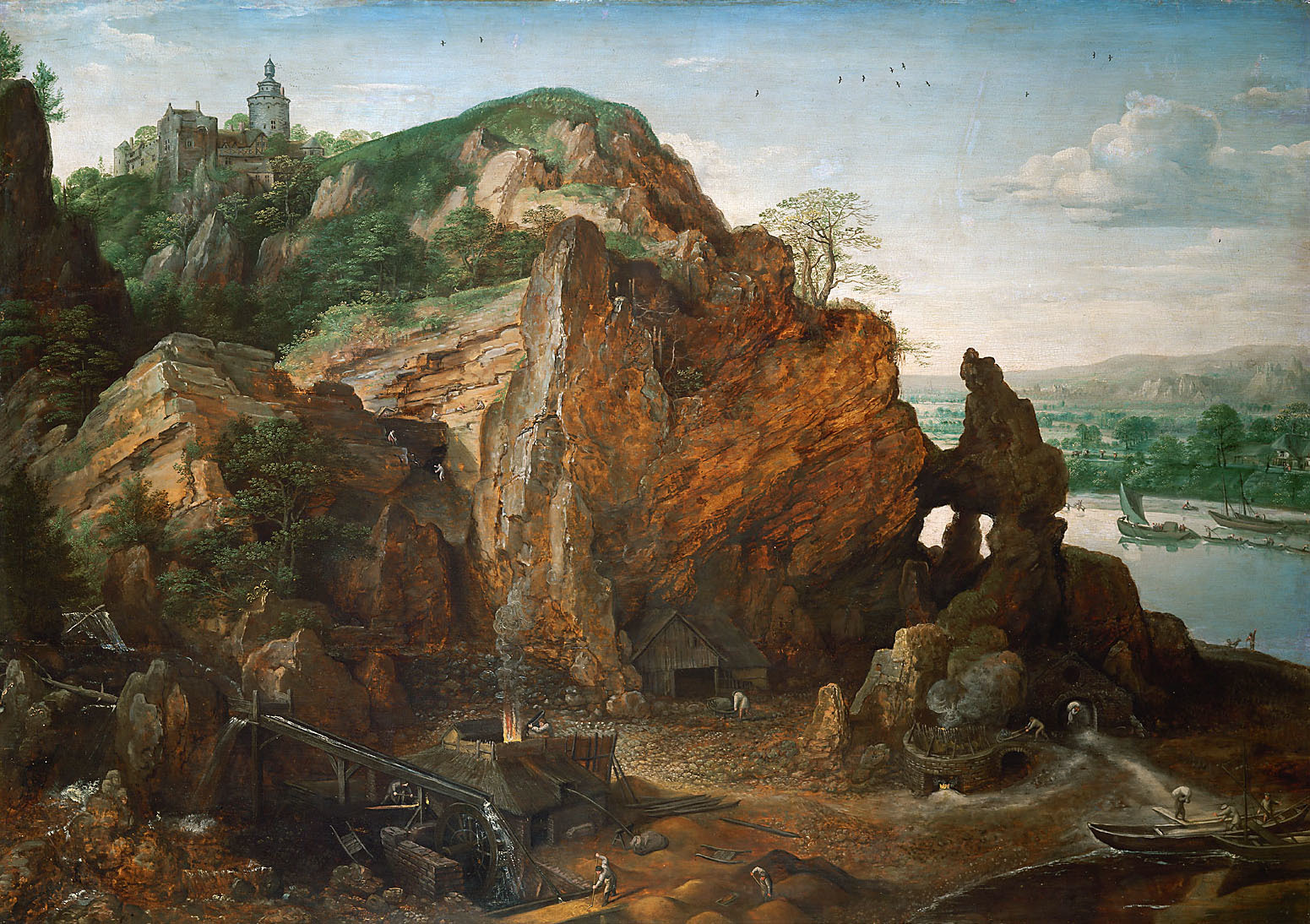
Landscape with Mine and Forge

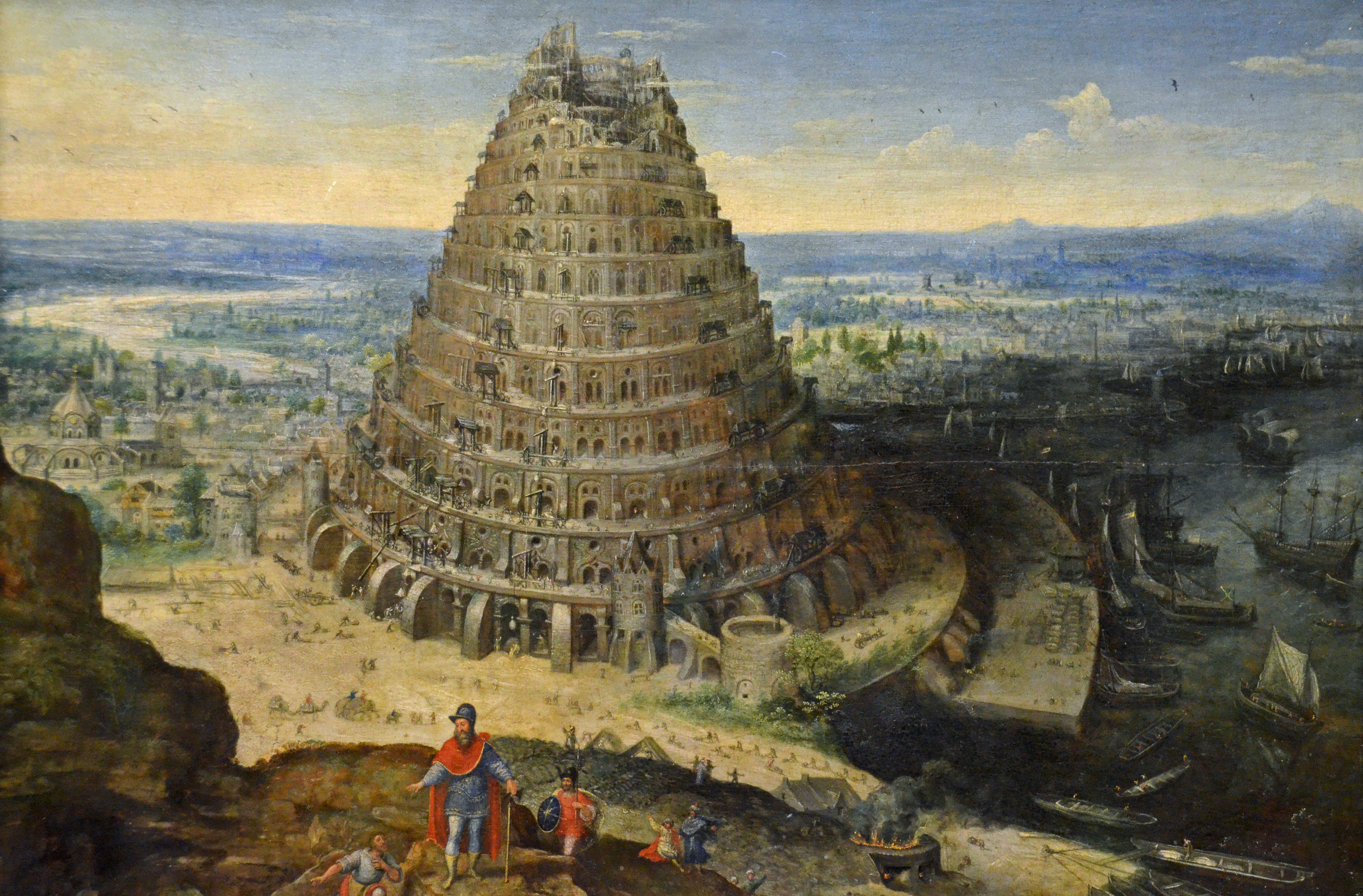
Tower of Babel
