= Francisco Agulló y Cebrian =

Spanish nobleman

Francisco Agulló y Cebrián

Alguacil Mayor of the Santa Inquisición of Xàtiva
- Monarch: Philip V

Personal details
- Born: 18th century Xàtiva, Valencia, Spain
- Died: 18th century Orihuela, province of Alicante, Spain
- Spouse: Josefa Manuela Sánchez de Bellmont y Cebrián
- Occupation: Politician

Military service
- Allegiance: Spain
- Branch/service: Spanish Army

Francisco Agulló y Cebrián (1720s-1780s) was a Spanish nobleman, who held the title of Knight of the Order of Montesa. He also held public offices serving as Alguacil Mayor and Regidor of San Felipe (Xàtiva, Valencia).

== Biography ==
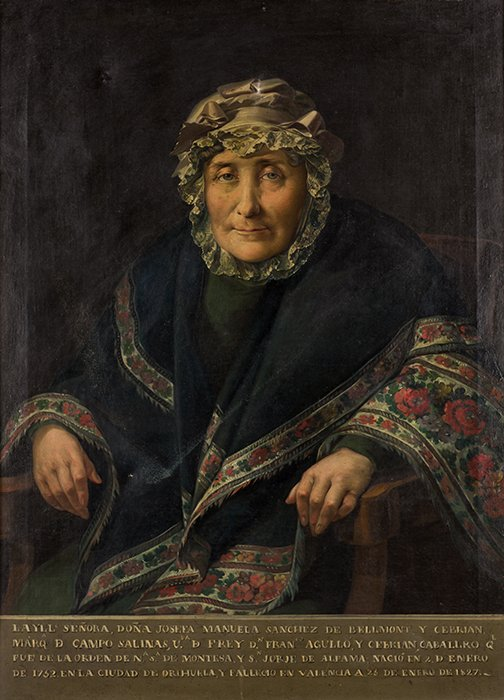
Josefa Manuela Sanchez de Bellmont y Cebrian, Marquesa de Campo Salinas, by circle of Vicente López Portaña

Agulló was born in Xàtiva, Province of Valencia, Spain, son of Jacinto José Agulló y Guitart and Ángeles Cebrián, belonging to distinguished Valencian families of Aragonese and Catalan roots. He was married to Josefa Manuela Sánchez de Bellmont y Cebrián, II Marquise de Campo Salinas, daughter of Ignacio Sánchez de Bellmont y Luisa Cebrián y Bordas. They were the parents of José Agulló Sánchez Bellmont.

Francisco Agulló y Cebrian held the position of alguacil mayor of the Santa Inquisición de San Felipe, and served as regidor between 1760 and 1795.
