= Portrait of a Young Englishman =

Painting by Titian

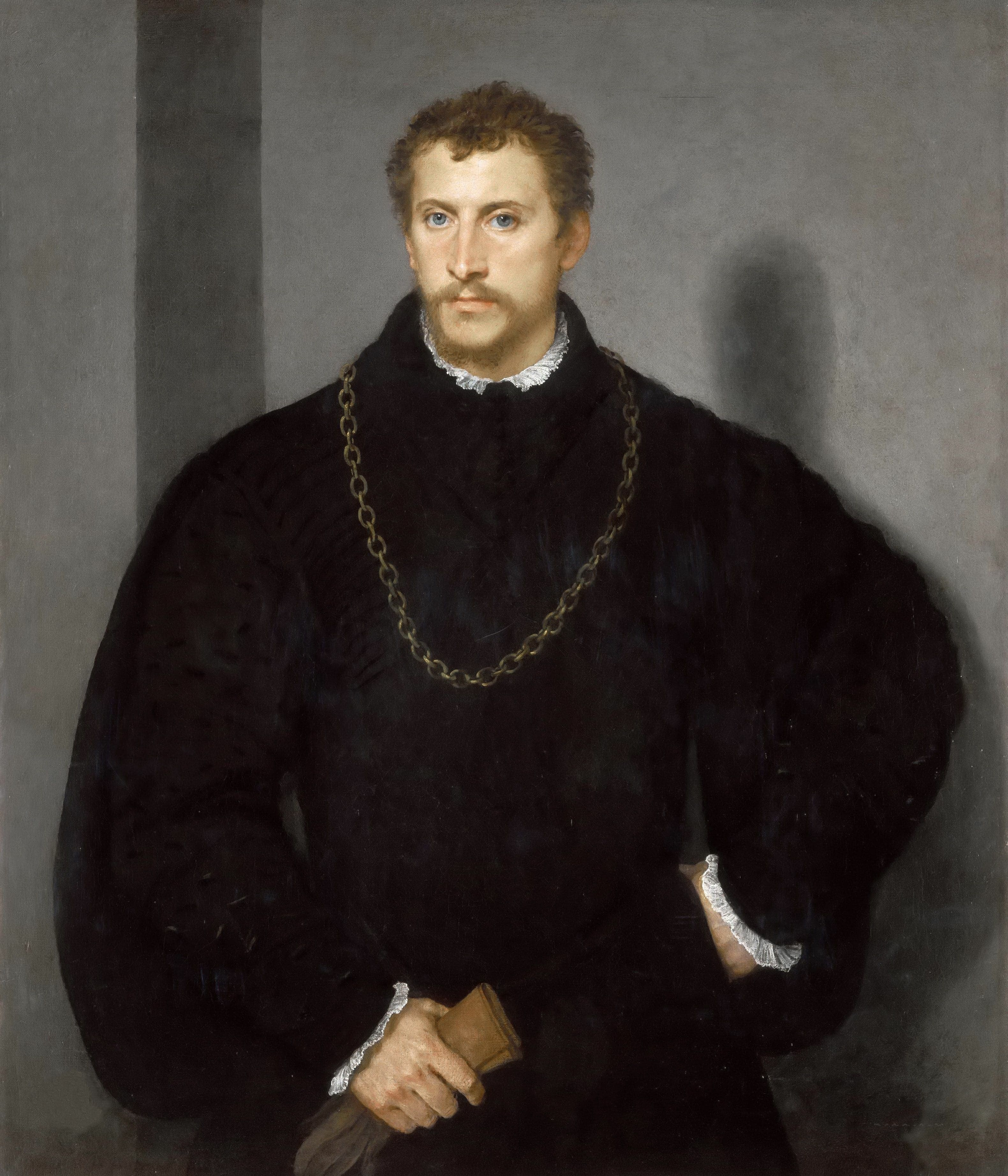
- Artist: Titian
- Year: 1540–1545
- Medium: oil on canvas
- Dimensions: 111 cm × 96.8 cm (44 in × 38.1 in)
- Location: Palazzo Pitti; Florence

Portrait of a Young Englishman (Portrait of a Young Man with Grey Eyes) is an oil on canvas portrait by Titian, from c. 1540-1545. It is held in the Palazzo Pitti, in Florence. Its the uncertain that the portrait is really of an Englishman, he remains unidentified, but it may be in fact Henry Howard, or the Italians Ottavio Farnese or Ippolito Riminaldi.

== Description ==
The young man appears delicately on the background made with intelligent brushstrokes just accentuated on the neck and cuffs of the white lace of the shirt. It is undeniably an exceptional portrait of the beginning of the artist's mature period. The sitter's transparent, shining eyes contribute to give the gaze a great psychological penetration. Titian exceptionally uses only few colours – mainly black, grey, white and pink. This makes the portrait more suggestive, and the figure stands out against the uniform grey background, casting only a delicate shadow. His face and penetrating eyes emphasize the man's spiritual state and his internal nervous tension.

The painting is recorded in the collections of the Grand Dukes of Florence, in 1698.

== Cultural references ==
The painting was included and described by the French historian Paul Veyne in his work Mon musée imaginaire (2010), dedicated to Italian painting.
