= Jean Mauger =

French sculptor

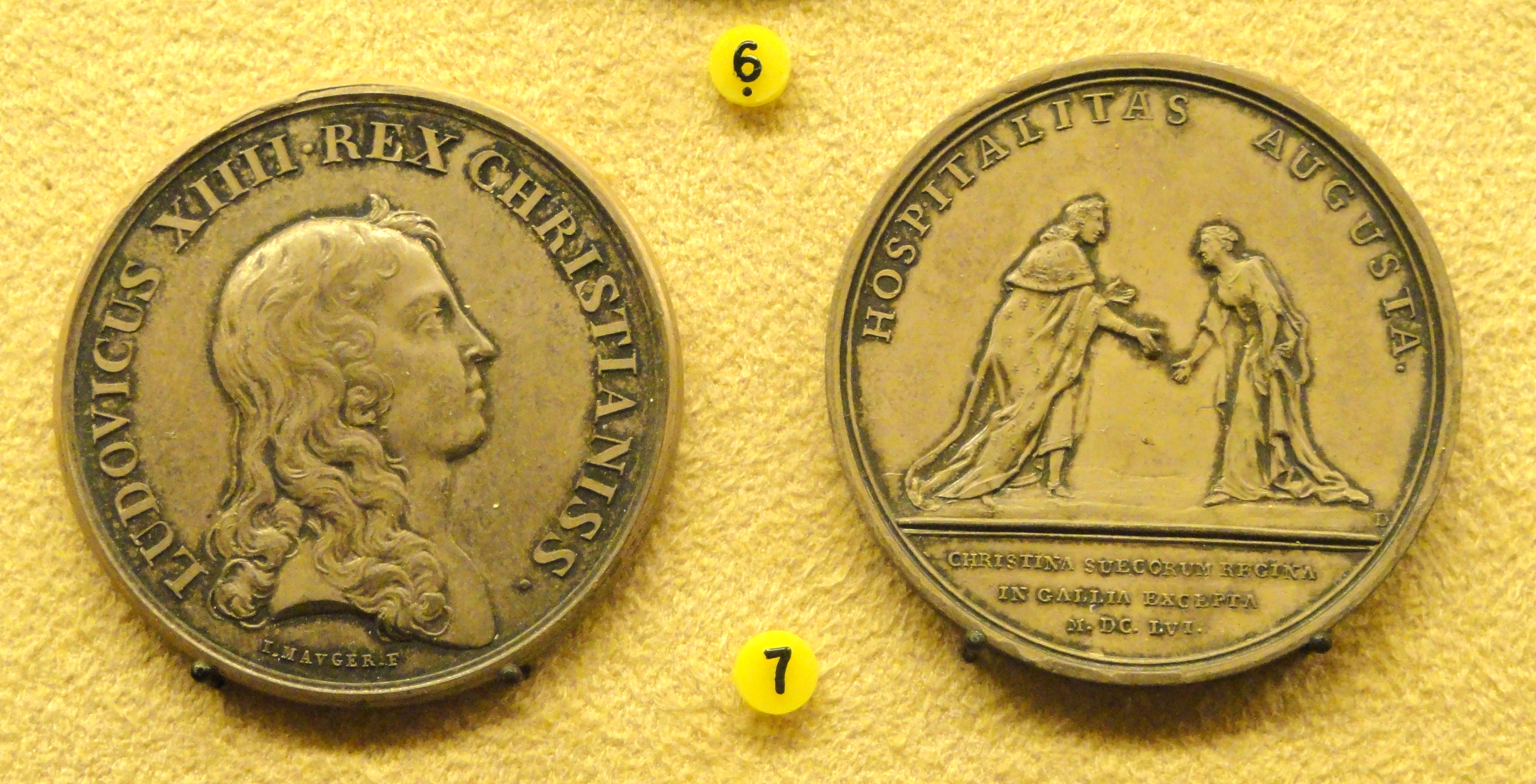
medallion commemorating the visit of Christina, Queen of Sweden to France by Jean Mauger, National Museum of Finland, 1656

Jean Mauger (1648 – 9 September 1712) was a French medallist.

Mauger was born in Dieppe. After training as an ivory engraver in his hometown, he relocated to Paris in 1677. He worked at the Paris mint from 1685 until his death. He was married to Elizabeth, daughter of the goldsmith John Clay, and had at least two children. The most prolific medallist of his generation, Mauger was responsible for 250 of the 286 medals reproduced in the medallic history of Louis XIV, published in 1702. Most of these works were based on his own original designs. Examples of Mauger's medals can be found at the British Museum and at the Bibliothèque nationale de France in the Cabinet des Médailles building. The Rijksmuseum also has a good collection, which can be viewed online.

He died in Paris.
