= Diego Vidal de Liendo =

Spanish painter

Diego Vidal de Liendo (1622–1648), "the Younger" of that name, was a Spanish painter of the Baroque. He was born at Valmaseda. He was also called Vidal the Younger. He was the nephew of Vidal the elder, and like him was both a painter and a canon of Seville Cathedral. He followed his uncle's example in studying in Rome. His paintings for the sacristy of Valencia Cathedral include life-size figures of various Saints, and a copy of Raphael's St. Michael triumphing over Satan. Vidal died at Seville.
