= Gabriel de la Corte =

Spanish painter

- Born: 1648; Madrid, Spain
- Died: 6 August 1694; Madrid, Spain
- Known for: Flower still lifes, garlands and decorative floral compositions
- Movement: Baroque

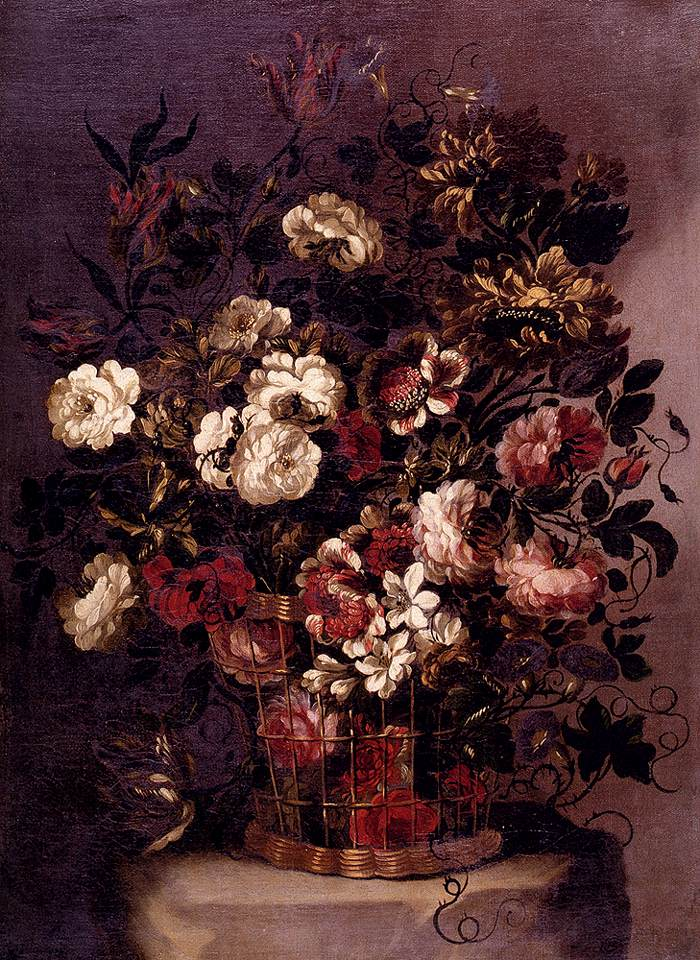
Still-Life of Flowers in a Woven Basket by Gabriel de la Corte, private collection

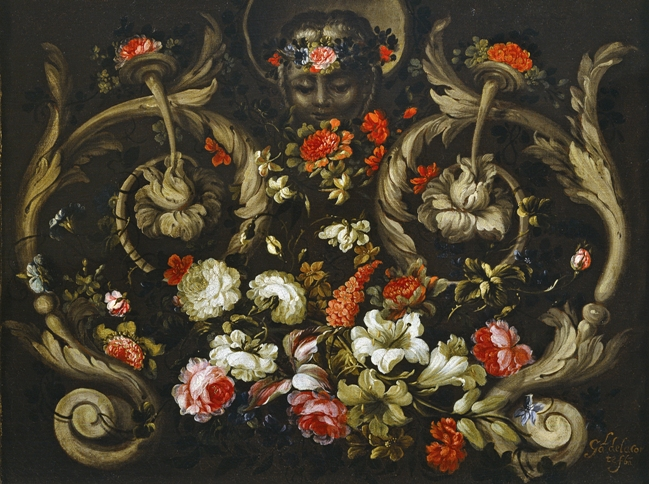
Grotesques with Flowers (Roses and Tulips), Museo Nacional del Prado

Gabriel de la Corte (1648 – 6 August 1694) was a Spanish painter specializing in the painting of vases, baskets, garlands and signboards, that he had learned to paint without help of any teacher. Although he was a prolific artist he had little success and lived in poverty. In this context Gabriel was selling his works "on account of the necessity", at a very low price, and some of the Madrid painters of that time charged him with the job of helping them in their minor works.

His compositions are often ornate, and he painted with a confident touch.

== Works ==
- Stil-Life of Flowers in a Woven Basket, private collection
- Two paintings of the Vase of Flowers
- Flowers in a Basket (1680s)
- Two paintings of Grotesques with Flowers (1690), Museo del Prado
