= Portrait of Lavinia Vecellio =

Painting by Titian

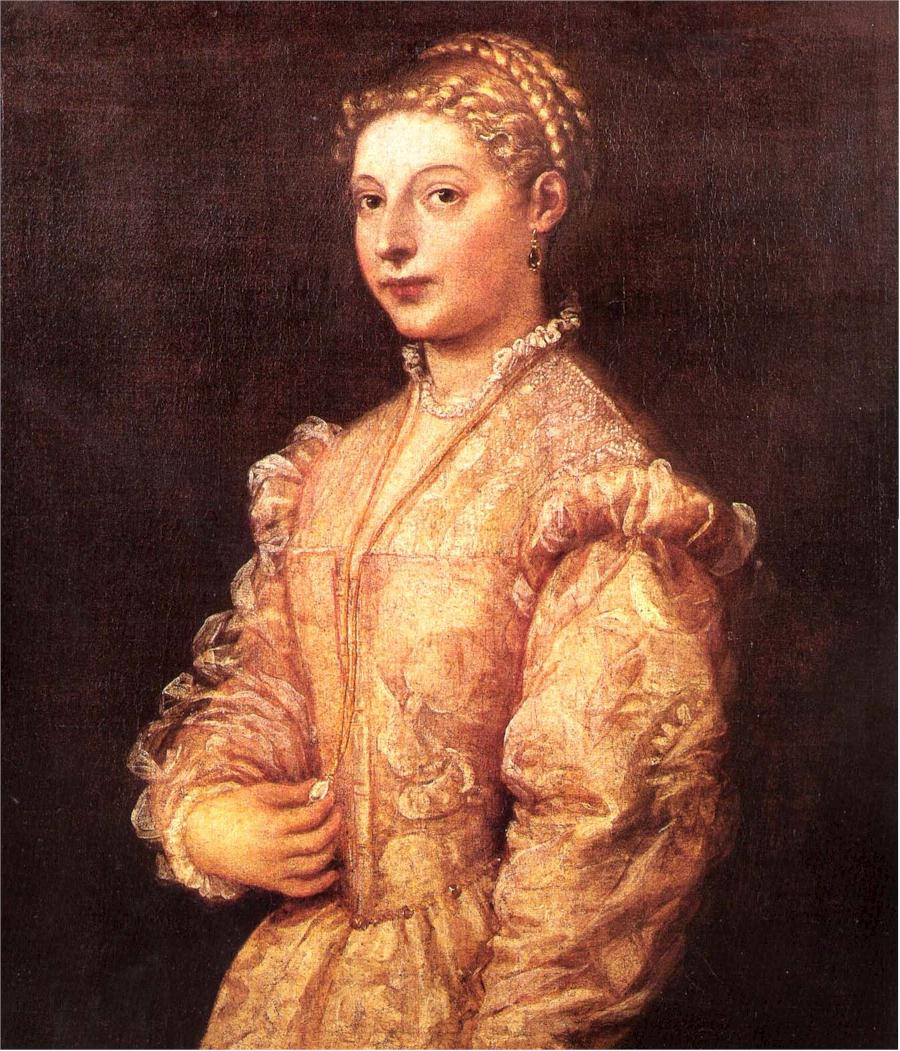
- Artist: Titian
- Year: c. 1545
- Medium: Oil on wood
- Dimensions: 84.5 cm × 73 cm (33.3 in × 29 in)
- Location: Museo di Capodimonte, Naples

Portrait of Lavinia Vecellio is an oil on wood portrait by Titian, from c. 1545. It is believed to depict his daughter Lavinia. It is held in the Museo di Capodimonte, in Naples.

== History ==
The painting is datable to 1545-1546, when Titian was in Rome at the service of the Farnese family. It is mentioned for the first time in the mid-17th century when it was at the Palazzo Farnese, in Rome, as a "beautiful portrait of a young Venetian lady, by the hand of Titian".

Subsequently, the canvas appears among the 103 works that in 1662 were transferred from the papal capital to Parma, first to the Palazzo del Giardino (1680) and then relocated together with approximately 300 canvases in the Gallery of the Palazzo della Pilotta. The work appears, together with the Portrait of Paul III, in the Description of the one hundred masterpieces of the museum of 1725, until it was merged with a large part of the Farnese collection into the inheritance of Charles III of Spain, who took it to Naples, in 1734. It appears in the catalogues of the Museo di Capodimonte, until 1799, when during the Joachim Murat rule it was moved together with other canvases to the Palazzo dei Regi Studi (now the National Archaeological Museum).

During the Second World War the portrait had the same fate as the Danae by Titian (also in Capodimonte), that is, it was among the works stolen by the Nazi troops who took it from the deposits of the Abbey of Montecassino, where they were kept in safety. In 1947 the painting was then found in the Altaussée quarry in Austria and returned to the Italian State.

In 1960 the canvas underwent major work which restored the original chromatic material.

== Identity of the subject ==
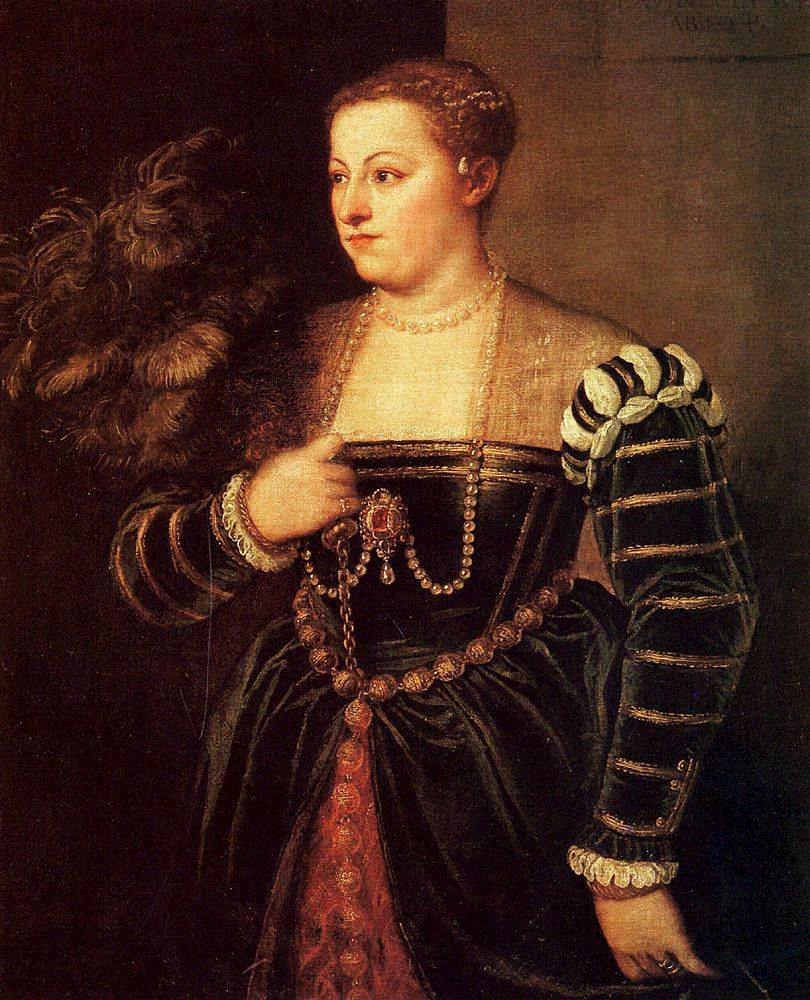
A 1560-1565 portrait by Titian, sometimes also identified as Lavinia (Gemäldegalerie Alte Meister, Dresden).

Particularly appreciated by writers and historians of the past, such as Tommaso Puccini, the current painting has been the subject of controversy regarding the identification of the woman portrayed.

According to some critics, the woman can be identified as Titian's daughter, Lavinia Vecellio, based on an alleged portrait of her (Portrait of a Lady in a White Dress, dated around 1561) now at the Gemäldegalerie Alte Meister, in Dresden. Other hypotheses suggest that it depicts a woman from the Roman court of the Farnese family, or the daughter of Cardinal Alessandro the Younger, Clelia, while according to yet another theory, partially supported by archive documents, specifically by a letter from 1544 sent by the papal nuncio in Venice, Giovanni Della Casa, to Alessandro Farnese, the woman would be a certain Angela, a courtesan and lover of the cardinal himself, as well as the inspiring muse for Titian for the figure of Danae, also at the Museo di Capodimonte.

== Description ==
The woman seems to be of high social status, judging by her rich clothing and jewelry. He has blonde hair, is depicted with a serene facial expression, at half-length turned three-quarters. She wears an aristocratic dress adorned with embroidery and trim "with sleeves and shoulders in white", while in her right hand she holds a pearl tied around her neck by a gold thread.
