= José Agulló Sánchez Bellmont =

Spanish nobleman (1774–1824)

José María Agulló y Sánchez Bellmont

Baron de Tamarit Caballero Maestrante de la Real de Valencia Conde de Ripalda Marqués de Campo Salinas
- Monarchs: Charles IV; Ferdinand VII

Personal details
- Born: 1774 Xativa, Valencia, Spain
- Died: 1824 (aged 49–50) Xativa, Valencia, Spain
- Spouse: Vicenta de Ramón de Sentís y Ripalda
- Occupation: Politician

Military service
- Allegiance: Spain
- Branch/service: Spanish Army
- Rank: Caballero Maestrante
- Unit: Real Maestranza de Caballería de Valencia
- Battles/wars: Peninsular War

José María Agulló Sánchez Bellmont (1774–1824) was a Spanish nobleman, who held the titles nobiliary of Marquess of Campo-Salinas, Baron of Tamarit, Count of Ripalda and Knight of the Royal Cavalry Armory of Valencia.

== Biography ==
Born in Xativa, Valencia, José María Agulló Sánchez Bellmont was the son of Francisco Agulló y Cebrian and Josefa Sánchez de Bellmont, II Marquise de Campo Salinas, belonging to noble and distinguished families of the Iberian Peninsula. He was married to Vicenta Ramón de Sentís, born in 1784 in Valencia, daughter of José Vicente Ramón de Sentís y Cascajares, I Barón de Tamarit, and Ramona Ripalda y Vidarte, born in Pamplona.

José Agulló y Sánchez Bellmont held various public positions, including as Commissioner of Agriculture régio in the province of Valencia and Castellon. His son José Joaquin Agulló y Ramon was the VI Conde de Ripalda.
