= Richard Tassel =

French painter

Richard Tassel (1582–1660) was a French painter.

Tassel was born and worked in Langres, Champagne, France. His father Pierre was also a painter and is thought to have trained him. Tassel painted primarily religious themed works. He died in Langres in 1660.
