= Laurence Hilliard =

English painter (1582–1648)

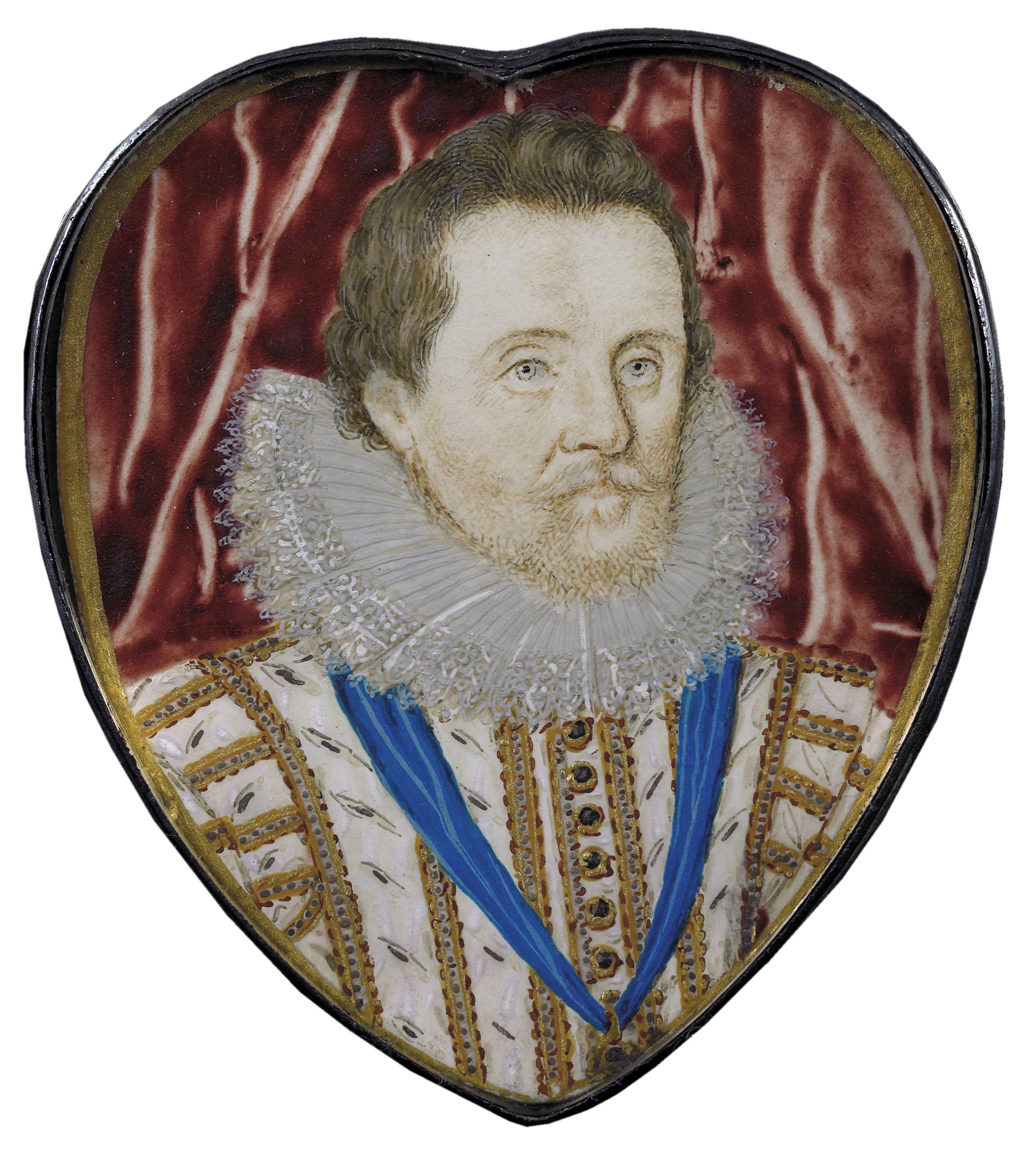
Miniature portrait of James I, attributed to Laurence Hilliard

Laurence Hilliard (1582–1648) was an English miniature painter.

== Early life ==
Hilliard, a son of Nicholas Hilliard (1547–1619) and his wife Alice Brandon (1556–1611) – was christened on 5 March 1582. He evidently derived his Christian name from that of his grandmother, Laurence Wall, the daughter of John Wall, a London goldsmith.

== Career ==
Hilliard adopted his father's profession and worked out the unexpired time of his licence after Nicholas Hilliard died in 1619. It was from Lawrence Hilliard that Charles I received the portrait of Queen Elizabeth now at The British Museum, since Van der Dort's catalogue describes it as done by old Hilliard, and bought by the King from young Hilliard.

In 1624 he was paid £42 from the treasury for five pictures, but the warrant does not specify whom they represented. His portraits are rare, two of the most beautiful being those in the collections of Earl Beauchamp and Mr J Pierpont Morgan. They are as a rule signed L.H., but are also to be distinguished by the beauty of the calligraphy in which the inscriptions round the portraits are written. The writing is as a rule very florid, full of exquisite curves and flourishes, and more elaborate than the more formal handwriting of Nicholas Hilliard.

== Personal life ==
He was married on 4 December 1611 to Jane (Cullymore) Farmer of St Mary-le-Bow, Cheapside – the widow of George Farmer and daughter of George Cullymore and Ellen Buckfoulde – at the church of St Saviour's, Southwark. They settled in at the parish of St Bride Fleet Street, London.

== Death ==
His will, dated 21 February 1641 and "seven years almost to the day", he was buried in the same parish of St Bride's Church on 23 February 1648. He was survived by his four children: Brandon, Thomas, Charles, and his daughter Laurence who used to refer to herself as Laurentia Hilliard.
