= Francisco Agullo =

Spanish painter

Francisco Agullo (died 1648) was a Spanish painter. He was born in Concentaina, and in 1637, he painted an altar-piece for the convent of San Sebastian.
