= Francesco da Urbino =

Italian painter

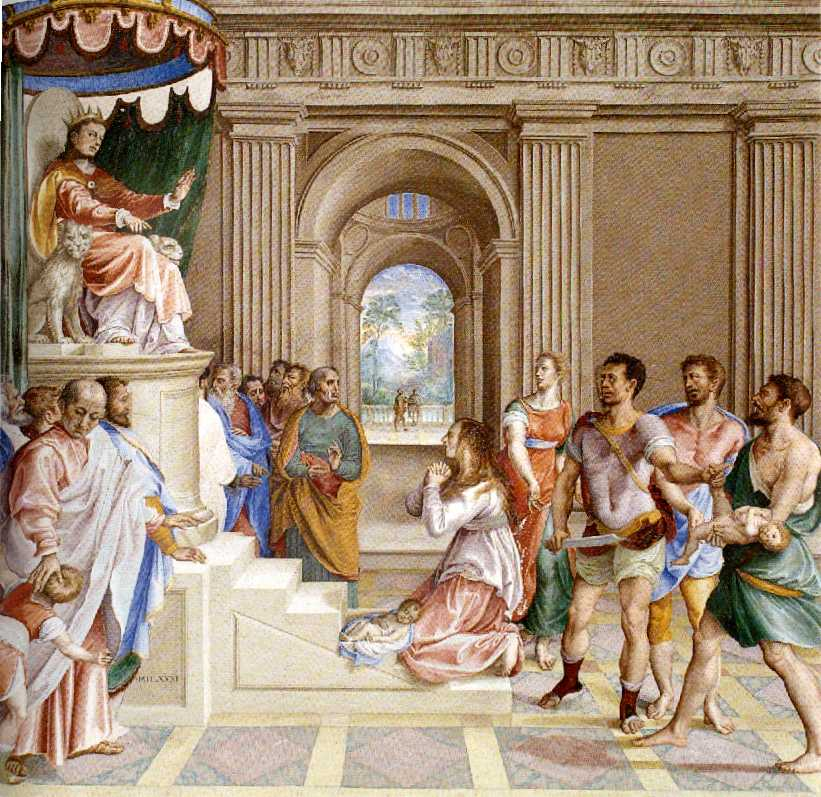
Francesco da Urbino, The Judgement of Solomon, 1581

Francesco da Urbino (1545–1582) was an Italian painter and artist.

Francesco was born in Urbino. He specialized in religious themed paintings. He died in 1582. One of his works can be found at the Art Institute of Chicago.
