= 1655 in art =

Events from the year 1655 in art.

== Paintings ==
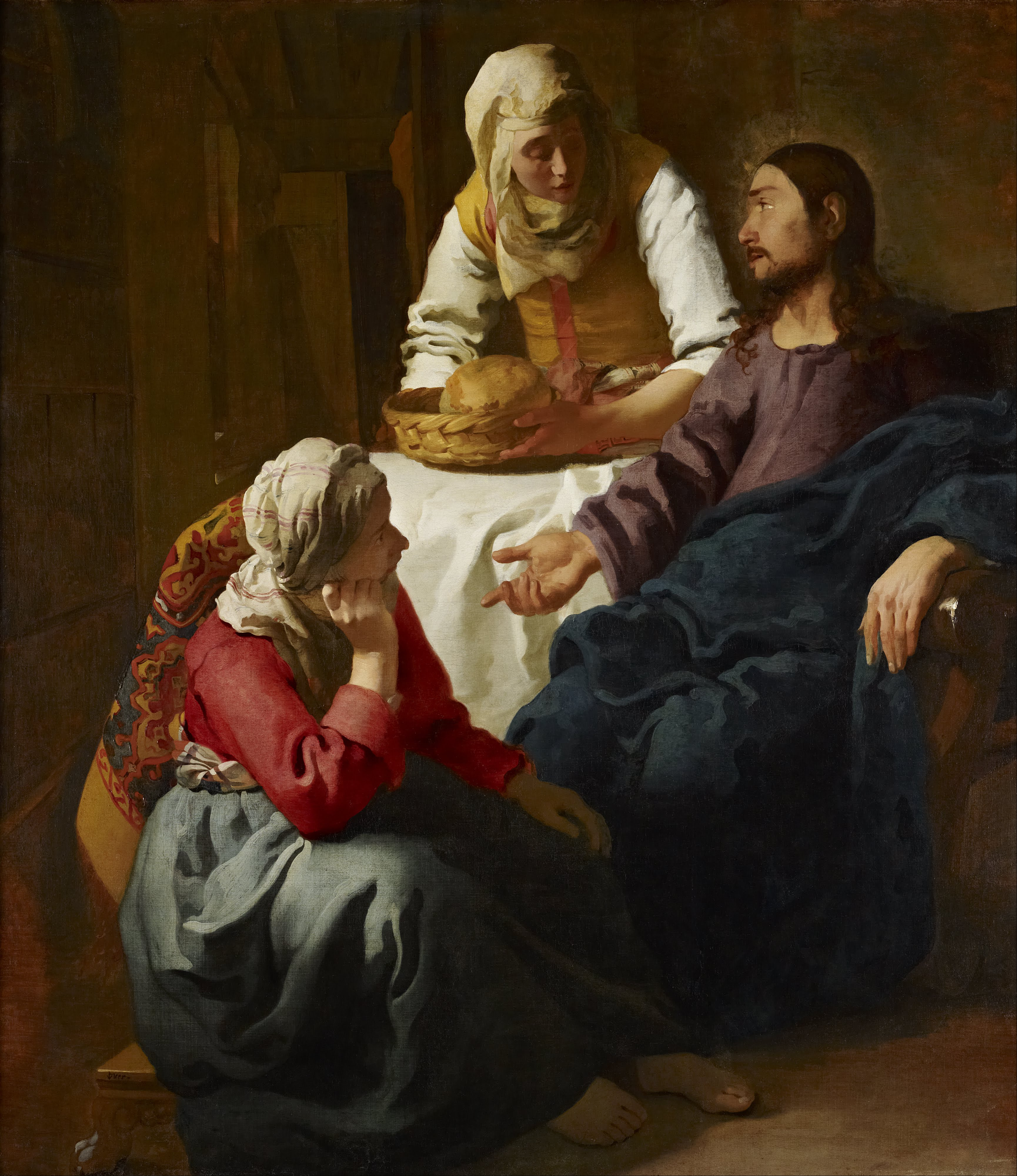
Christ in the House of Martha and Mary (Vermeer)

- Nicolaes Maes
  - Eavesdropper with a Scolding Woman
  - The Idle Servant (National Gallery, London)
  - The Lacemaker (National Gallery of Canada, Ottawa)
  - A Woman Spinning (Rijksmuseum, Amsterdam)
  - A Young Woman Sewing (Guildhall Art Gallery, City of London)
- Nicolas Poussin - St. Peter Healing a Sick Man
- Rembrandt
  - (attributed) - The Polish Rider
  - Christ Presented to the People (Ecce Homo) (drypoint)
- Bartholomeus van der Helst - Self-portrait
- Diego Velázquez - Infanta Maria Margareta
- Vermeer - Christ in the House of Martha and Mary

== Births ==
- January 21 - Antonio Molinari, Venetian painter of mythology and religious figures (died 1704)
- February 25 - Carel de Moor, Dutch etcher and painter (died 1738)
- March 4 - Fra Galgario (Giuseppe Ghislandi), Bergamese painter, mainly of portraits during the Rococo epoch (died 1743)
- June 11 - Antonio Cifrondi, Italian painter of genre works (died 1730)
- November 16 - Alessandro Gherardini, Italian painter, active mainly in Florence (died 1723)
- date unknown
  - Marie Courtois, French miniature painter (died 1703)
  - Englebert Fisen, Flemish painter (died 1733)
  - Johann Ulrich Kraus, German illustrator, engraver and publisher (died 1719)
  - Antonio Lorenzini, Italian painter and engraver (died 1740)
  - Giacomo Pavia, Italian painter, active mainly in his native Bologna (died 1740)
  - Jacques Prou, French Academic sculptor (died 1706)
  - Anthoni Schoonjans, Belgian painter (died 1726)
  - Sébastien Slodtz, French sculptor (died 1726)
  - Filippo Tancredi, Italian painter of church frescoes (died 1722)
  - David von Krafft, German-Swedish painter, nephew of David Klöcker Ehrenstrahl and his successor at the Swedish Royal Court (died 1725)

== Deaths ==
- April 30 - Eustache Le Sueur or Lesueur, French painter (born 1617)
- date unknown
  - Hendrick Andriessen, Flemish still-life painter (born 1607)
  - Abraham de Vries, Dutch painter (born 1590)
  - Giovanni Andrea Donducci (Mastelletta), Italian painter of the Bolognese School (painting) (born 1575)
  - Giovanni Francesco Guerrieri, Italian painter and Caravaggisti (born 1589)
  - Giovanni Battista Michelini, Italian painter of religious and mythological subjects (born 1604)
  - Claes Corneliszoon Moeyaert, Catholic Dutch painter (born 1592)
  - Abraham van den Hecken, Dutch painter of genre pieces, religious and historical scenes, portraits and still lifes (born 1615)
  - Floris van Schooten, Dutch painter (born 1590)
  - Herman van Swanevelt, Dutch painter (born 1604)
  - Yi Sam-pyeong, father of Imari porcelain
