= 1740 in art =

Events from the year 1740 in art.

== Events ==
- October 13 – Jacques Saly arrives in Rome to study at the French Academy there.
- Susanna Drury exhibits gouache paintings of the Giant's Causeway in Ireland.

== Works ==
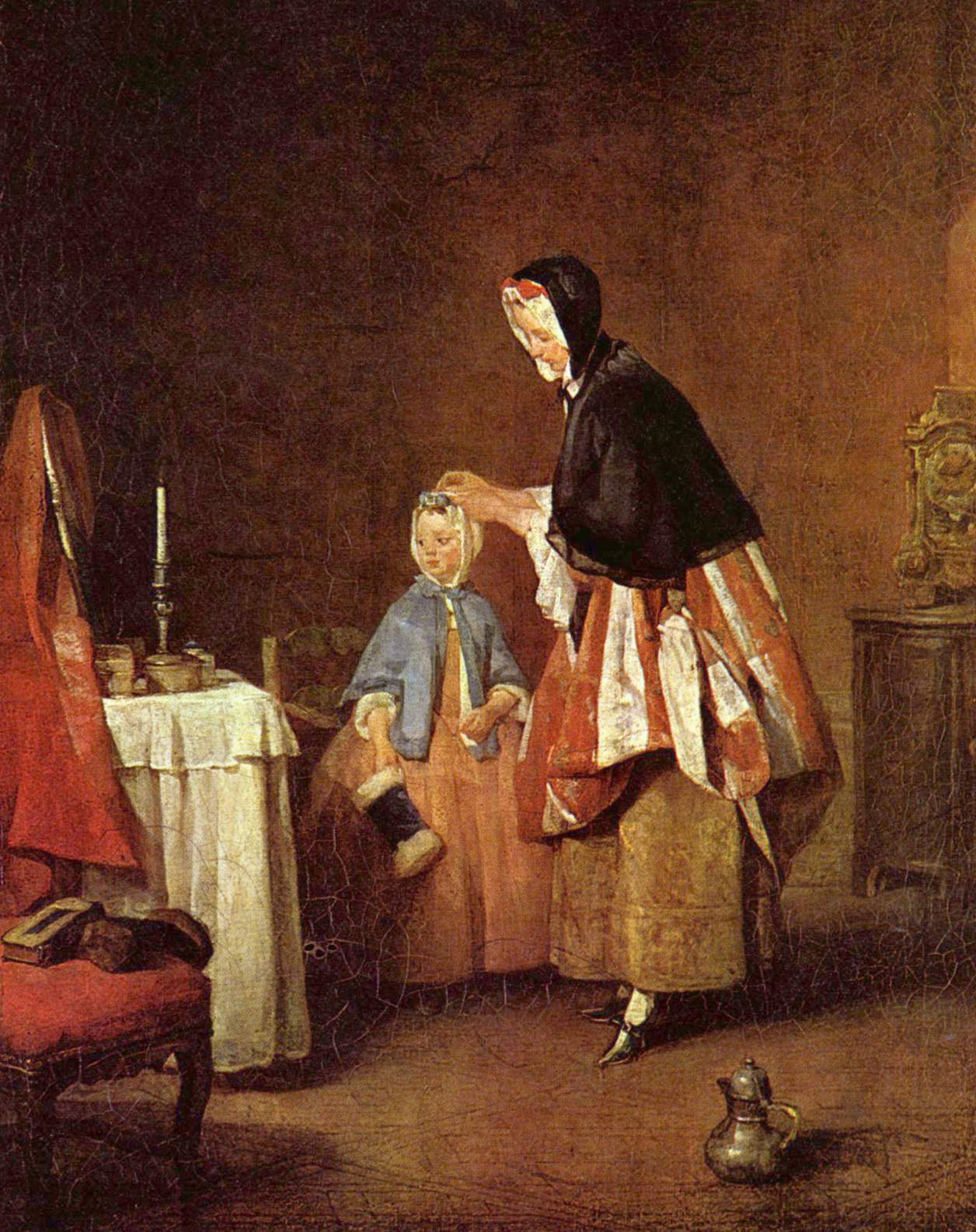
Chardin, The Morning Toilette

- Canaletto
  - The Grand Canal with San Simeone Piccolo
  - A Regatta on the Grand Canal (National Gallery, London)
  - Venice: The Basin of San Marco on Ascension Day (National Gallery, London)
  - Venice: The Campo SS. Giovanni e Paolo (British Royal Collection, Windsor Castle)
  - Venice: Santa Maria della Salute (Metropolitan Museum of Art, New York)
- Jean-Baptiste-Siméon Chardin – The Morning Toilette
- Matthäus Günther – Fresco in church of SS. Peter and Paul, Mittenwald, Bavaria
- William Hogarth – Portrait of Captain Thomas Coram
- James Latham – The Rt Hon. Sir Capel Molyneux
- Michele Marieschi – The Grand Canal at the Palazzo Foscari
- Philippe Mercier – Portrait of John Hall-Stevenson
- Peter Scheemakers – Monument to William Shakespeare in Westminster Abbey (designed by William Kent)
- Samuel Scott – The Capture of Puerto Bello
- Giovanni Battista Tiepolo – Alexander the Great and Campaspe in the Studio of Apelles

== Births ==
- February 16 – Giambattista Bodoni, Italian typographer, type-designer, compositor, printer and publisher (died 1813)
- March 2 – Nicholas Pocock, English marine painter (died 1821)
- May 28 – Fedot Shubin, Russian sculptor (died 1805)
- September 7 – Johan Tobias Sergel, Swedish sculptor (died 1814)
- September 17 – John Hamilton Mortimer, British Neoclassical painter known primarily for his romantic paintings and Italian landscapes (died 1779)
- October 31 – Philip James de Loutherbourg, English miniaturist (died 1812)
- November 24 – John Bacon, British sculptor (died 1799)
- date unknown
  - Innocente Alessandri, Italian engraver, born in Venice (died unknown)
  - Margaret Bingham, British painter and writer (died 1814)
  - William Beilby, British glassworker and enameller (died 1819)
  - Claude André Deseine, French sculptor (died 1823)
  - Edmund Garvey, Irish painter (died 1813)
  - Charles-Étienne Gaucher, French engraver (died 1804)
  - Nathaniel Grogan Irish painter from Cork (died 1807)
  - William Marlow, English marine painter (died 1813)
  - Nikola Nešković, Serbian religious painter of icons, frescoes, and portraits (died 1789)
  - Mariano Ramon Sanchez, Spanish painter primarily of portrait miniatures (died 1822)
- probable
  - John Smart, English painter of portrait miniatures (died 1811)
  - Hugh Douglas Hamilton, Irish portrait artist (died 1808)
  - Vincenzio Vangelisti, Italian engraver (died 1798)
  - Antoine Vestier, French miniaturist and painter of portraits (died 1824)

== Deaths ==
- January 30 – Amalia Königsmarck, Swedish painter (born 1663)
- February 23 – Massimiliano Soldani Benzi, Italian sculptor and medallist (born 1656)
- April 21 – Antonio Balestra, Italian Rococo painter (born 1666)
- May 18 – Giuseppe Palmieri, Italian painter (born 1674)
- June – Jan Frans van Bloemen, Flemish landscape painter (born 1662)
- July 16 – Jan Kupecký, Czech and Slovak portrait painter (born 1667)
- July 20 – Giuseppe Antonio Caccioli, Italian painter (born 1672)
- July 21 – Johann Evangelist Holzer, Austrian-German painter (born 1709)
- September 2 – Pietro Bianchi, Italian painter, active in Genoa and Rome (born 1694)
- November 22 – Georg Gsell, Swiss painter (born 1673)
- December 24 – Bernard Lens III, English artist known primarily for his portrait miniatures (born 1682)
- date unknown
  - Francesco Costa, Italian painter of ornaments and quadratura (born 1672)
  - Franz de Paula Ferg, Austrian landscape painter (born 1689)
  - Francesco Fernandi, Italian painter (born 1679)
  - Jean Joly, French sculptor (born 1650)
  - Antonio Lorenzini, Italian painter and engraver (born 1655)
  - Grigoriis Musikiysky, Russian painter (born 1670)
  - Giacomo Pavia, Italian painter, active mainly in his native Bologna (born 1655)
  - Giovanni Felice Ramelli, Italian miniaturist (born 1666)
  - Arcangelo Resani, Italian painter of animals and hunted game (born 1670)
  - Giuseppe Rivola, Italian painter (born unknown)
  - Jacob van Huysum, Dutch botanical artist (born 1687)
- probable – Guglielmo da Leoni, Italian painter and engraver (born 1664)
