= 1666 in art =

Events from the year 1666 in art.

== Events ==
- June 1–4 – Four Days' Battle, a naval battle of the Second Anglo-Dutch War at which Willem van de Velde the Elder is present and makes sketches.
- A stay of three to five years at the Palazzo Mancini in Rome, at the expense of the King of France, is added to the Prix de Rome award.

== Works ==
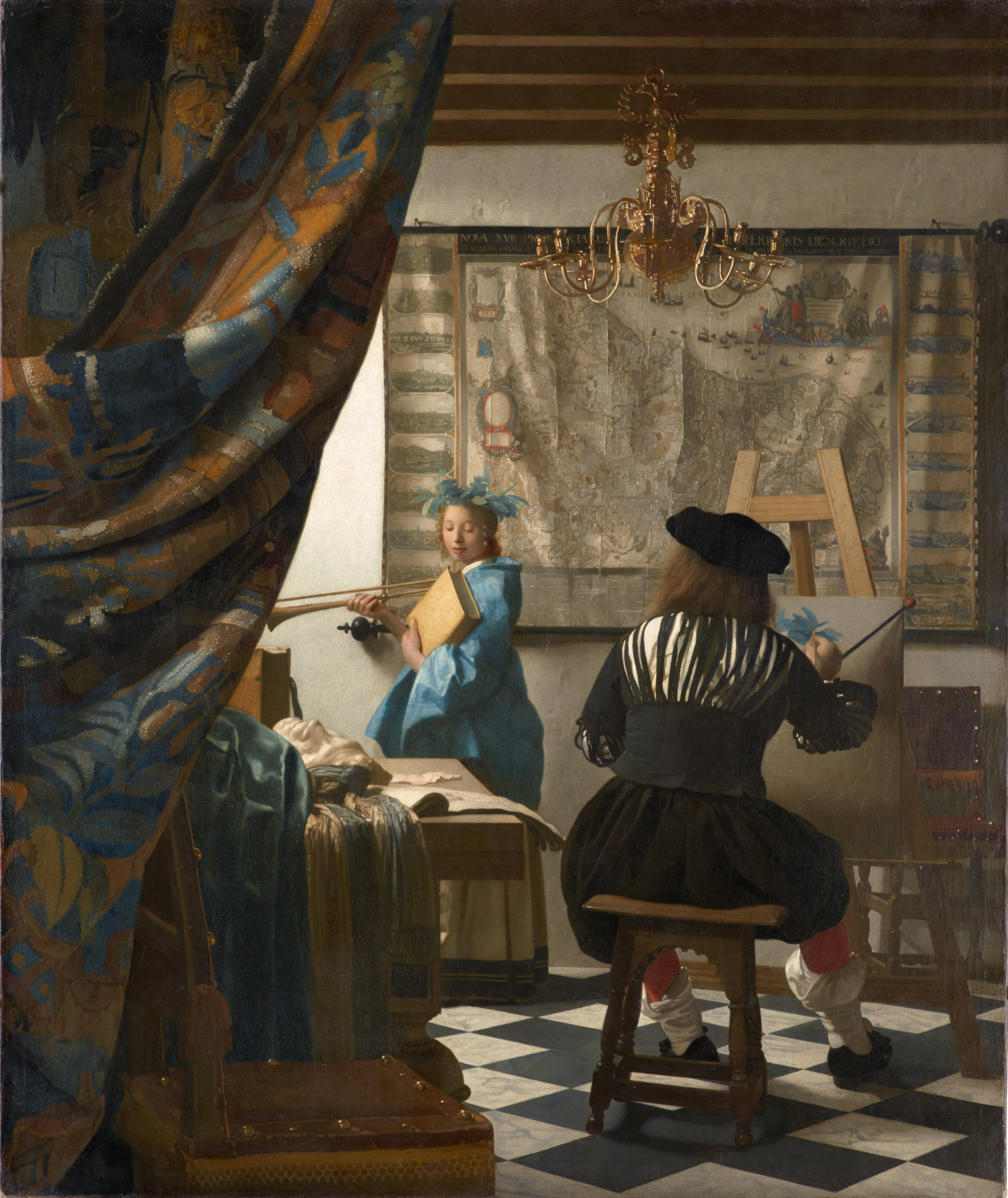
The Art of Painting (Vermeer)

- John Hayls – Portrait of Samuel Pepys
- Sir Peter Lely
  - Barbara Palmer, Duchess of Cleveland, as St. Catherine of Alexandria (approximate date)
  - Flagmen of Lowestoft, portraits of English admirals (series completed at about this date)
- Vermeer – The Art of Painting

== Births ==
- April 12 – Pierre Le Gros the Younger, French sculptor, active almost exclusively in Baroque Rome (died 1719)
- April 17 – Johann Michael Feuchtmayer the Elder, German painter and copper engraver (died 1713)
- August 12 – Antonio Balestra, Italian Rococo painter (died 1740)
- September 4 – Anna Maria Ehrenstrahl, Swedish Baroque painter of allegories, portraits and group portraits (died 1729)
- November 17 – Benedetto Luti, Italian painter of pastel portraits (died 1724)
- November 28 – Magnus Berg, Norwegian painter, woodcarver, sculptor and non-fiction writer (died 1739)
- date unknown
  - Ferdinando del Cairo, Italian painter (died 1748)
  - Giovanna Fratellini, Italian painter of small miniature portraits (died 1731)
  - Giovanni Felice Ramelli, Italian painter of portrait miniatures and abbot (died 1740)

== Deaths ==
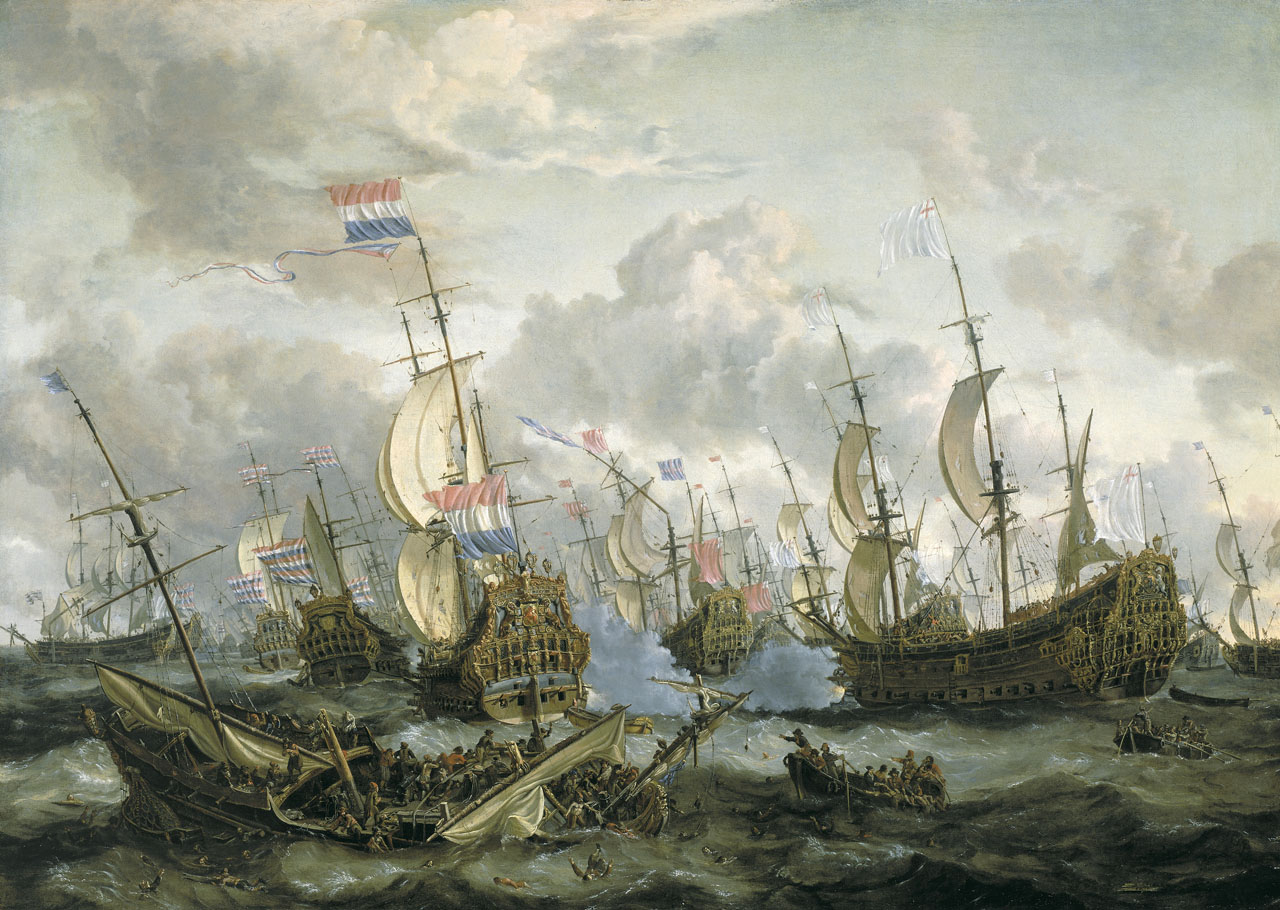
The Four Days' Battle, 1–4 June 1666 (Abraham Storck)

- February 24 – Nicholas Lanier, English composer, singer, lutenist, painter and art collector (born 1588)
- May 13 – Pier Francesco Mola, Italian painter of frescoes (born 1612)
- June 29 – Mateo Cerezo, Spanish painter (born 1637)
- August 26 – Frans Hals, Dutch painter (born c. 1580)
- October – Jan Albertsz Rotius, Dutch portrait painter (born 1624)
- December 8 – Dancker Danckerts, Dutch engraver and publisher (born 1634)
- December 9 – Guercino, Italian Baroque painter (born 1591)
- date unknown
  - Domenico Bruni, Italian painter, mainly active in Brescia (born 1600)
  - Giovanni Angelo Canini, Italian painter and engraver (born 1609)
  - Philip Fruytiers, Flemish painter (born 1627)
  - Sebastian Furck, German engraver (born 1589)
- 1666 or 1667 – Peter Snayers, Flemish battlefield painter (born 1592)
