= 1706 in art =

Events from the year 1706 in art.

== Events ==
- Engraver Sébastien Leclerc is granted the title of cavaliere Romano by the Pope.

== Works ==
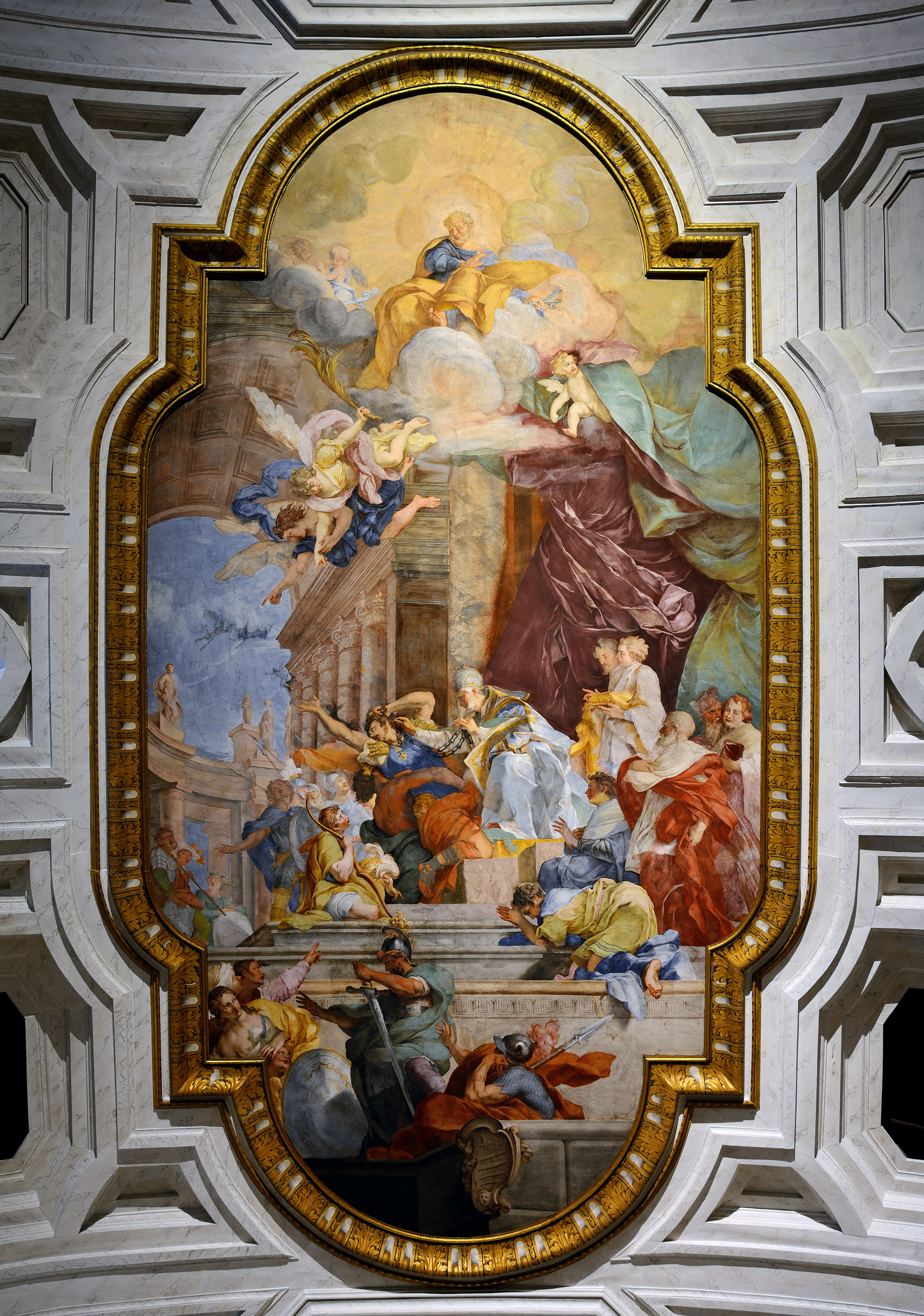
Parodi – The Miracle of the Chains of Peter, ceiling fresco in San Pietro in Vincoli, Rome

- Jan Brokoff – Statue of St Joseph (on the Charles Bridge in Prague; later replaced)
- Giovanni Battista Parodi – The Miracle of the Chains of Peter (ceiling fresco in San Pietro in Vincoli, Rome)

== Births ==
- January 3 – Johann Caspar Füssli, portrait painter (died 1782)
- January 17 – George Michael Moser, Swiss-born enameller (died 1783)
- February 12 – Johann Joseph Christian, German Baroque sculptor and woodcarver (died 1777)
- February 26 – Jan Antonín Vocásek, Czech Baroque still-life painter (died 1757)
- March 4 – Lauritz de Thurah, Danish architect (died 1759)
- March 12 – Johan Pasch, Swedish painter (died 1769)
- March 23 – Anna Maria Barbara Abesch, Swiss reverse glass painter (died 1773)
- April 1 – Christian Friedrich Boetius, German engraver (died 1782)
- April 30 – Philipp Jakob Straub, Austrian sculptor (died 1774)
- June 15 – Johann Joachim Kändler, German modeller of Meissen porcelain in a rococo style (died 1775)
- September 8 – Antoine de Favray, French portrait painter (died 1798)
- date unknown
  - Sabina Auffenwerth, German potter (died 1782)
  - Johan Backman, Finnish painter (died 1768)
  - George Bickham the Younger, English etcher, engraver, printseller, and one of the first English caricaturists (died 1771)
  - Simon François Ravenet, French engraver (died 1774)
  - Pieter Tanjé, engraver from the Northern Netherlands (died 1761)
  - Miguel Verdiguier, French sculptor (died 1796)

== Deaths ==
- January 10 – Luisa Roldán, Spanish sculptor (born 1652)
- May 17 – Jean-Pierre Rivalz, French painter (born 1625)
- July 3 – Thomas Regnaudin, French sculptor (born 1622)
- August 10 – Lorenzo Vaccaro, Italian sculptor (born 1655)
- August 26 – Michael Willmann, German painter (born 1630)
- September 26 – Onofrio Gabrieli, Italian painter (born 1619)
- November 16 – Gottfried Schalken, Dutch painter (born 1643)
- date unknown
  - Ambrogio Besozzi, Italian painter (born 1648)
  - Ippolito Galantini, Italian painter and monk (born 1627)
  - Luo Mu, Chinese painter, poet and prose writer (born 1622)
  - Jacques Prou, French Academic sculptor (born 1655)
  - Carlo Sacchi, Italian painter and engraver (born 1617)
