= Mariano Sánchez =

Mariano Sánchez may refer to:

- Mariano Ramón Sánchez (1740–1822), Spanish painter
- Mariano Sánchez de Loria (1774–1842), Argentine statesman and lawyer
- Mariano Sánchez Fontecilla (1840–1914), Chilean diplomat and politician
- Mariano Sánchez Martinez (born 1959), former Spanish professional racing cyclist
- Mariano Sánchez (tennis) (born 1978), former Mexican professional tennis player
- Mariano Sánchez (footballer) (born 1978), former Spanish footballer

== See also ==
- Mariano Sánchez Añón Insurrectional Cell, Mexican urban guerrilla group in the 2010s
