= Cartagena Container Terminal =

Container management port in Cartagena, Spain

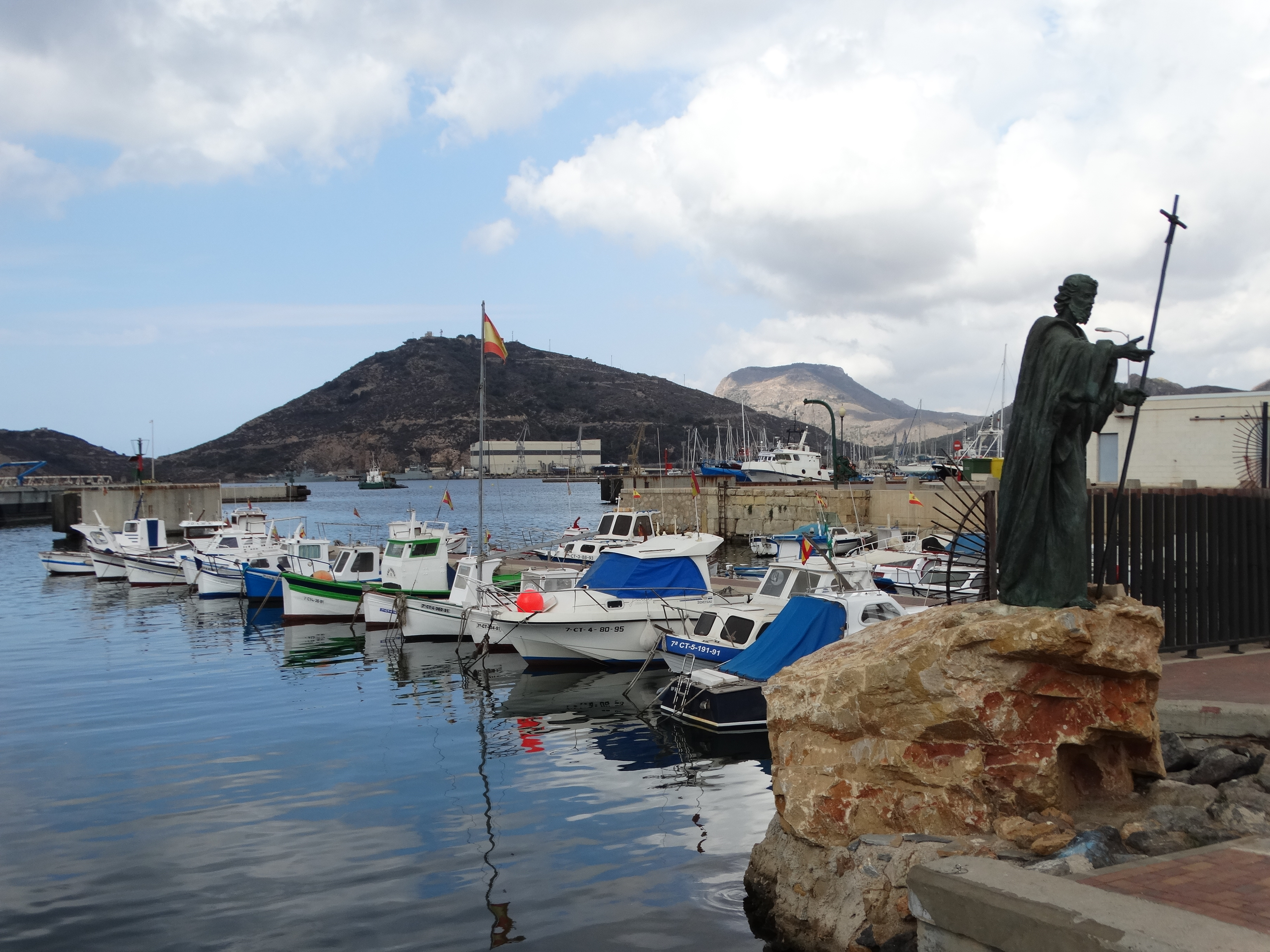
Statue of the apostle James the Greater, patron saint of Spain, in Santa Lucía's harbour.

The Container Terminal of the Port of Cartagena (Spanish: Terminal de Contenedores del Puerto de Cartagena), located at the Santa Lucía Dock, is the principal container management port of Cartagena, Spain.

It is part of the Port of Cartagena, which is located in the Region of Murcia, a predominantly exporting region. For this reason, there has been a strong commitment to container and cargo traffic in general.

The Port of Cartagena's dedicated focus on container traffic has resulted in sustained growth in recent years, reaching 72,000 twenty foot equivalent units in 2011.
