= Pavia (disambiguation) =

Pavia is a town and commune in Lombardy, Italy.

Pavia may also refer to:

== Places ==
- Pavia di Udine, municipality in Friuli-Venezia Giulia, Italy
- Pavia, Iloilo, a municipality in the Philippines
- Pavia Township, Bedford County, Pennsylvania, United States
- Ticinum, ancient city that became modern Pavia in Lombardy

== People ==
- Diego Pavia (born 2002), American football player
- Giacomo Pavia (1655–1740), Italian painter
- Philip Pavia (1911–2005), sculptor
- Manuel Pavía y Lacy, 19th-century Spanish general

== See also ==
- 17th Infantry Division "Pavia", World War II Italian infantry division
