= Portrait of Samuel Pepys =

Painting by John Hayls

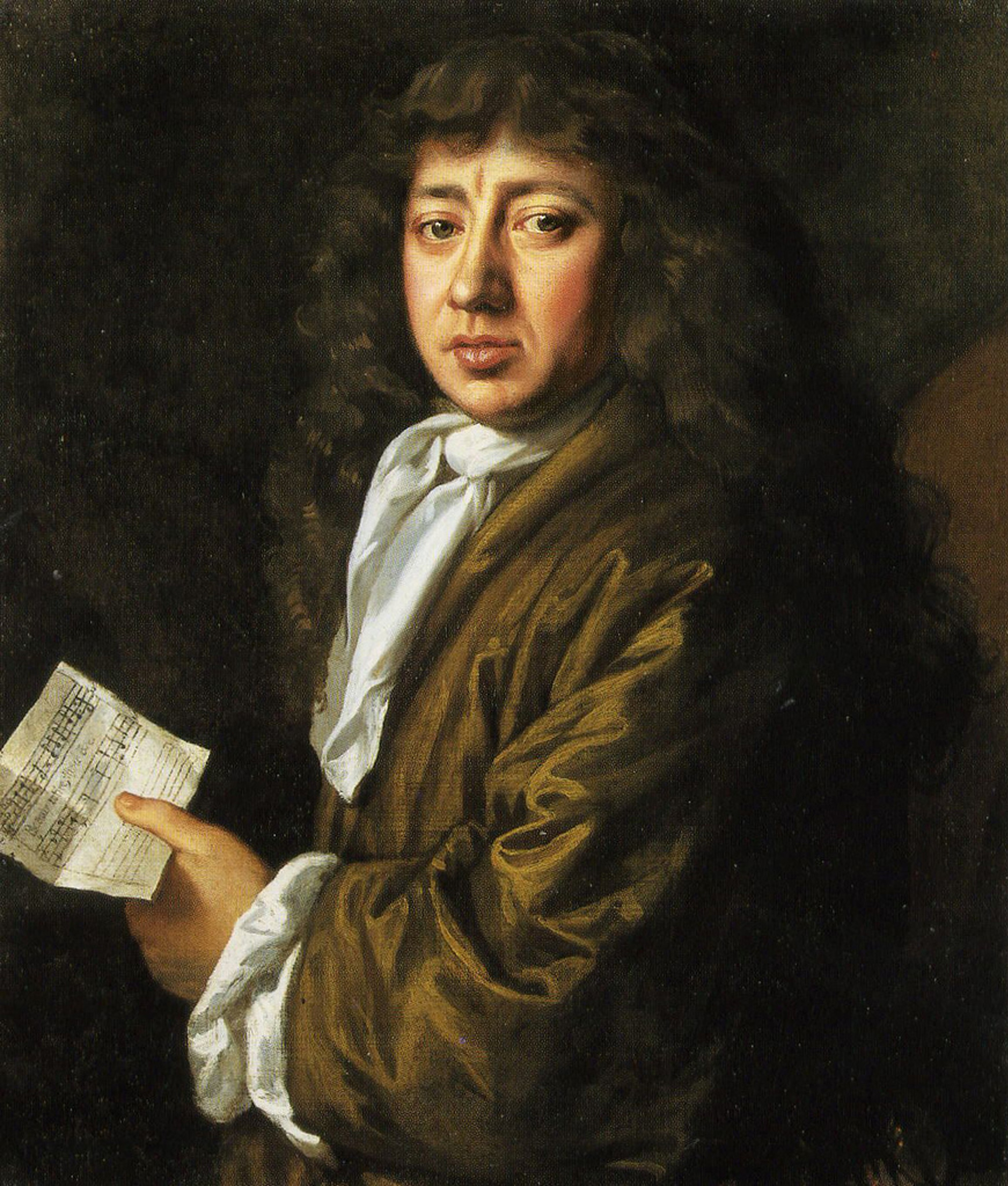
- Artist: John Hayls
- Year: 1666
- Type: Oil on canvas, portrait painting
- Dimensions: 75.6 cm × 62.9 cm (29.8 in × 24.8 in)
- Location: National Portrait Gallery, London

Portrait of Samuel Pepys is a 1666 portrait painting by the English artist John Hayls depicting the politician and writer Samuel Pepys. A long-serving Tory Member of Parliament and President of the Royal Society, he is best known today for his diaries portraying life in London during the Restoration era.

Pepys hired an Indian gown of brown silk to wear in the painting. He paid Hayls seventeen pounds for the work. It was painted from March to May 1666, between the Plague epidemic and the Great Fire of London. Pepys is portrayed holding a sheet of music. The painting is in the collection of the National Portrait Gallery in London, having been purchased in 1866.

== Bibliography ==
- Jordan, Don. The King's City: London Underground Charles II. Little, Brown, 2017.
- Latham, Linnet & Latham, Robert (ed.) A Pepys Anthology. University of California Press, 2000.
- Tomalin, Claire. Samuel Pepys: The Unequalled Self. Penguin Books, 2003.
- Willes, Margaret. The Curious World of Samuel Pepys and John Evelyn. Yale University Press, 2017.
