= Palazzo Balbi, Venice =

Palazzo Balbi
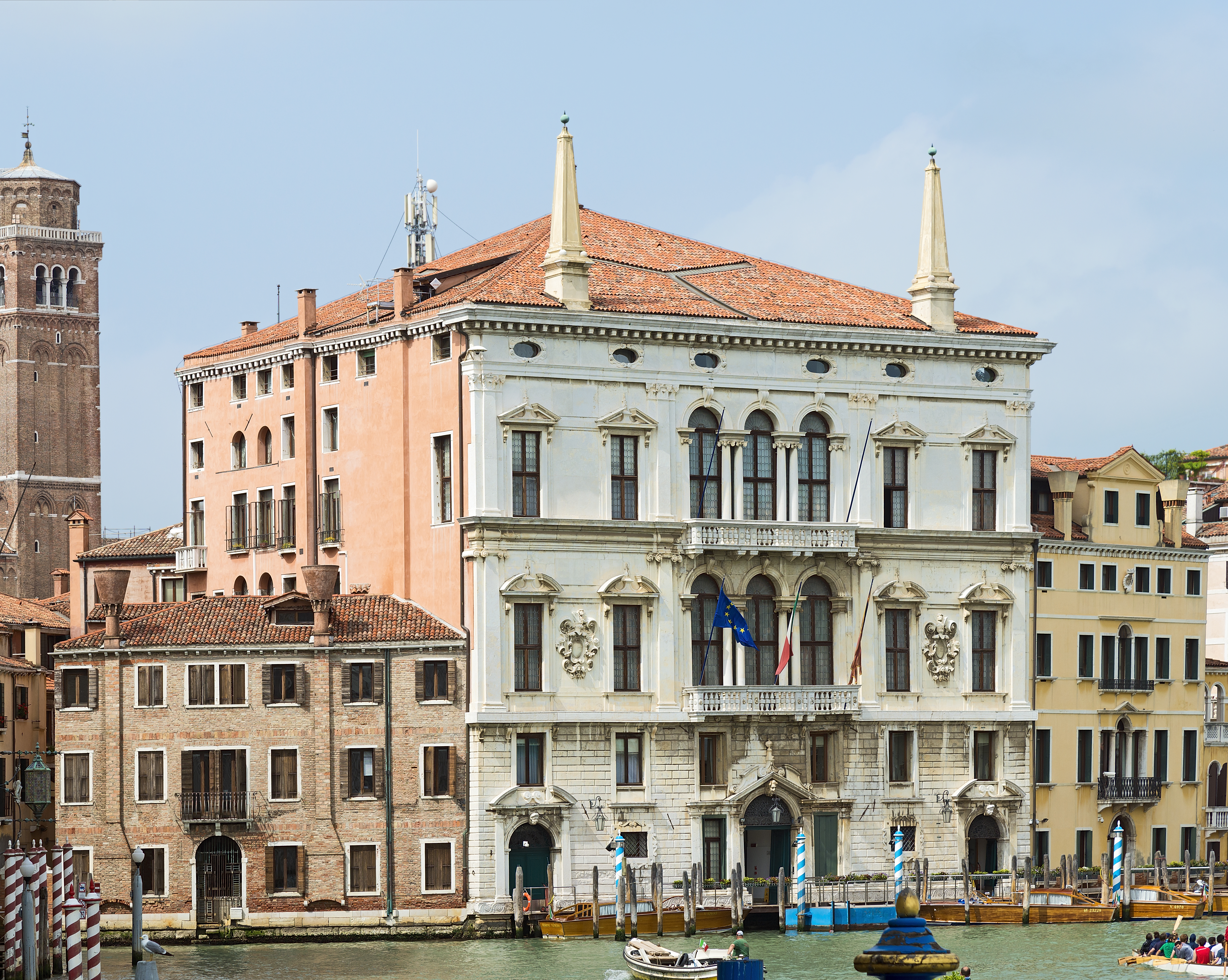

General information
- Address: Sestiere Dorsoduro, 3901, 30123 Venezia VE, Italy
- Town or city: Venice
- Country: Italy
- Coordinates: 45°26′06″N 12°19′37″E
- Year(s) built: 1582
- Owner: Veneto region

Design and construction
- Architect(s): Alessandro Vittoria

Palazzo Balbi is a palace on the Canal Grande, Venice, northern Italy. It is included in the sestiere (quarter) of Dorsoduro, to the right of Ca' Foscari. Currently it is the seat of the President of the Veneto region and of the regional council.

It was built from 1582, under design by Alessandro Vittoria as the residence of the Venetian patrician family of the Balbi. In the 19th century it was acquired by Michelangelo Guggenheim and later by the Adriatic Electric Society. It became a property of the Veneto region in 1971.

== Description ==
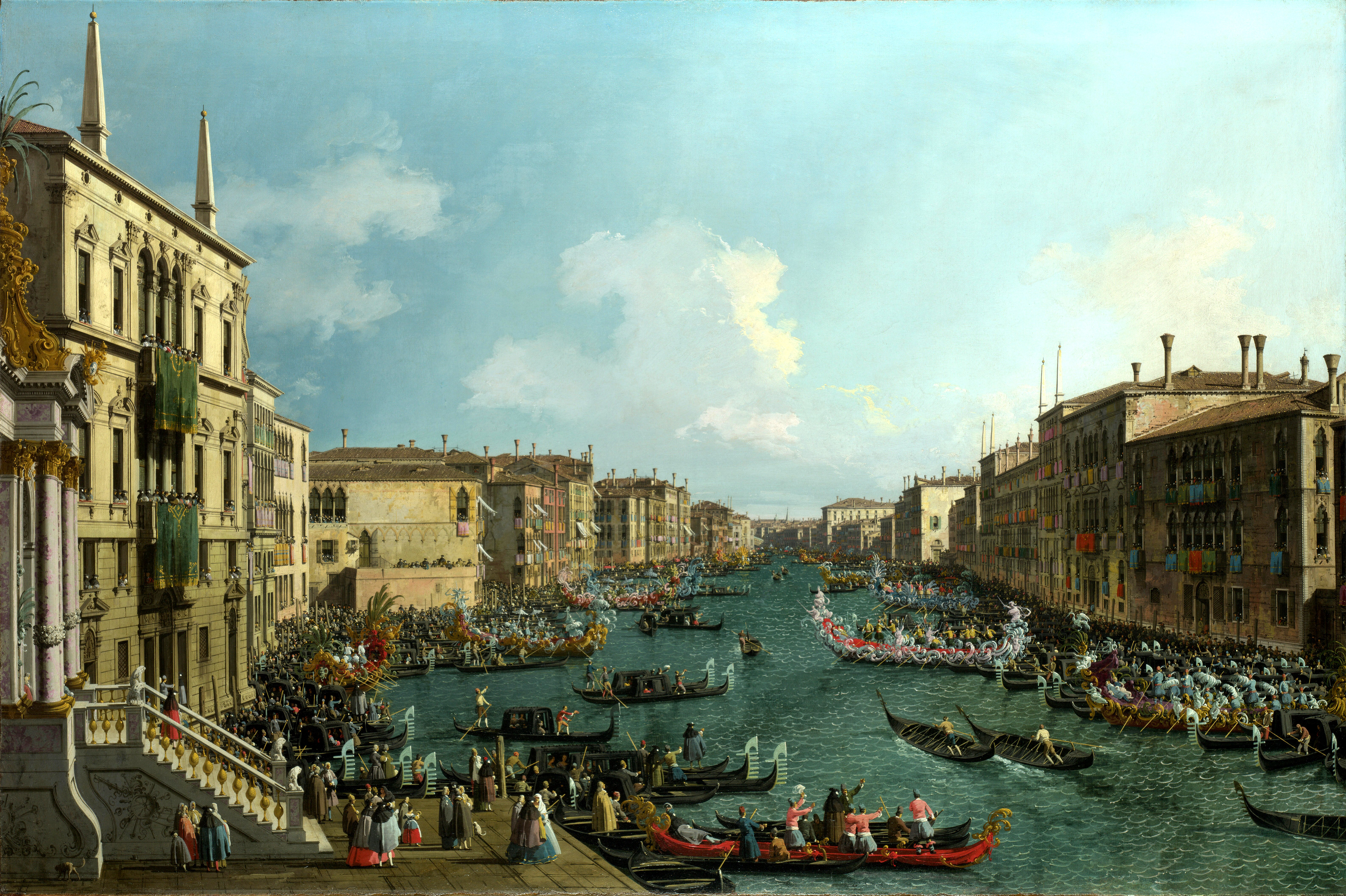
A Regatta on the Grand Canal by Canaletto, 1740, with the Palazzo Balbi on the left

The palace has two floors, over a double-height rusticated basement with a mezzanine and entresol, in a symmetrical façade on the Grand Canal.

The ground floor has a large portal in the center featuring a mascaron and tympanum; there are two minor entrances at the sides. The two ashlar upper floors are divided into three sectors by Ionic and Corinthian pilasters and separated horizontally by a wide entablature. In the center are triple mullioned windows featuring paired Doric columns and parapets. Between the first-floor windows are the coat-of-arms of the Balbi family. It is the first Palazzo in Venice featuring the window decoration of the interrupted tympanum.

In a frieze under the dentilled cornice are small oval windows in elaborate stone frames. On the top are two obelisk-shaped pinnacles, similar to those in the Palazzo Belloni Battagia.

The interior contains 18th-century frescoes by Jacopo Guarana.
