= Port of Cartagena =

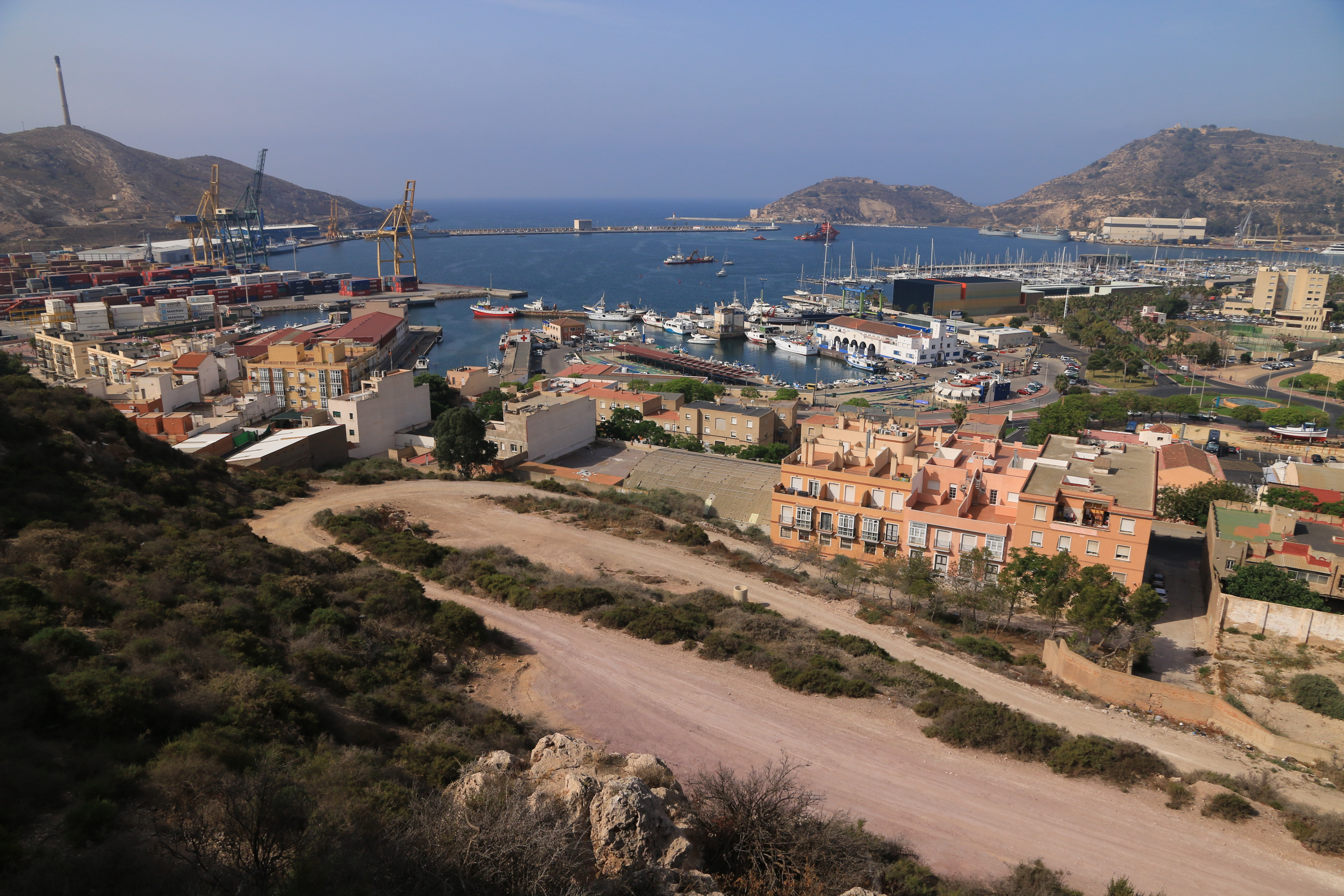
- View of the inner port

Location
- Country: Spain
- Location: Cartagena
- Coordinates: 37°35′00″N 0°59′00″W
- UN/LOCODE: ESCAR

Details
- Operated by: Port Authority of Cartagena
- Type of harbour: Commercial port, naval base, fishing port, marina

Statistics
- Website www.apc.es/

The port of Cartagena (Spanish: Puerto de Cartagena) is the port of Cartagena, Spain. It is the fourth nationwide port in freight traffic behind Algeciras, Valencia and Barcelona. It occupies the eighth place in relation to the number of cruises. 60% of exports and the 80% of imports from the Region of Murcia are made through the port of Cartagena. More than 40% of the tourism that Cartagena receives is made by its port.

It historical importance relies on both the good harbour offered by the natural bay and its strategic location near the East–West maritime route linking the Suez Canal to the strait of Gibraltar. It was used by the Punic civilization, and then by Romans. Besides its location, it also was appreciated at the time because of the metal ore mining (argentifourous galenas) in the surrounding mountains as well as the esparto exports.

In 2006, the Autoridad Portuaria de Cartagena proposed the expansion of the port with a new dock in El Gorguel. The estimated cost exceeded 1500 million of euros. The Port of Cartagena has two independent docks (Cartagena and Escombreras), separated from each other by a distance of 5 km by road and 1.5 miles by sea.

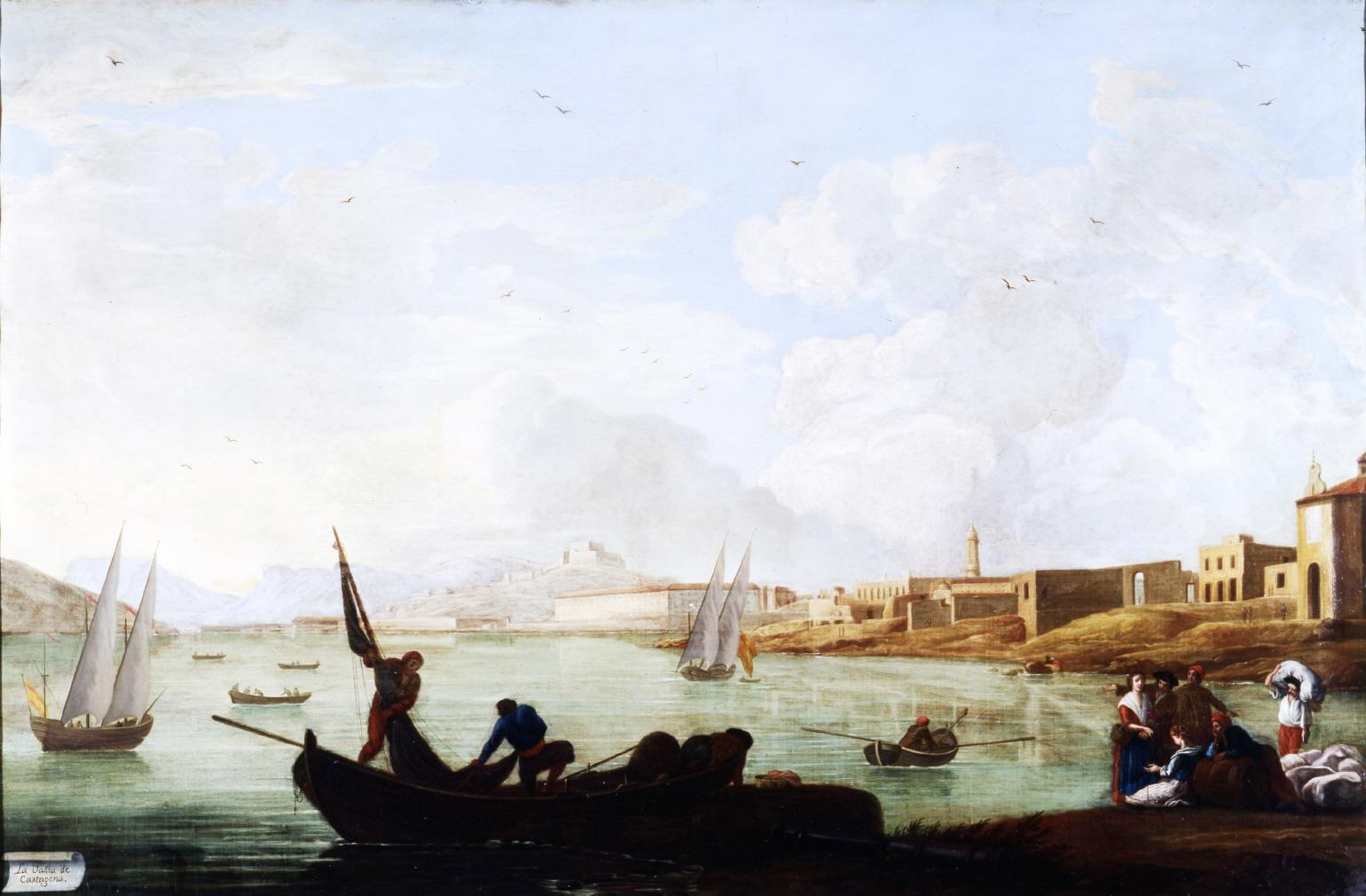
Puerto de Cartagena, by Mariano Ramón Sánchez (1793)

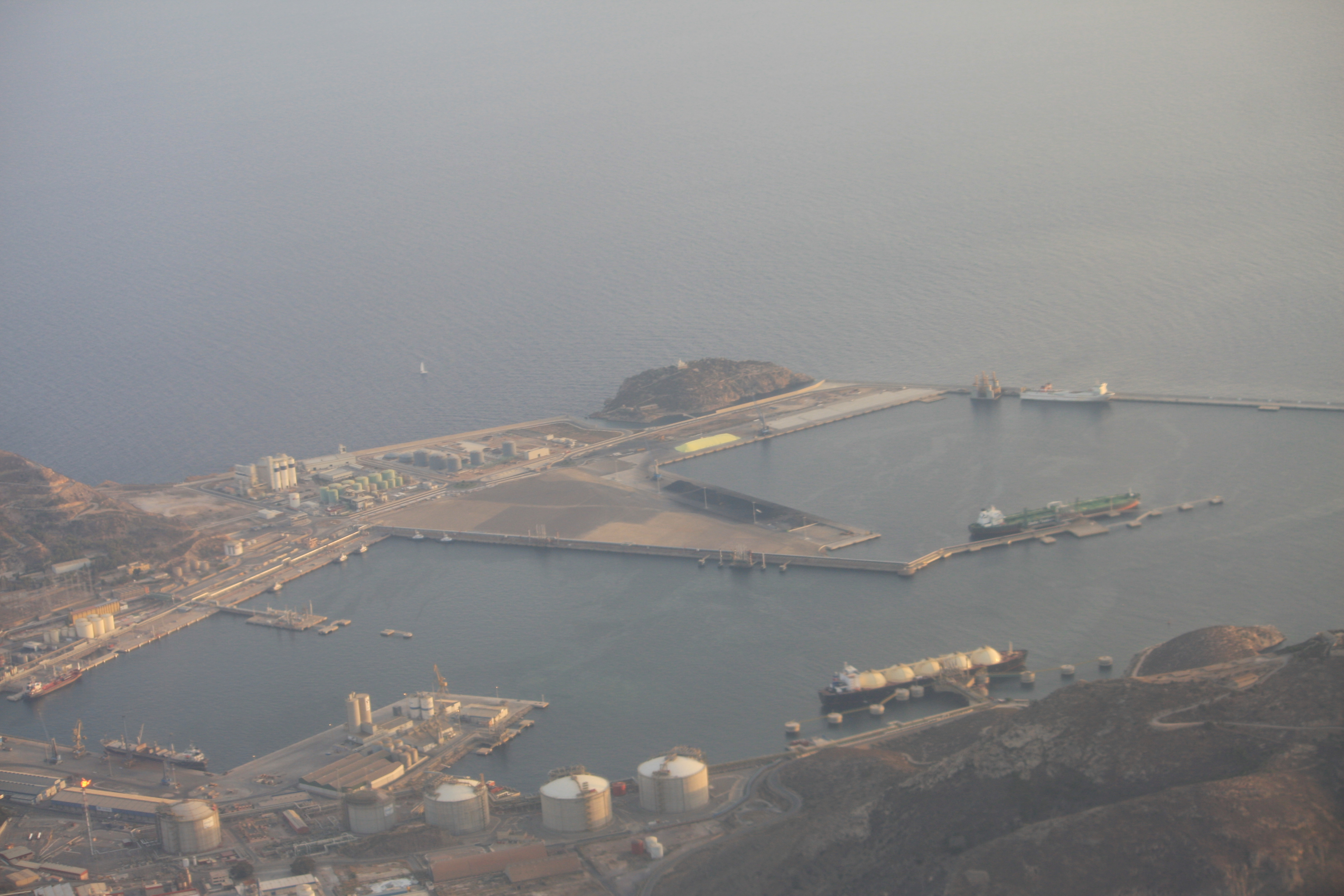
New outer dock of Escombreras
