= Innocente Alessandri =

Italian engraver

- Innocente Alessandri and Pietro Scattaglia, A Young Man with His Hands Crossed, c. 1760, engraving by Innocente Alessandri after Giovanni Battista Piazzetta, National Gallery of Art, Washington, D.C.
- Born: 1741; Venice, Republic of Venice
- Died: 1803 (aged 61–62); Venice, Republic of Venice
- Education: Francesco Bartolozzi
- Known for: Engraving
- Movement: Baroque

Innocente Alessandri (1741 – 1803) was an Italian engraver and publisher of the late-Baroque period.

== Biography ==
Innocente Alessandri was born in Venice in 1741. He was a pupil of the celebrated Florentine engraver Francesco Bartolozzi. Together with Pietro Scattaglia (1739–1810), he ran the Calcografia Magna on the Rialto Bridge in Venice. Between 1760 and 1770 Alessandri and Scattaglia created six plates based on drawings by Francesco Fontebasso, Giovanni Battista Tiepolo and Giovanni Battista Piazzetta. These depict busts of men of various ages and may have been intended for a series that was never completed. The technique employed is the crayon manner (maniére de crayon), which was popular across Europe at the time, but was only sporadically used in Italy. This technique allows for a freer, more fluid and expressive line, offering greater versatility and variety than can be achieved with a traditional burin.

Alessandri and Scattaglia used this technique for the plates of their most famous work, the four-volume natural history collection Descrizione degli Animali Quadrupedi published in Venice between 1771 and 1775. The Descrizione contains 200 finely drawn and hand-colored copperplate engravings. Much of the illustrative and textual content draws upon the renowned Histoire Naturelle by the French naturalist the Comte de Buffon, adapting its iconographic models for an Italian audience.

Alessandri and Scattaglia also worked as engravers and selling agents for the music publisher Luigi Marescalchi. Together with Marescalchi they were associated in the revival of music publishing in Italy after 70 years of almost total inactivity.

Alessandri's prints include Virgin Mary, with the guardian angel and the souls in Purgatory after Sebastiano Ricci; four prints, representing Astronomy, Geometry, Music, and Painting, after Domenico Maggiotto; a Virgin Mary with a glory of angels after Giambattista Piazzetta; The Annunciation, after François Lemoyne; and fourteen landscapes and a Flight into Egypt after Marco Ricci.

== Gallery ==
Bearded man holding a miniature of a woman, Leiden University Library

Man playing a lute with a boy standing behind him, London, British Museum

Portrait of doge Marco Foscarini, Amsterdam, Rijksmuseum

Portrait of Federico Savorgnano, Amsterdam, Rijksmuseum

== Works ==
- Alessandri, Innocente, Scattaglia, Pietro, Descrizioni degli animali: corrispondenti alle cinquanta figure contenute in questo ... volume de' quadrupedi, 1771.
  - Volume 1 from Internet Archive
  - Volume 2 from Internet Archive
  - Volume 3 from Internet Archive
  - Volume 4 from Internet Archive

== Sources ==
- Bryan, Michael (1886). Robert Edmund Graves (ed.). Dictionary of Painters and Engravers, Biographical and Critical. Vol. I A-K. London: George Bell and Sons. p. 15.
- "Alessandri, Innocente". Benezit Dictionary of Artists. Oxford: Oxford University Press. 2011. doi:10.1093/benz/9780199773787.article.B00002599.
