= David Klöcker Ehrenstrahl =

Swedish nobleman and portrait painter (1628–1698)

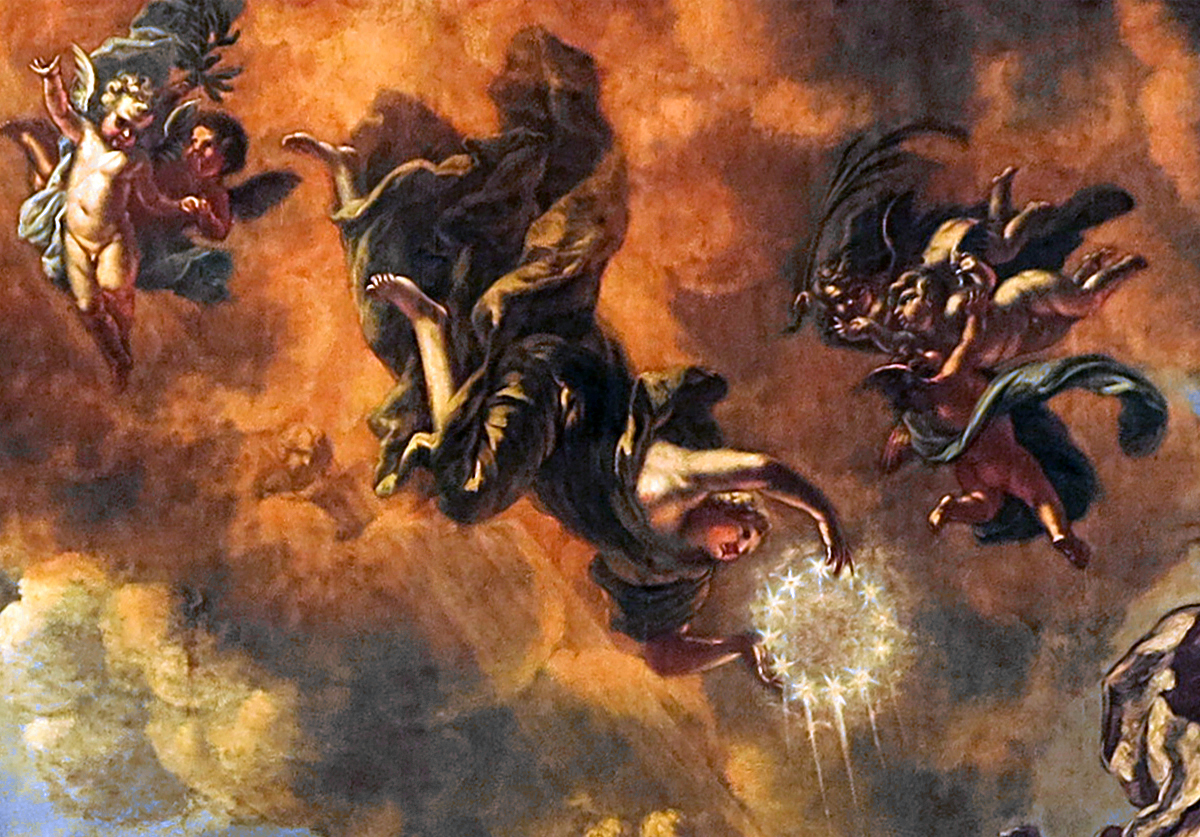
Crown of Immortality held by the Allegoric figure Eterna on the ceiling of the Swedish House of Knights

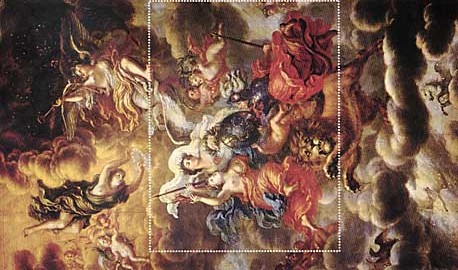
Ceiling of Ehrenstrahlsalongen at Drottningholm Palace. The highlighted portion became the motif for the 1000th postage stamp designed by Czesław Słania

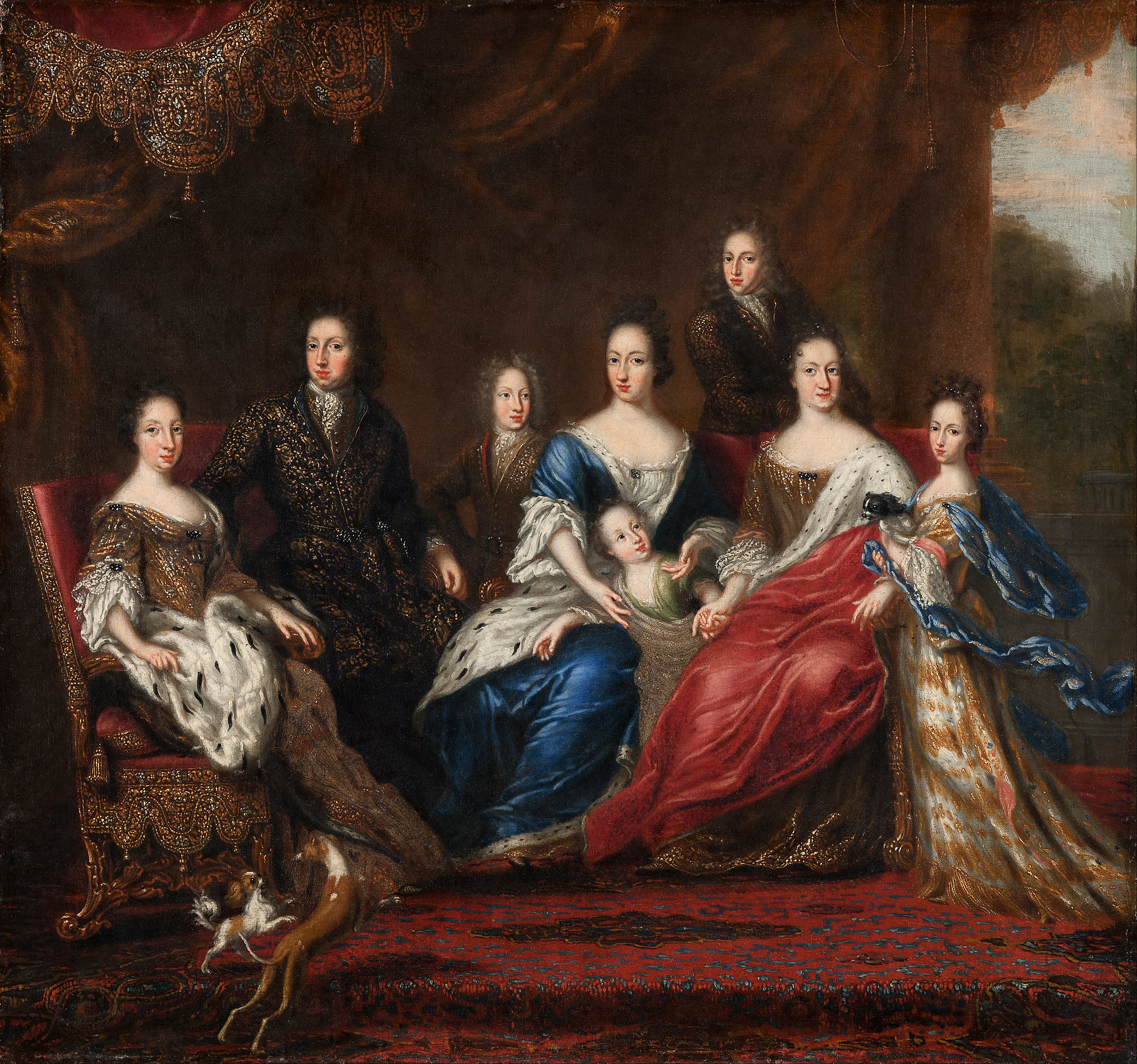
Charles XI of Sweden ’s family with relatives from the duchy Holstein-Gottorp, 1691

David Klöcker Ehrenstrahl (23 September 1628 – 23 October 1698) was a Swedish nobleman and portrait painter.

== Biography ==
David Klöcker was born in Hamburg. He was the son of Johann Klöcker and had eight siblings. In 1648, Klöcker traveled to Amsterdam where he learned how to paint following the instructions from Juriaen Jacobsze (1624–1685).

In 1652, he left his art studies in the Netherlands and moved to Skokloster Castle (Skoklosters slott) on Lake Mälaren, Sweden at the request of Swedish nobleman Carl Gustaf Wrangel (1613–1676). Between 1654 and 1661 he studied in Italy and visited the courts of both France and England. On his return he became entitled Court painter (hovkonterfejare) in 1661. He was raised to the nobility in 1674 at which time he took the surname Ehrenstråhl. He became court intendant in 1690. He made portraits of, among others, King Charles XI of Sweden, Erik Dahlbergh, Georg Stiernhielm and Agneta Horn. Among his pupils can be found Mikael Dahl and David von Krafft as well as his daughter Anna Maria Ehrenstrahl .

Ehrenstrahl also painted several ceilings and large wall pieces with allegoric motifs. The great hall ceiling fresco, named The Great Deeds of The Swedish Kings, in the Swedish House of Knights (Riddarhuspalatset) made between 1670 and 1675, is considered to be his greatest work. A second version was made during 1695 on the ceiling of Ehrenstrahlsalongen (the Ehrenstrahl parlour) at Drottningholm Palace, the home of the Swedish royal family. The center piece of the Drottningholm fresco also became the motive of the 1000th postage stamp designed by Polish postage stamp and banknote engraver Czesław Słania (1921-2005). The stamp was issued by the PostNord Sverige in March 2000.

Ehrenstrahl is also known for his proposal, in 1694, that:
- "Art presents riddles that could not be solved by everyone".

== Personal life ==
Ehrenstrahl was married to Maria Momma in 1663. He was the father of artist Anna Maria Ehrenstrahl (1666–1729) and the uncle of painter David von Krafft. He died in 1698 in Stockholm.

== Gallery ==
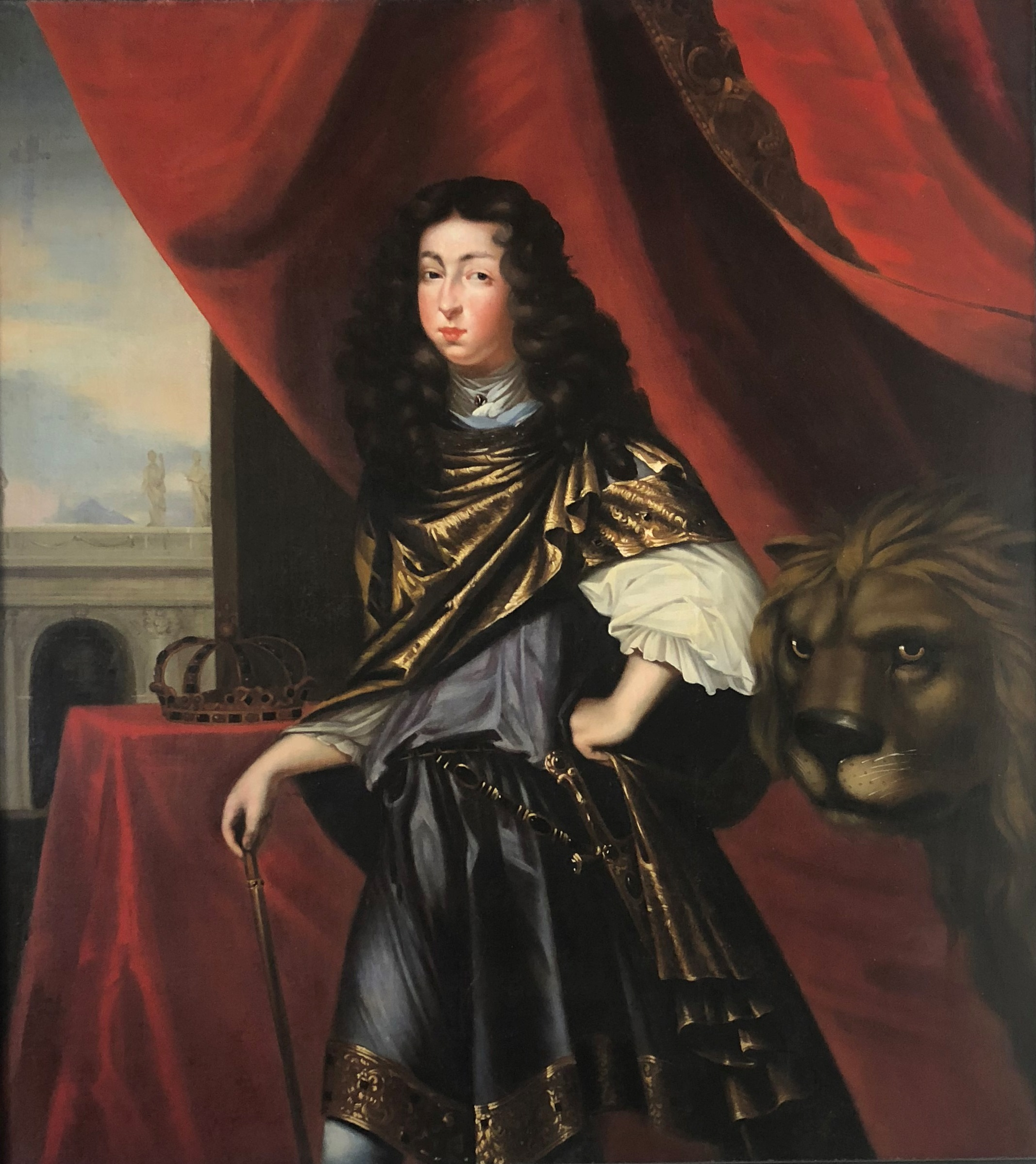
Painting by the royal painter David Klöcker Ehrenstrahl, depicting the Young King Carl XI of Sweden. Collection of the National Museum (Stockholm), located in Läckö Castle, Sweden.

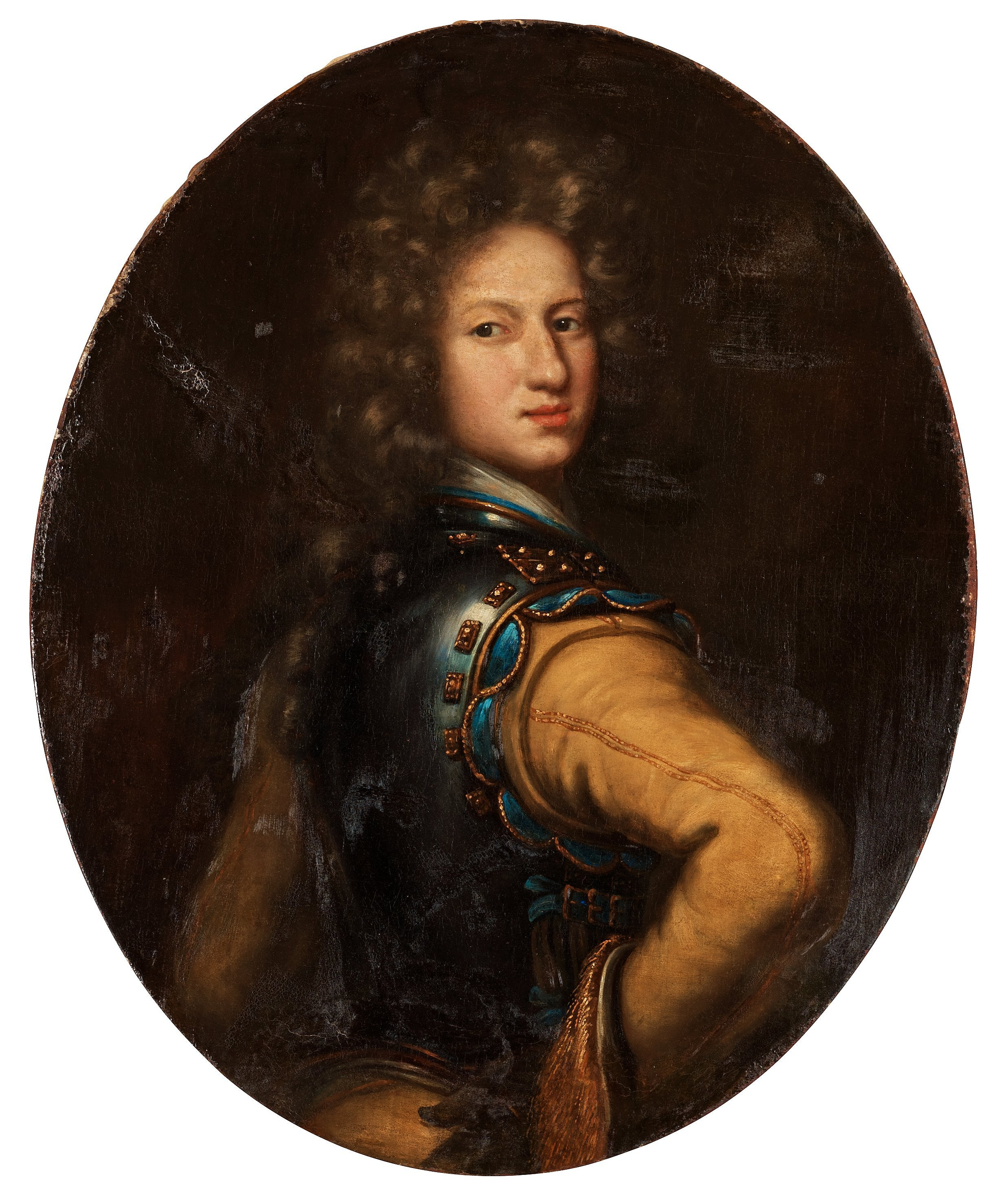
Portrait of Carl XII of Sweden, 1697

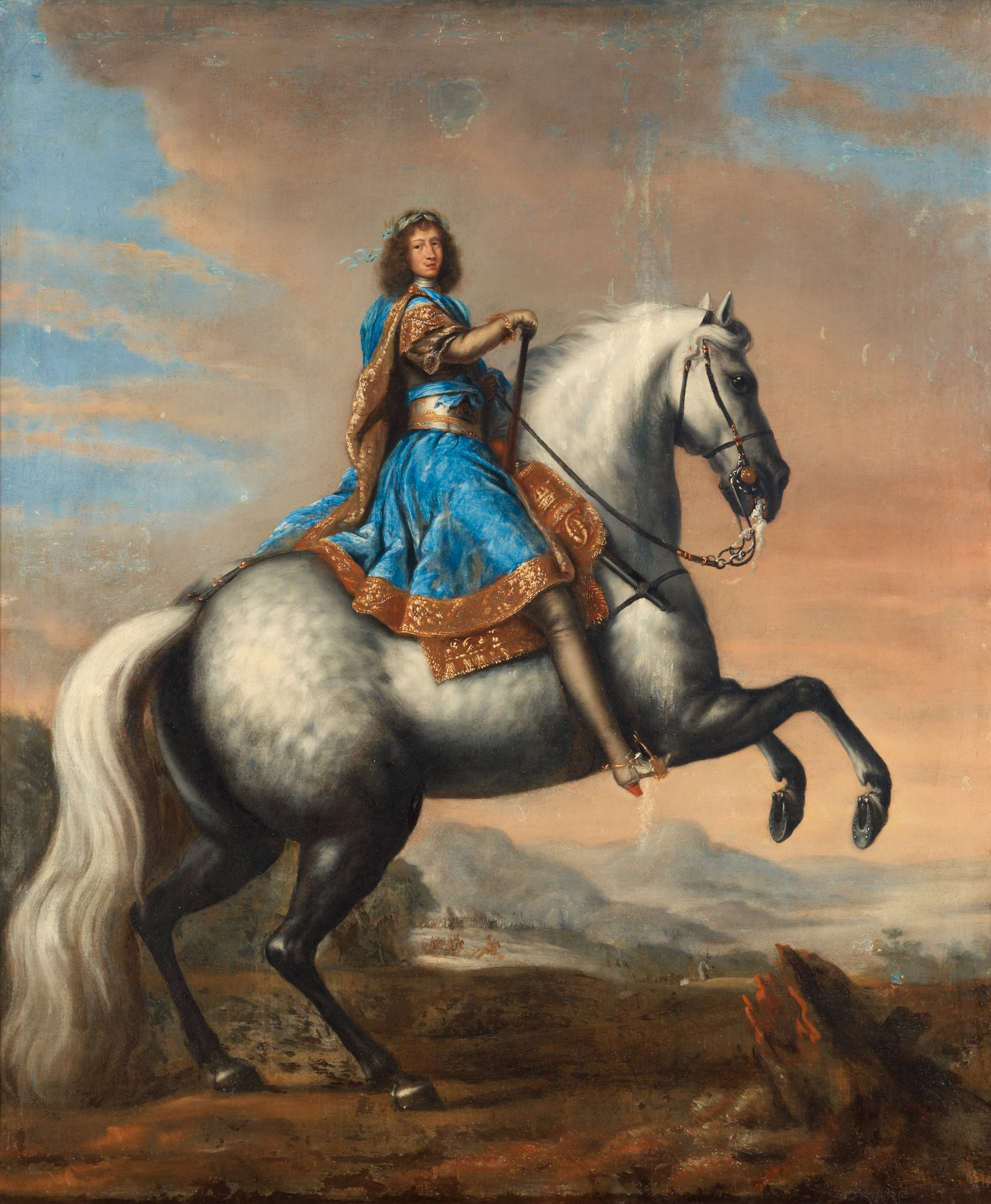
King Charles XI of Sweden riding a horse

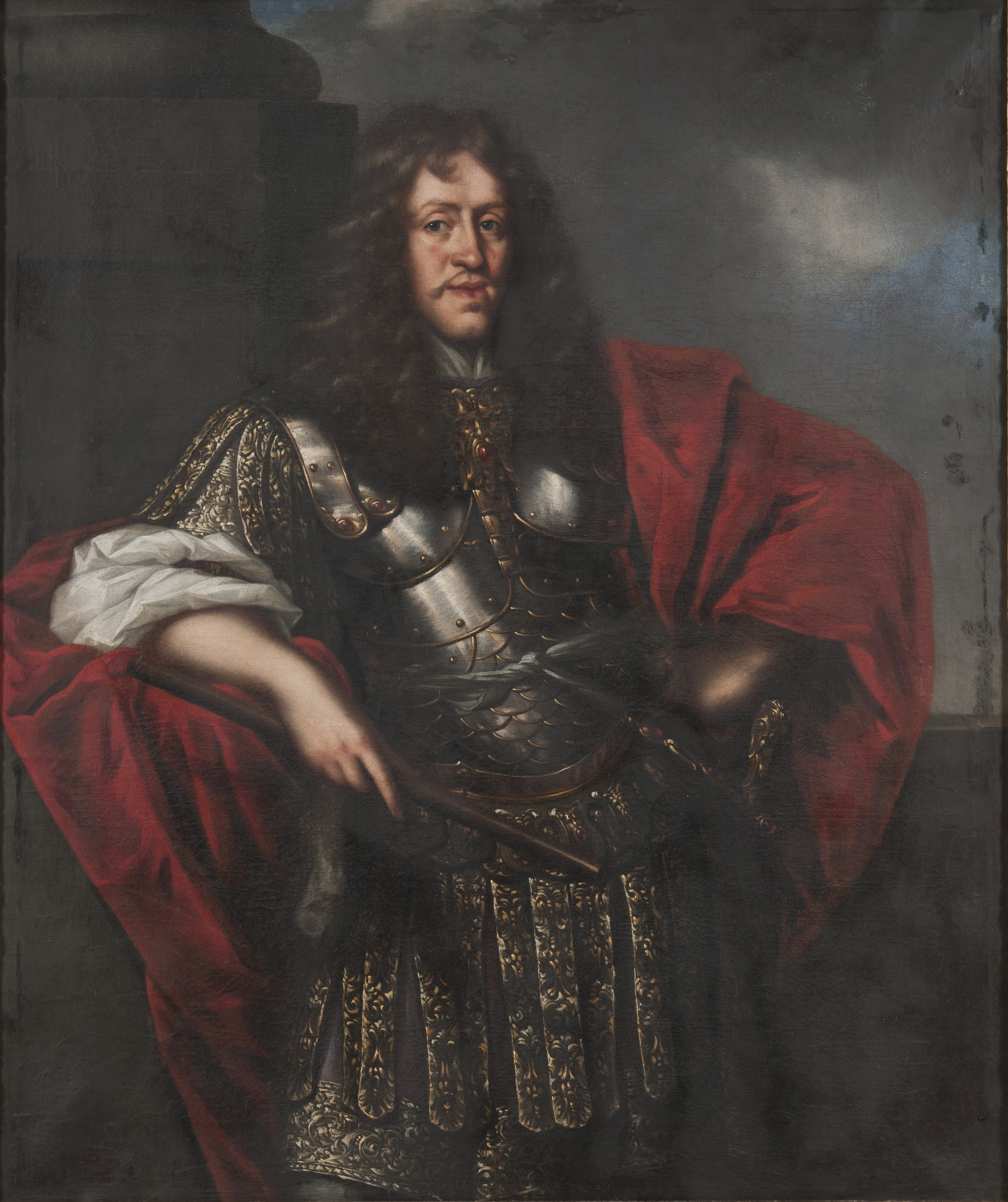
Adolph John I, Count Palatine of Kleeburg

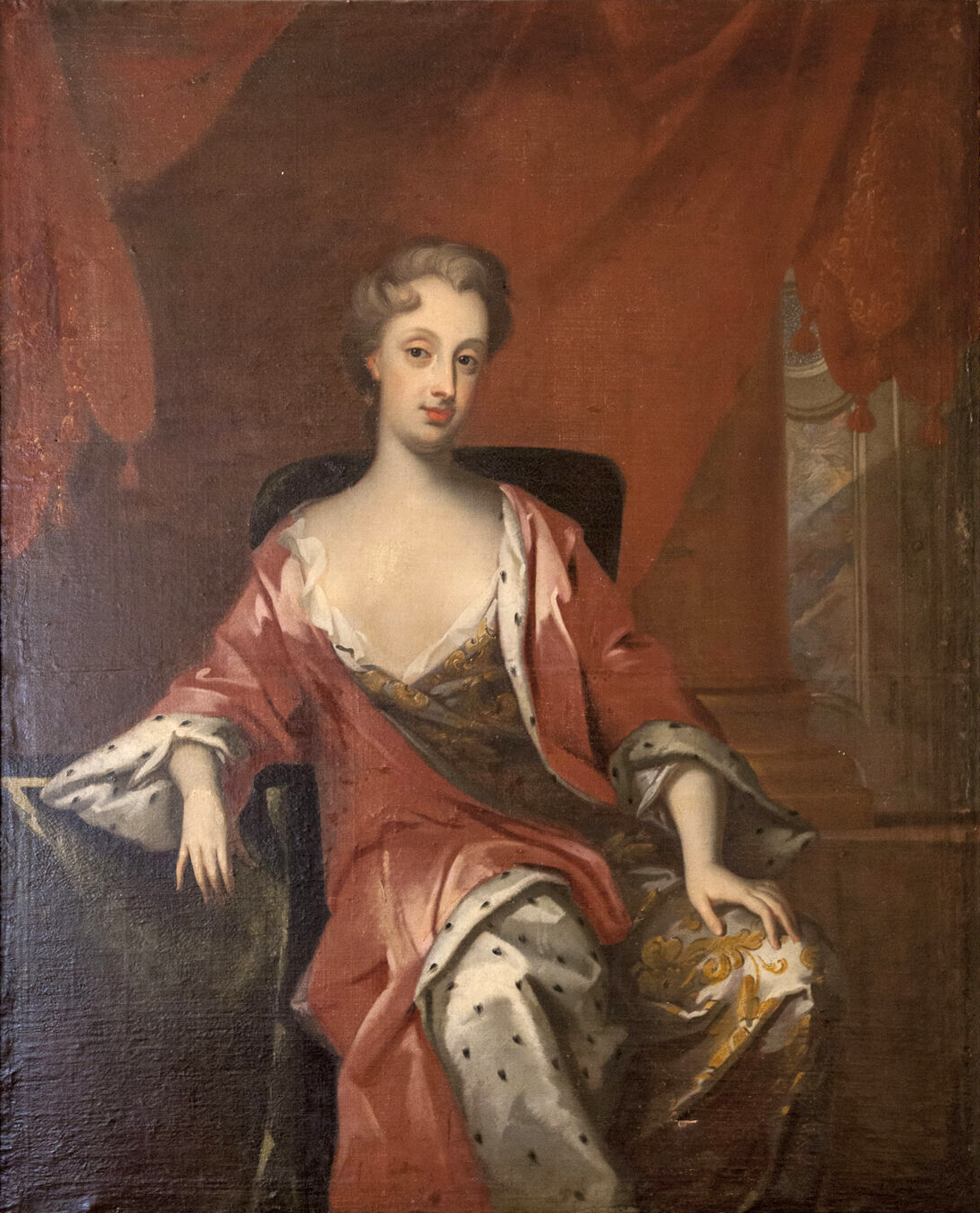
Countess Christina Piper in her youth, before 1698

== Other sources ==
- familysearch.org Accessed August 6, 2008
