= David von Krafft =

German-Swedish painter (1655–1724)

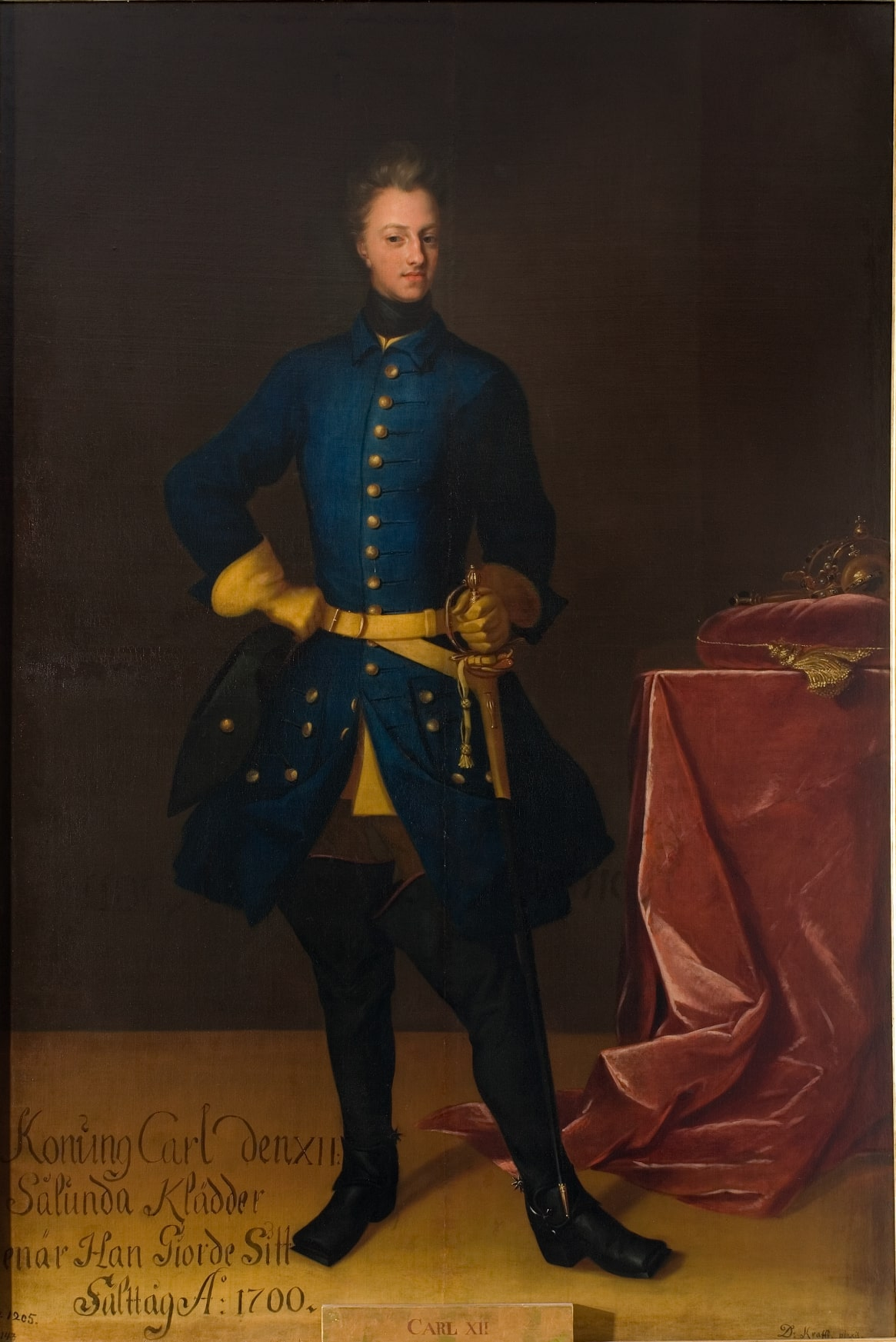
Charles XII, portrait by David von Krafft (1700)

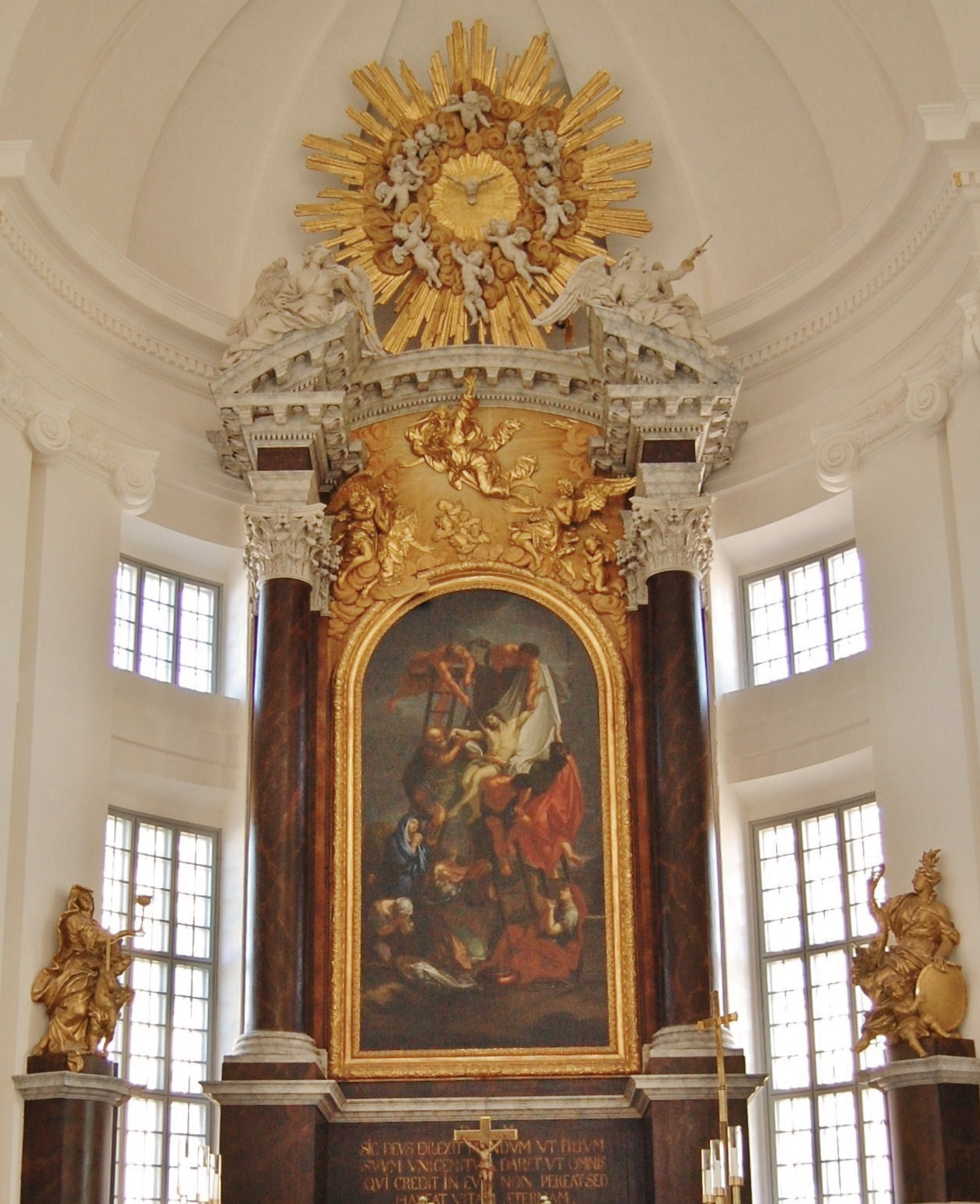
Altarpiece inserted in the columns at Kalmar Cathedral (1712)

David Krafft, from 1719 David von Krafft (1655 – 20 September 1724), was a German-Swedish painter, the nephew and student of David Klöcker Ehrenstrahl and his successor (in 1698) as painter to the Swedish Royal Court.

== Biography ==
Krafft was born in Hamburg. Krafft became an orphan at an early age. His parents' names are not known but his mother was a sister of the Swedish court painter David Klöcker Ehrenstrahl. Krafft was called to Sweden in 1675 by Ehrenstrahl, as his assistant and apprentice. Ehrenstrahl also became his teacher in the art of painting.

David Klöcker Ehrenstrahl had been born in Hamburg and settled in Sweden in the 1650s, where he was successful as a painter primarily of portraits of members of the royal house and the aristocracy. He was ennobled in 1674, receiving the surname Ehrenstrahl.

In 1684 Krafft received an annual grant from Queen Ulrika Eleonora the Elder for a journey to Italy through Denmark and Germany. The purpose was first to visit the various princely courts to paint the Queen's relatives to supplement her portrait collection, and later to continue to Italy for further studies. He arrived in Italy in 1687, spent a year in Venice, three years in Rome, and one year in Bologna. He later traveled to Vienna, and was awarded an increased grant for going to Paris in 1694. He finally returned to Stockholm and his uncle's studio in 1696.

After Ehrenstrahl's death in 1698, Krafft was appointed his successor as court painter. His main task was to paint representative portraits of King Charles XII of Sweden. His last portrait of the King before his departure for the war in 1700 was an equestrian portrait showing the King wearing a wig and an ermine cape. In the absence of the King, his main employer was the Dowager Queen Hedvig Eleonora; about a hundred portraits of her by Krafft are known.

Krafft's later portraits of Charles, which are among the most well-known and reproduced, show the King in the simpler attire he adopted during the campaigns: bareheaded and wearing a simple blue uniform, except for subtle details similar to that of the other soldiers in the army. In this case, Krafft's image was dependent on a type of portrait that had been developed in accordance with the directions of Charles himself, and first established with the 1706-07 portrait by the artist Johan David Swartz (1678-1729), a former student of Krafft who had been present in the camp at Altranstädt in Saxony with the King. This realistic but forceful image of the King broke with current conventions for royal portraiture and Krafft adapted the type inherited from Swartz and produced numerous copies from 1707 and 1717. When Charles XII had his residence in Lund in 1717, Krafft again got the chance to paint him live. As with the earlier portrait, based on the Altranstädt painting by Swartz, the Lund portrait was produced in many copies by Krafft and his followers.

His largest painting is the Hildebrand family portrait from 1713 at Nynäs Manor, (Nynäs slott) in Södermanland, depicting the merchant and industrialist Henrik Jacob Hildebrand (1636—1714) and his wife Anna Sofia Amya on the occasion of their 50th anniversary surrounded by their over twenty children and grandchildren, as well as some deceased relatives in paintings on the wall in the background.

Krafft also painted many of King Charles's generals. Besides his many portraits which were the major portion of his production, Krafft painted a large altarpiece for Kalmar Cathedral showing the Descent from the Cross (1712).

Krafft was ennobled in 1719, receiving the surname von Krafft, and awarded the title of court intendant (hovintentendent) in 1720. He died in Stockholm during 1724.

== Selected portraits ==
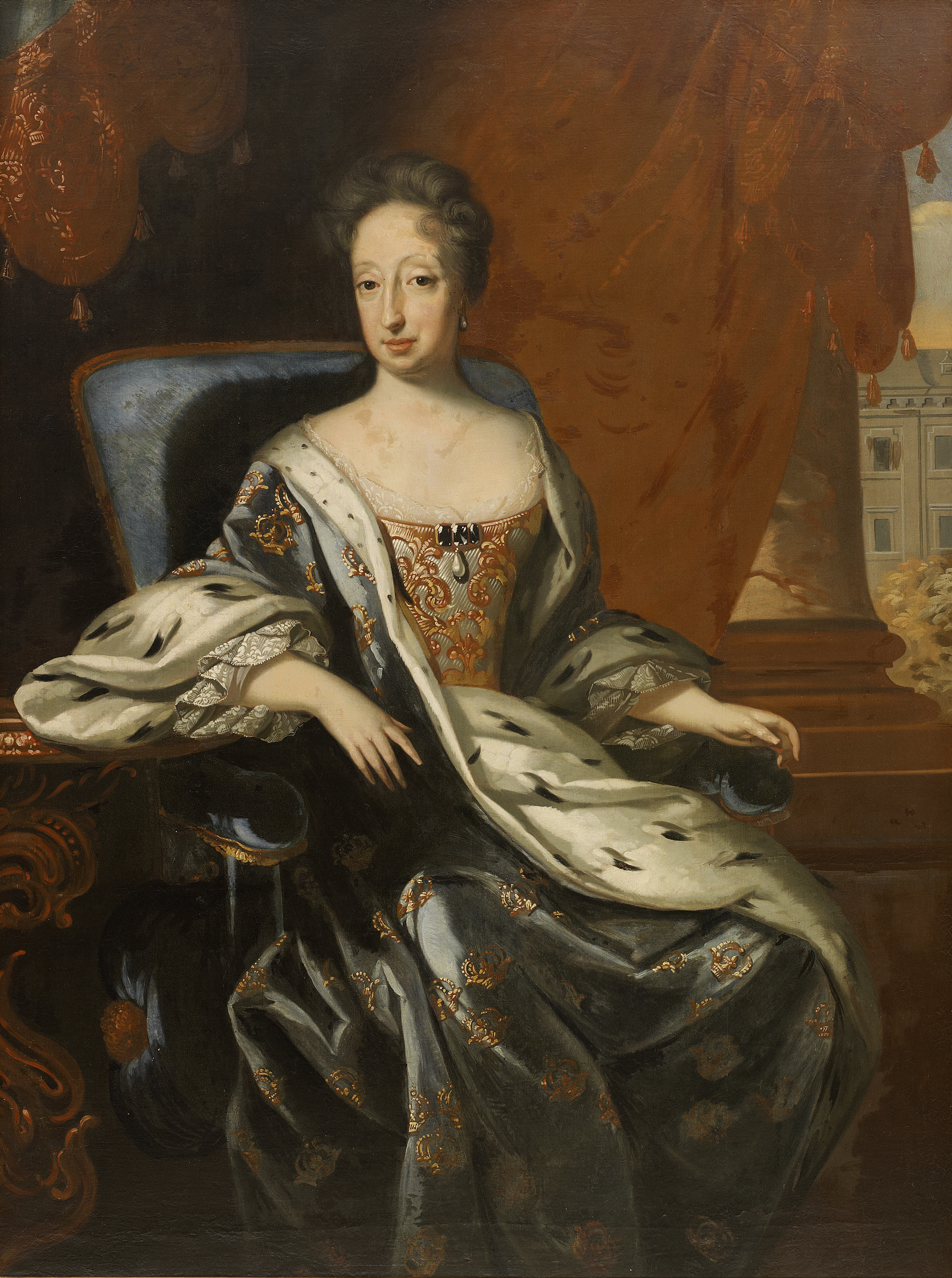
Queen Hedvig Eleonora

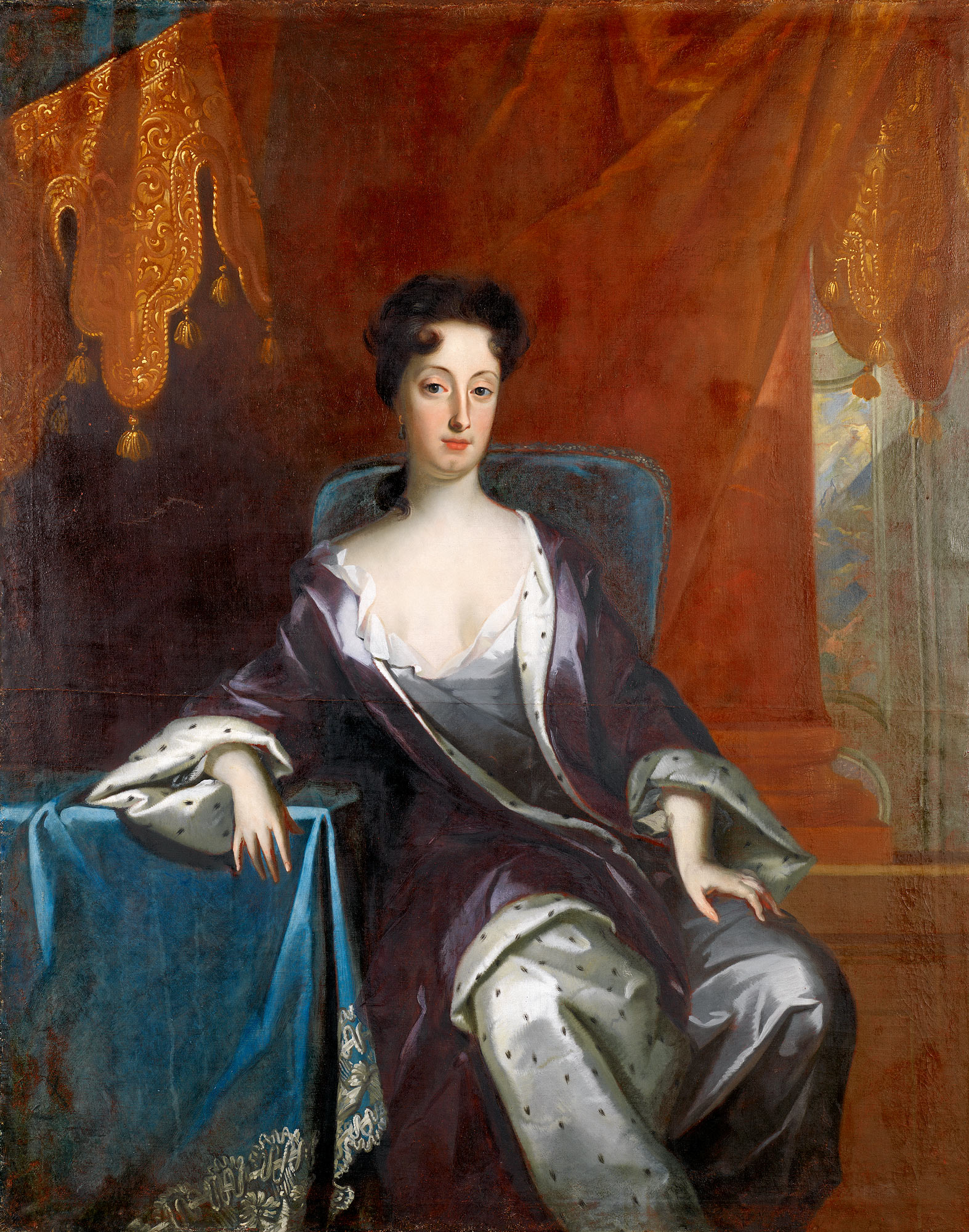
Hedvig Sophia

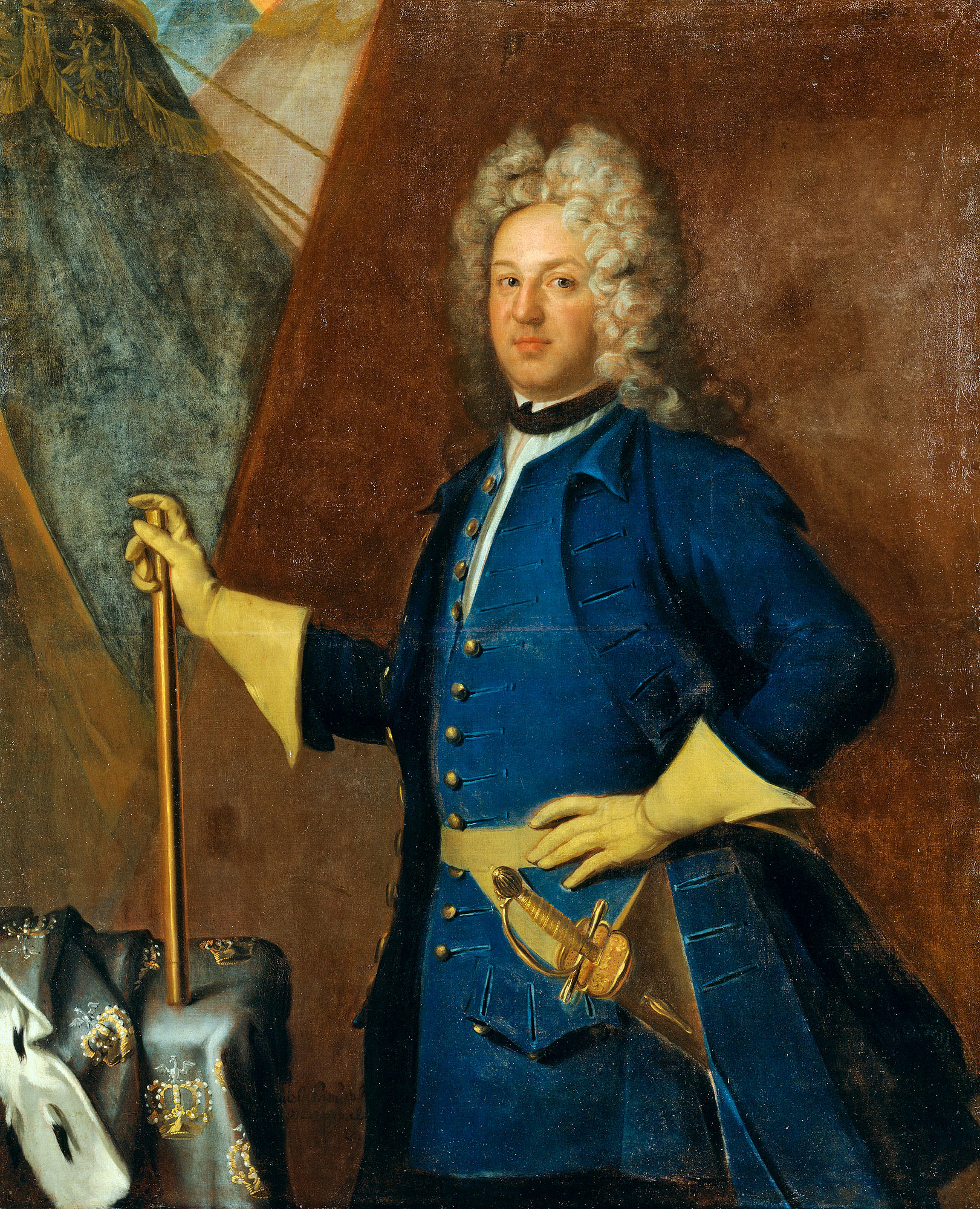
King Stanisław I Leszczyński of Poland

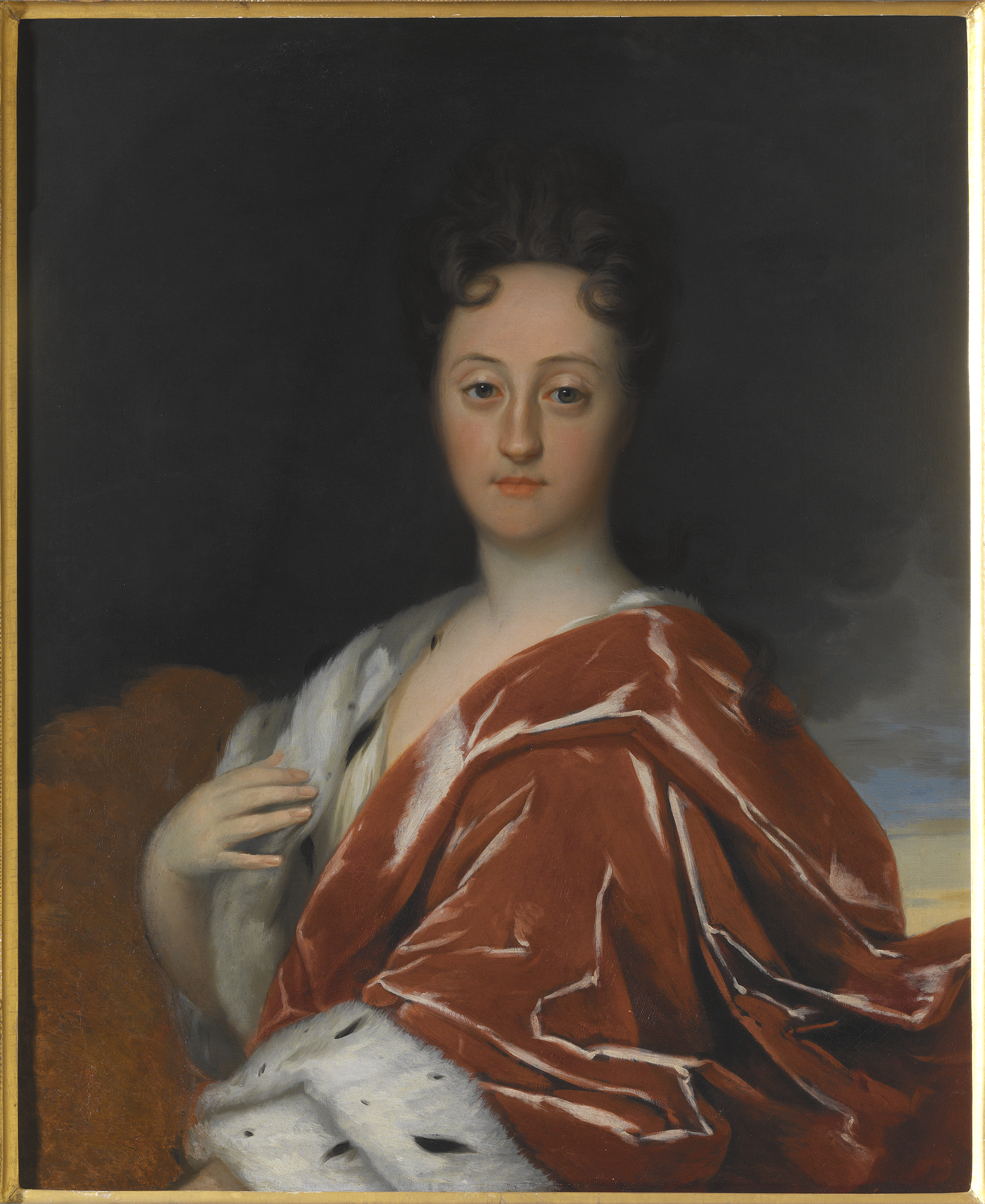
Queen Ulrika Eleanora

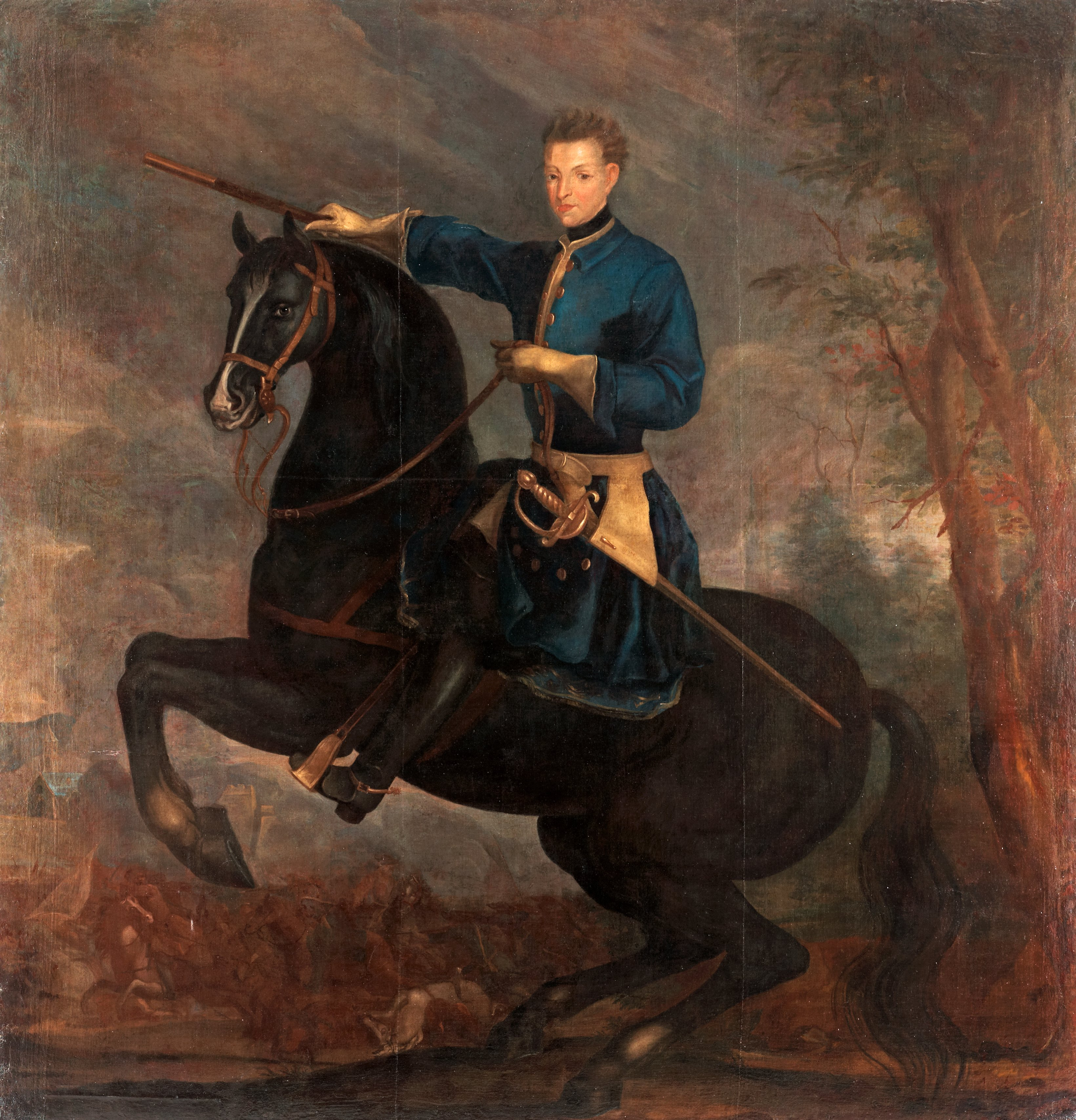
Equestrian portrait of Charles XII

== Other sources ==
- Ericsson, Peter, "Bilden av suveränen", in: Stellan Dahlgren et al. (ed), Makt & Vardag. Hur man styrde, levde och tänkte under svensk stormaktstid, Stockholm: Atlantis, 1993, pp. 148–174.
- von Malmborg, Boo: "von Krafft, David", Svenskt biografiskt lexikon, 21, pp. 515–518.
