= Johan Backman (painter) =

Finnish painter

Johan Backman (1706–1768) was a Finnish painter.

Backman was primarily commissioned to paint religious-themed murals and altarpieces for churches. In 1749 he painted the altar wall for the Kaarlela church in Kokkola. He painted the church pulpit in the Lohtaja church in 1758. Between 1755 and 1761 he painted works for the Kruunupyyn Church in Jalasjärvi. In 1756 he executed altar paintings for the church in Saarijärvi.
