= A Regatta on the Grand Canal =

Painting by Canaletto

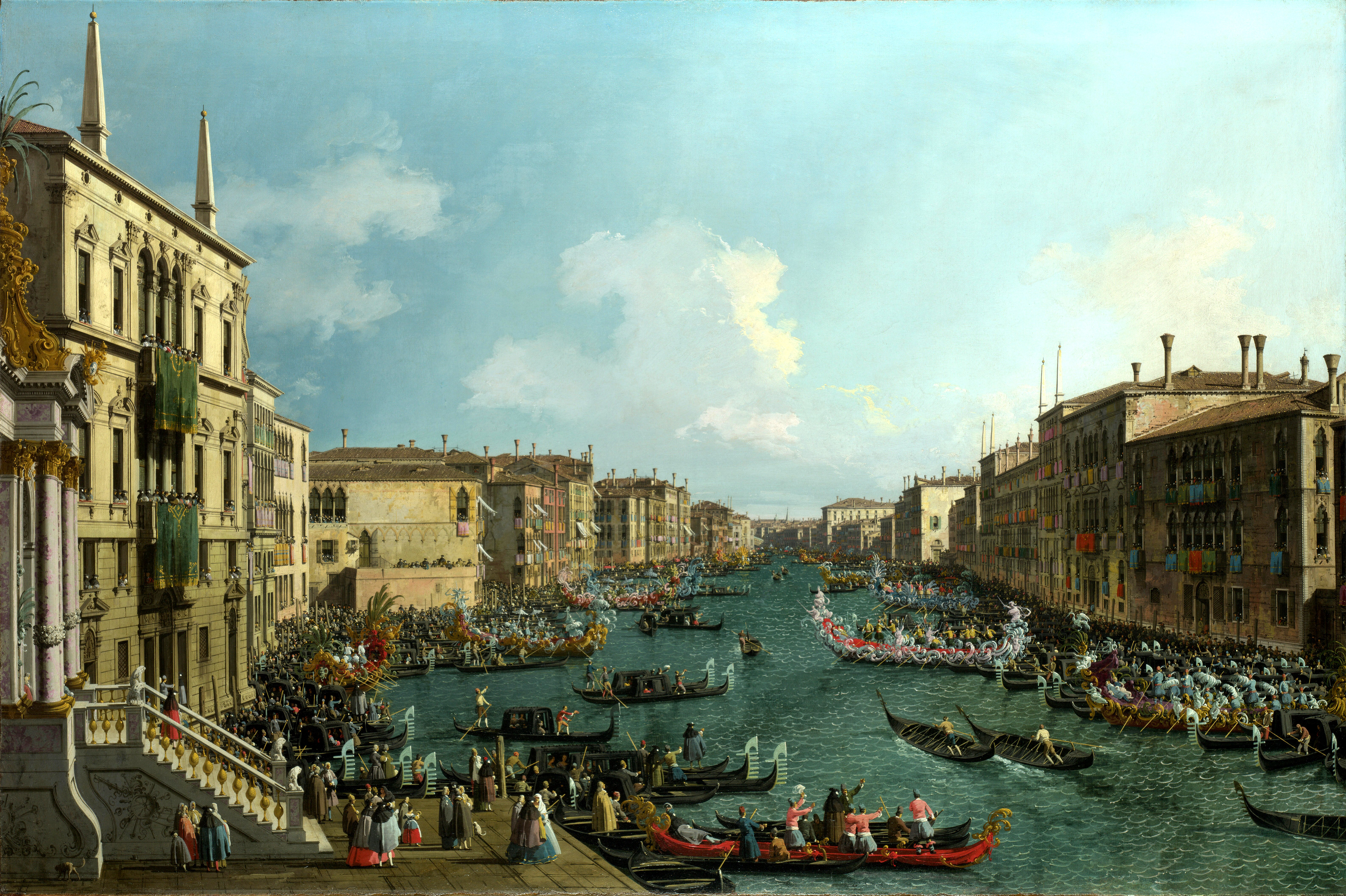
- Artist: Canaletto
- Year: c.1740
- Type: Oil on canvas, landscape painting
- Dimensions: 122.1 cm × 182.8 cm (48.1 in × 72.0 in)
- Location: National Gallery, London

A Regatta on the Grand Canal is a 1740 landscape painting by the Italian artist Canaletto. It depicts a view of the Grand Canal in his native Venice. It takes place during the Carnival season when the annual gondola regatta is being held on the Feast of the Purification of the Virgin. In the left foreground there is the Palazzo Balbi. By the 1860s the painting was in the collection of the Duke of Leeds at North Yorkshire. Today it is in the National Gallery in London, having been acquired in 1929. An identically-titled painting by Canaletto from 1735 is in the collection of the Dukes of Bedford at Woburn Abbey.

== See also ==
- List of paintings by Canaletto

== Bibliography ==
- Foxhall, Lin & Neher, Gabriele (ed.) Gender and the City before Modernity. John Wiley & Sons, 2012.
- O'Toole, Michael. The Language of Displayed Art. Fairleigh Dickinson Univ Press, 1994.
- Street, Ben. Art Unfolded: A History of Art in Four Colours. Hachette UK, 2018.
