= Lorenzo Pavia =

Italian painter

Lorenzo Pavia (died 1764) was an Italian painter of the Baroque period, active in his native Bologna, Papal States but also successively in Mantua, Duchy of Mantua and Verona, Republic of Venice, where he died. He painted quadratura.
