= Anna Maria Ehrenstrahl =

Swedish Baroque painter (1666–1729)

Anna Maria Ehrenstrahl Wattrang
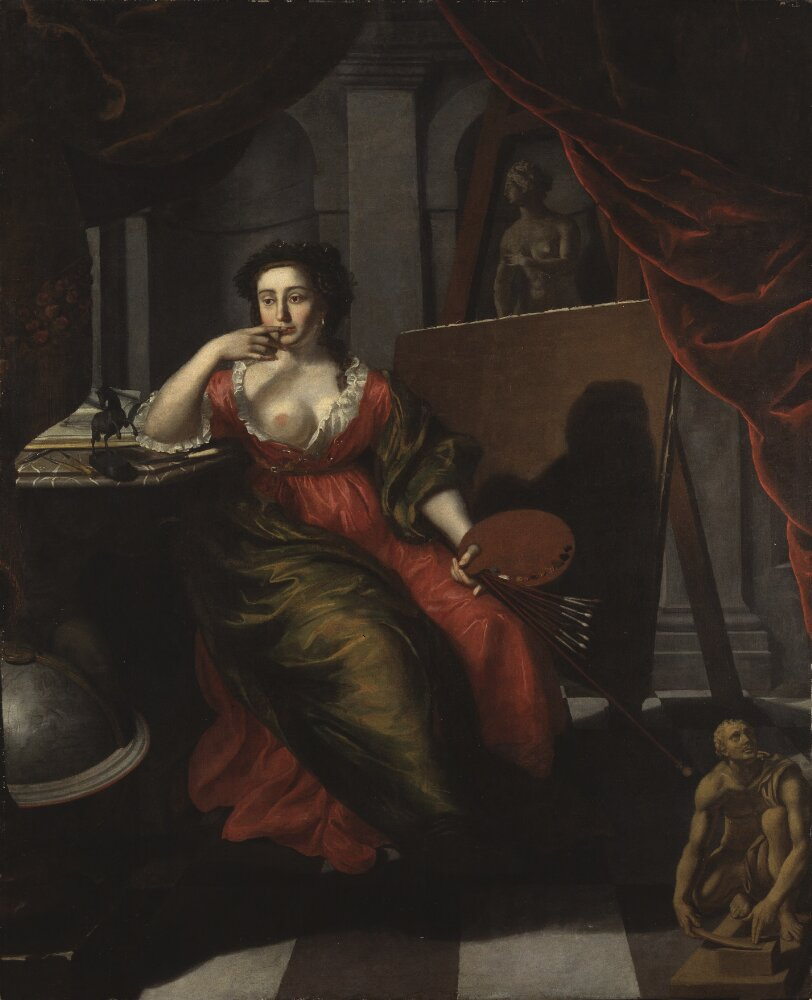
- Born: 4 September 1666; Stockholm
- Died: 22 October 1729 (aged 63); Stockholm
- Education: David Klöcker Ehrenstrahl (her father)
- Style: Baroque
- Spouse: Johan Wattrang

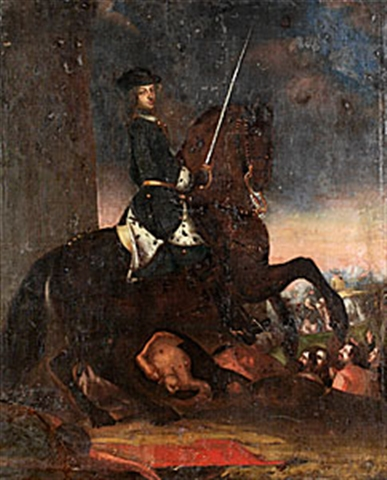
Anna Maria Ehrenstrahl, King Karl XII of Sweden

Anna Maria Ehrenstrahl (4 September 1666 – 22 October 1729), was a Swedish Baroque painter. She is known for her allegorical works paintings, portraits and group portraits.

== Biography ==
Anna Maria Ehrenstrahl was the daughter of the painter David Klöcker Ehrenstrahl and Maria Momma.

In 1688, she married Johan Wattrang (1652–1724), President of Svea Hovrätt. She is still, however, known exclusively by the surname Ehrenstrahl. At this time in Sweden, it was not common for women to assume the name of their husbands after marriage. As a private person, she has been described as a cultivated hostess in the home of her spouse. Because of her wealthy marriage, she did not have to be a professional artist to support herself, but she continued to paint her entire life, and still occasionally accepted commissions for money. She seem to have been a respected artist by her contemporaries.

Anna Maria Ehrenstrahl was the student of her father. She was early assigned by him as his assistant to paint details in his work in his studio. Her father entrusted her with commissions to his studio. She produced a large number of copies of the works of her father. Among them a portrait of King Charles XI of Sweden. At this time, copies was an art form with some status, and a lucrative task for an artist.

Her production consisted of allegory, gouache and portraits of people and animals, single and in groups, in the baroque style also used by her father. At the age of twenty one, she completed an allegory of the four seasons (1687) and an allegory of Cupid and Psyche. She produced portraits of Prince Fredrik and Prince Karl Gustav by commission of the Queen Dowager (1690), a portrait of Prince Gustav (1685), a portrait of Queen Ulrika Eleonora of Denmark, and of Aurora Königsmarck. She produced a group of portraits of six presidents of Svea Hovrätt: Magnus Gabriel De la Gardie, Gustaf Adolf De la Gardie, L. Wallenstedt, Gabriel Falkenberg, Reinhold Johan von Fersen and Carl Gyllenstierna (1717). She further produced portraits of the members of the Wattrang family, and work in gouache of animals.

In 1717, Anna Maria Ehrenstrahl donated six of her paintings to Svea Hovrätt, depicting six of its presidents. On this occasion, the writer Sophia Elisabet Brenner wrote a poem of admiration to her, which depicts them both as female pioneers of their respective profession in Sweden:

If I of inborn instinct rimes for my pleasure,
Your inclination is made clear by your work.
Though art may sometimes cost us hours,
There is no better way to be remembered by.
Let envy grine against us, let death tense his bow,
For neither scare your pencil, nor my pen.

== Sources ==
- Carin Österberg; Inga Lewenhaupt; Anna-Greta Wahlberg (1990). Svenska kvinnor: föregångare, nyskapare [Swedish women: pioneer, innovator] (in Swedish). Signum. ISBN 978-91-87896-03-3.
- Svenskt Konstnärslexikon [Swedish Artist Dictionary]. Malmö: Allhems Förlag.
