= Giacomo Pavia =

Italian painter

Giacomo Pavia (1655–1749) was an Italian painter of the Baroque period, active mainly in his native Bologna, Papal States. He studied and worked under Giuseppe Maria Crespi and Giovanni Gioseffo dal Sole. He died in Spain. His son Lorenzo Pavia painted quadratura.
