= John Hayls =

English painter

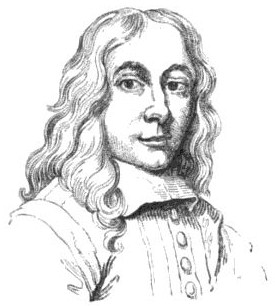
- Illustration of Hayls (from Walpole's "Anecdotes of painting", volume 2)
- Born: 1600
- Died: 1679 (aged 78–79)
- Known for: Portrait-painter

John Hayls (1600–1679), also Hailes, was an English Baroque-era portrait painter, principally known for his portrait of Samuel Pepys.

== Life and work ==
Hayls was a contemporary and rival of Sir Peter Lely and Samuel Cooper. He was mentioned in the diary of Samuel Pepys where he is referred to as "Hales". An extract from 15 February 1665-6 reads, "Mr Hales began my wife's portrait in the posture we saw one of my Lady Peters, like a St. Katherine".

Another extract of 17 March 1666 read:

"...at noon, home to dinner, and presently with my wife out to Hales's, where I am still infinitely pleased with my wife's picture. I paid him 14l for it, and 25s for the frame, and I think it is not a whit too dear for so good a picture. It is not yet quite finished and dry, so as to be fit to bring home yet. This day I begin to sit, and he will make me, I think, a very fine picture. He promises it shall be as good as my wife's, and I sit to have it full of shadows, and do almost break my neck looking over my shoulder to make the posture for him to work by."

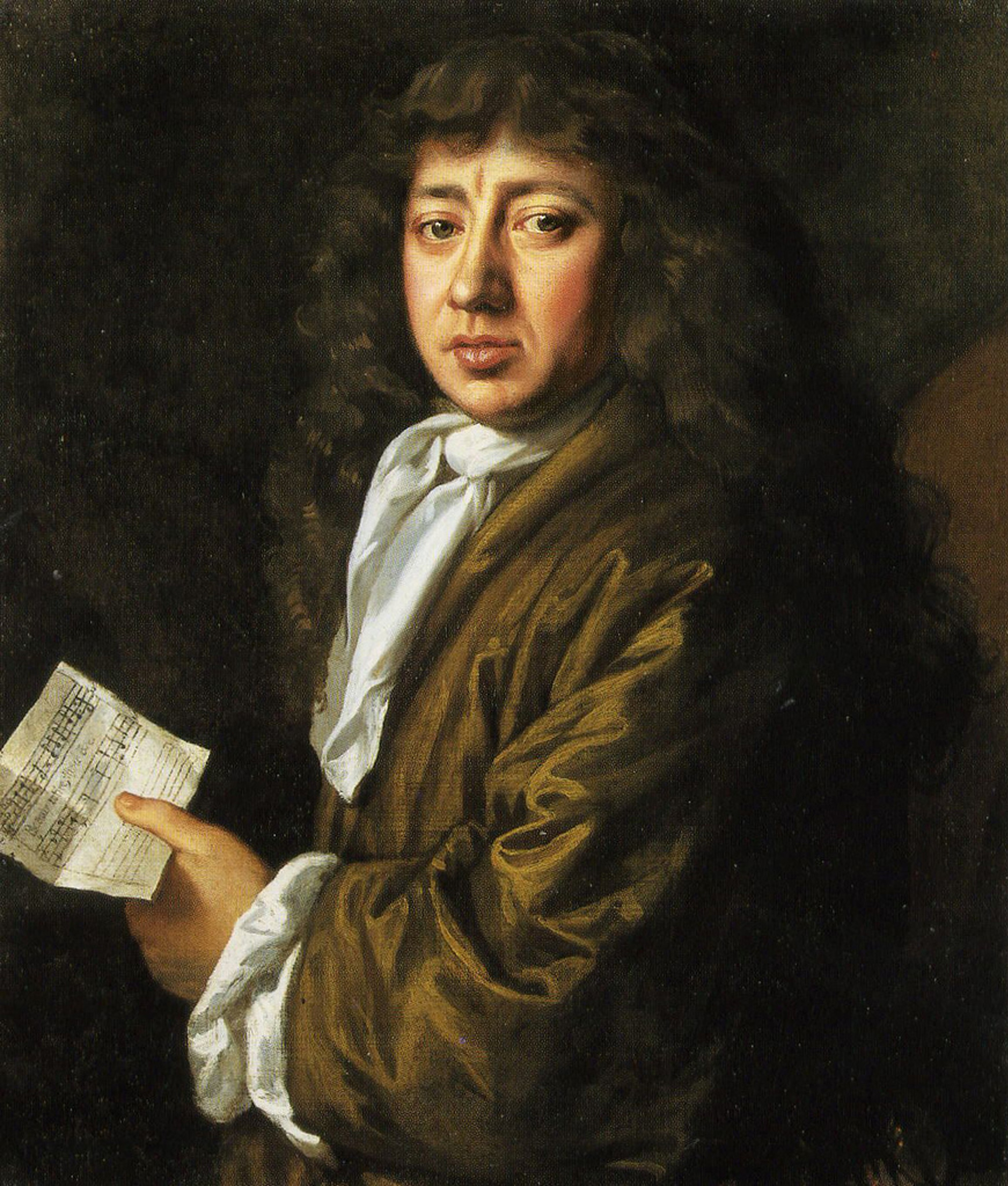
Portrait of Samuel Pepys by "Mr Hales" (1666)

Pepys was, evidently, so pleased with his wife's portrait, that he commissioned a portrait of himself (see image), and also persuaded his father Thomas Pepys to sit for the artist. Pepys also mentioned that Hayls painted the actor Joseph Harris as Henry V.

Hayls also painted portraits of Colonel John Russell (third son of Francis Russell, 4th Earl of Bedford), Lady Diana Russell, and the poet Thomas Flatman. He was known as a good copyist of the works of Van Dyck. He lived in Southampton Street, Bloomsbury, London, for some years, but then moved to a house in Long Acre, where he died suddenly in 1679.

John Hoskins painted a limning of Hayls, a drawing of which was made by George Vertue (now in the British Museum)
