= Antonio Lorenzini =

Italian painter

Antonio Lorenzini (1655–1740) was an Italian painter and engraver of the Baroque, active in his native Bologna, as well as in Florence. He was also called the Frate Antonio (Brother Anthony). He was a pupil of Lorenzo Pasinelli. It is said that while engraving works in the church of San Francesco in Bologna, specifically the canvas by Pasinelli, where St Anthony of Padua liberates the soul of his father from Purgatory, Lorenzini was inspired to become a Franciscan.

In 1709, he moved to Florence and again took up art, making engravings of works in the Medici gallery, working with Theodor Verkruys, Mogalli, and Picchianti. After about 30 years, he returned to Bologna, and joined the Accademia Clementina. Among his engravings are Martyrdom of St Ursula by Pasinelli, Annunciation by Veronese, Christ on the sea with St Peter by Lodovico Caracci, Repose of Venus by Cignani, Jacob Sold to Slavery by Brothers by Andrea del Sarto, Saul and David with Head of Goliath by Guercino, Mary at Christ's Tomb by Pietro da Cortona, and Noah's Ark by Bassano.
