= Jacques Prou =

French sculptor

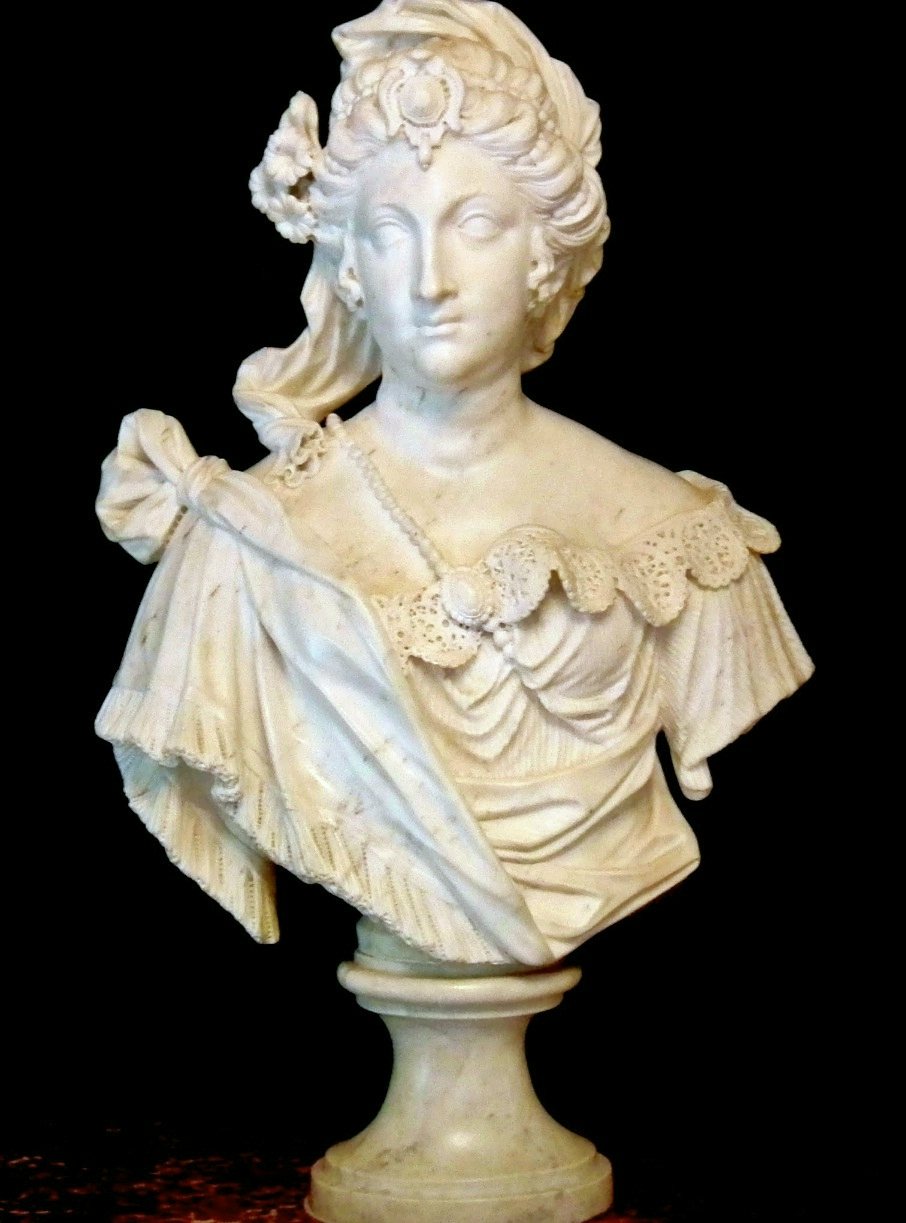
Prou's Bust of Marie Casimire Sobieska (c. 1680), Wilanów Palace in Warsaw.

Jacques Prou (1655–1706) was a French Academic Baroque sculptor, a product of the Academy system overseen by Charles Le Brun. Trained in the Academy school in Paris. he spent four years (1676–80) refining his style at the French Academy in Rome, then returned to Paris to become a member of the team of the Bâtiments du Roi from 1681, providing sculpture for Versailles in the atelier of Jean-Baptiste Tuby, whose daughter he married. He was received as a full member of the Académie royale de peinture et de sculpture in 1682, presenting as his reception piece a bas-relief of Sculpture consulting Painting over the portrait of Louis XIV, now at the Musée du Louvre, which reveals his concern for surface textures adapted from the dominant art, painting At Versailles he became closely associated in projects for fountains and emblematic decorative sculpture with Antoine Coysevox, notably in the Escalier des princes, the salon opening onto it, and the Salon de la Guerre.

For Versailles he carved a vase on the theme The Infant Mars, following a design from the office of Jules Hardouin-Mansart. His work for Marly, 1683–84 and 1705, has disappeared.

His marble memorial portrait bust of the recently deceased Philippe de France, duc d'Orléans, only brother of Louis XIV, was exhibited at the Paris Salon of 1704.
