= Mariano Ramón Sánchez =

Spanish painter (1740–1822)

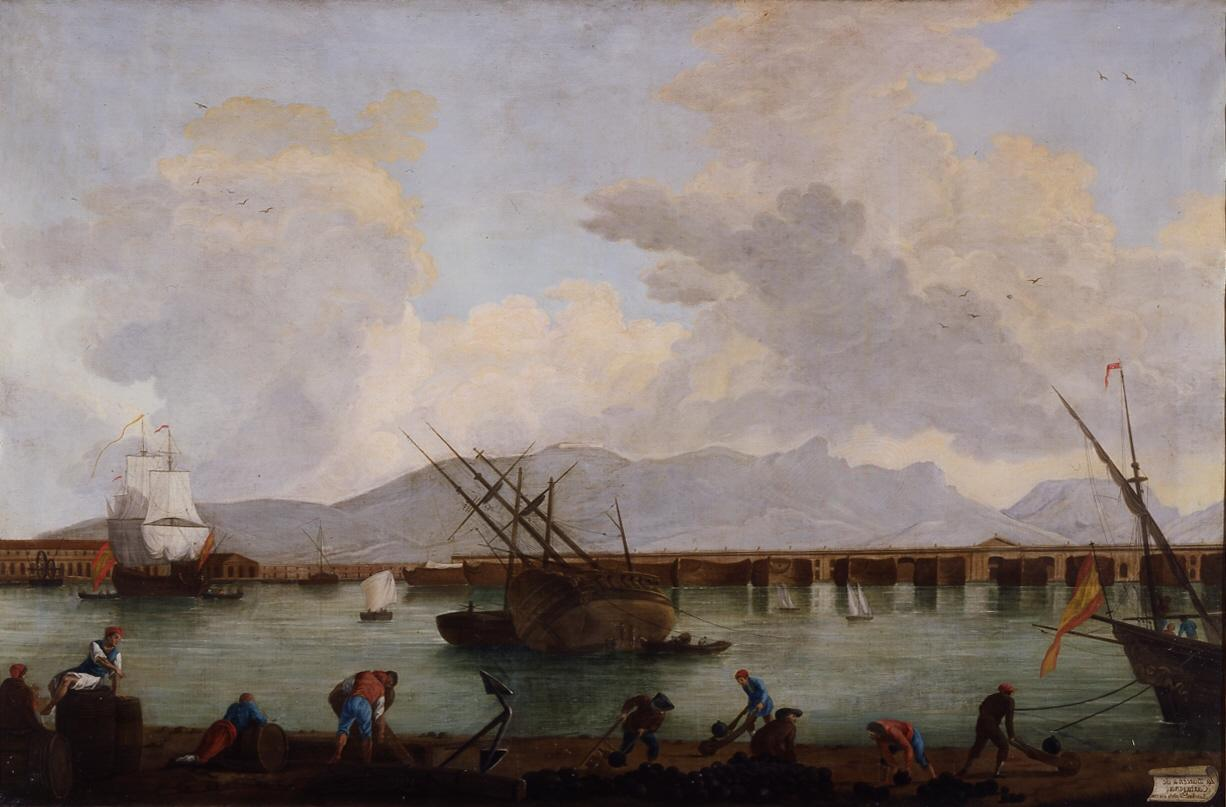
Dársena de Cartagena, óleo sobre lienzo, 73,50 x 112 cm, Madrid, Real Academia de Bellas Artes de San Fernando

Mariano Ramón Sánchez (1740–1822) was a Spanish painter.

Born in Valencia, Sánchez first began studies in Art in the Real Academia de Bellas Artes de San Fernando of Madrid, where he won prizes and was admitted as a supernumerary academic to teach miniaturists in 1781. He was commissioned by King Carlos III to paint over 120 vistas of various ports, arsenals and bays of Spain. King Carlos IV named him pintor de camara (chamber painter) in 1791.
