= 1729 in art =

Events from the year 1729 in art.

== Events ==
- Works of art from Rome arrive in Dresden, leading to the establishment of the Skulpturensammlung.
- Pierre-Jean Mariette authors the first volume of the Recueil Crozat, a collection of engravings after masterworks from French royal and aristocratic collections, published by the Imprimerie royale.

== Paintings ==
- William Hogarth paints Act III of The Beggar's Opera.
- William Kent – The Battle of Agincourt
- François Lemoyne paints Pygmalion Watching his Statue Come to Life.
- Antonio David paints portraits of Prince Charles Edward Stuart ("Bonnie Prince Charlie") and his brother Prince Henry.
- Nicolas de Largillière (Paris) paints a portrait of Elizabeth Throckmorton.
- Andreas Møller probably paints a portrait of the Archduchess Maria Theresa of Austria.
- A painter of the "Nasini circle" paints the Miracle of San Vincenzo Ferrer.

== Births ==
- January 5 – Paulus Constantijn la Fargue, Dutch painter, etcher and draftsman (died 1782)
- January 17 – Giovanni Antonio Zaddei, Italian painter of altarpieces, mainly active in Ferrara (died unknown)
- March 24 – Simon Mathurin Lantara, French landscape painter (died 1778)
- April 13 – Rienk Jelgerhuis, Dutch painter, engraver and draftsman (died 1806)
- May 7 – Pierre-Joseph Lion, Belgian painter (died 1809)

=== date unknown ===
- Joseph Antony Adolph, Moravian painter (died 1762)
- Jean-Baptiste Defernex, French sculptor especially of portrait busts (died 1783)
- Jean-Baptiste-Henri Deshays, French painter (died 1765)
- Vinzenz Fischer, Austrian historical painter and professor of architecture (died 1810)
- Saverio Gandini, Italian painter (died 1796)
- James MacArdell, Irish engraver of mezzotints (died 1765)
- Hughes Taraval, French painter (died 1785)

== Deaths ==
- January 21 – Marco Ricci, Italian veduta painter (born 1676)
- March 2 – Peter Van Dievoet, Belgian sculptor and designer of ornamental architectural features (born 1661)
- March 9 – Henrietta Johnston, early American pastellist (born 1670)
- April 26 – John Nost, Flemish sculptor especially utilizing lead (born unknown)
- August 22 – Torii Kiyonobu I, Japanese painter and printmaker in the ukiyo-e style, especially on Kabuki signboards (born 1664)
- October 2 - Arnold Boonen, Dutch portrait painter (born 1669)
- October 22 - Anna Maria Ehrenstrahl, Swedish painter of allegories, portraits and group portraits (born 1666)
- November 16 - Alessandro Specchi, Italian architect and engraver (born 1668)
- December 24 – Marcantonio Franceschini, Italian painter of religious and mythological subjects (born 1648)
- date unknown
  - Scipione Angelini, Italian painter of still-lifes (born 1661)
  - Panagiotis Doxaras, Greek painter who founded the Heptanese School of Greek art (born 1662)
  - Lorenzo Fratellini, Italian painter of miniature portraits (born 1690)
  - Cristóbal de León, Spanish painter of monastic portraits (born unknown)
  - Krzysztof Lubieniecki – Polish Baroque painter and engraver (born 1659)
