= 1809 in art =

Events in the year 1809 in Art.

== Events ==
- Six students of the Academy of Fine Arts Vienna form an artistic cooperative called the Brotherhood of St. Luke (Lukasbund), predecessor of the Nazarene movement.

== Works ==
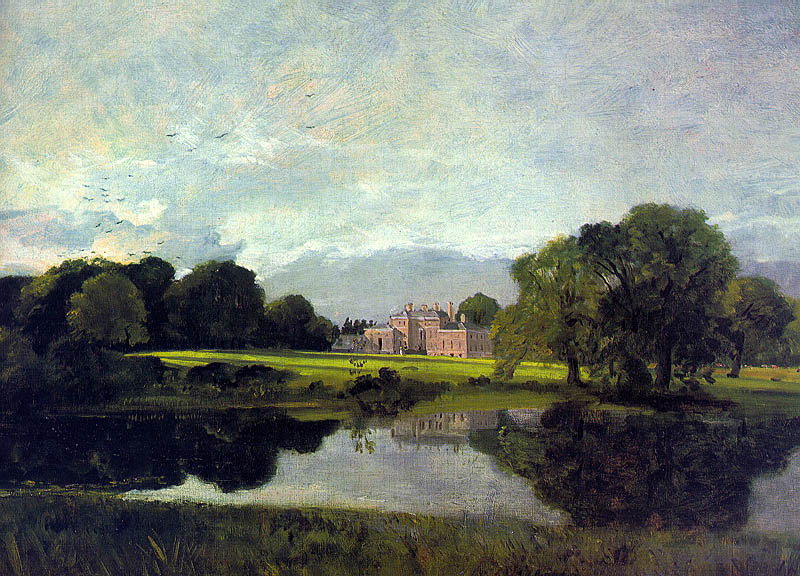
John Constable, Malvern Hall 1809

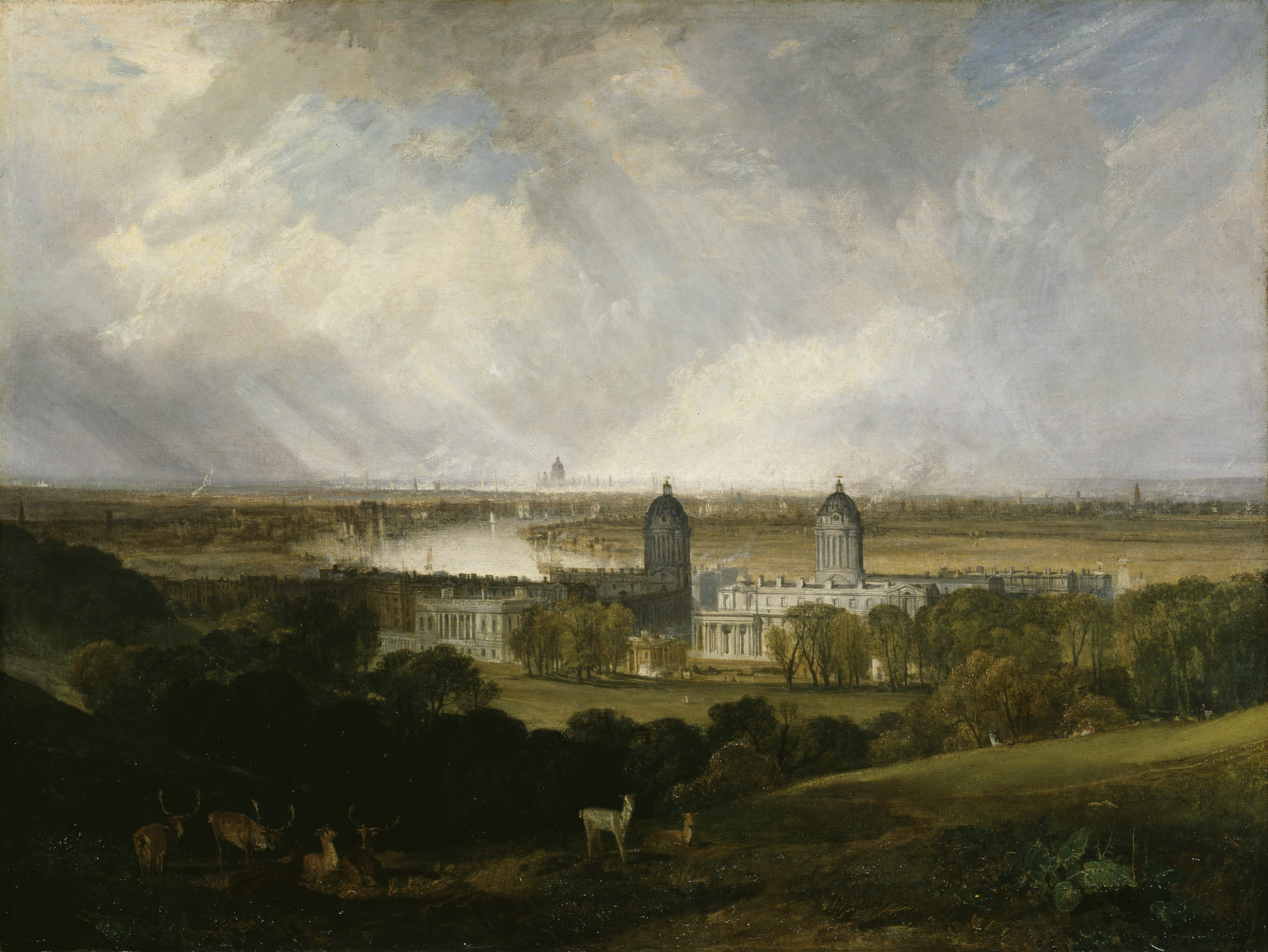
J. M. W. Turner,London from Greenwich Park, 1809

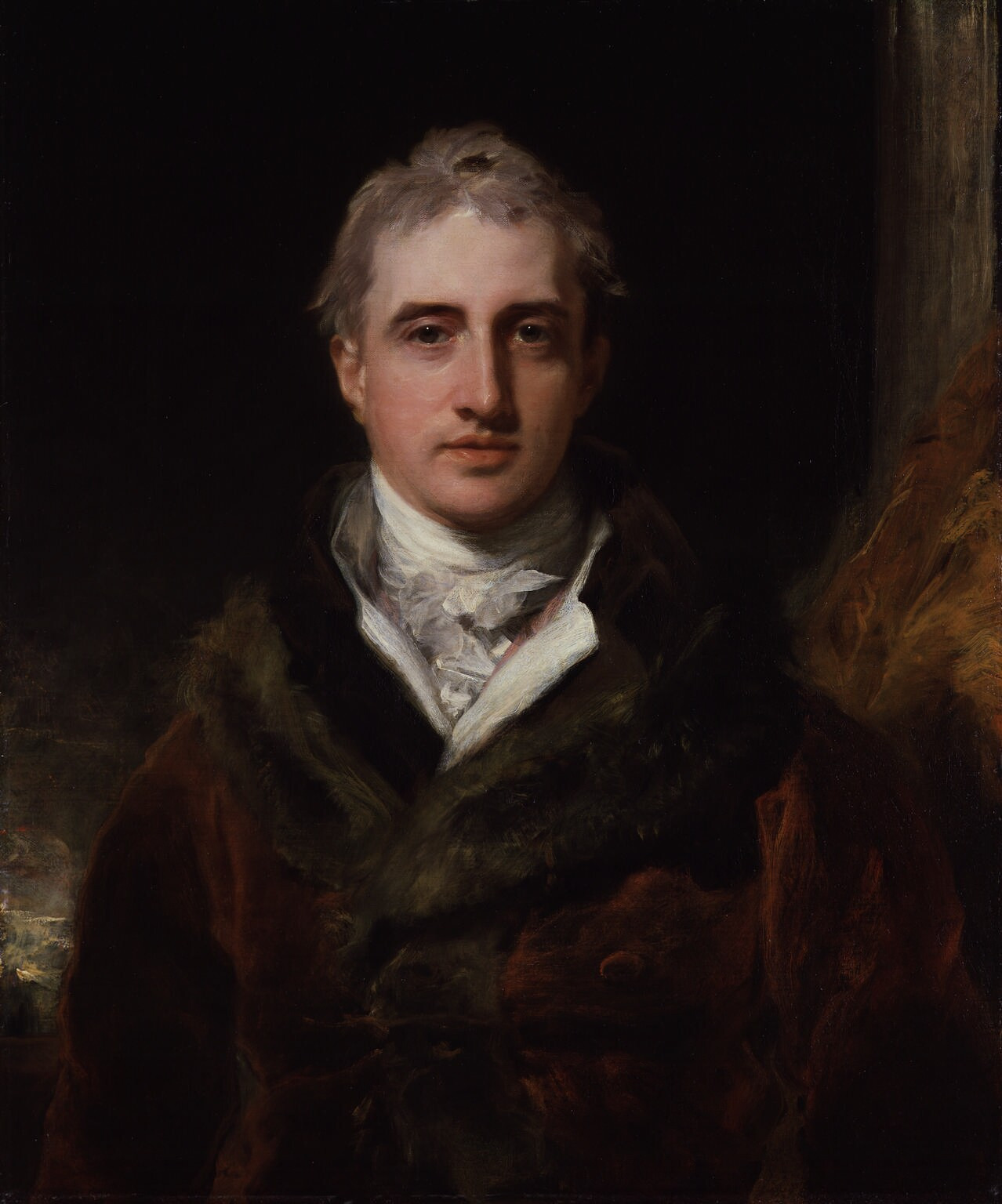
Thomas Lawrence, Lord Castlereagh, 1809

- Martin Archer Shee – Belisarius
- Pietro Benvenuti – Elisa Bonaparte surrounded by the artists of Florence
- John Constable – Malvern Hall
- John Singleton Copley – George, Prince of Wales, on horseback
- Jacques-Louis David – Sappho and Phaon
- George Dawe – Imogen Found in the Cave of Belarius
- Caspar David Friedrich – Mönch am Meer
- Anne-Louis Girodet de Roussy-Trioson – Portrait of Chateaubriand
- Thomas Douglas Guest
  - The Transfiguration
  - Venus recumbent and Cupids
- Charles Howard Hodges – Portrait of Louis Bonaparte
- Orest Kiprensky
  - Portrait of Countess Ye. P. Rostopchina
  - Portrait of Yevgraf Davydov
- Thomas Lawrence
  - Portrait of George III
  - Lord Castlereagh
- William Mulready – Returning from the Ale House
- Abraham Pether – Old Drury Lane Theatre on Fire
- Charles Willson Peale – The Peale Family
- Henry Raeburn – Mrs Spiers
- J. M. W. Turner
  - Fishing Upon the Blythe Sand
  - The Garreteer's Petition
  - Harvest Dinner, Kingston Bank
  - The Trout Stream
  - London from Greenwich Park
  - Ploughing Up Turnips, Near Slough
  - Sun Setting through Vapour
- Richard Westall – Nelson and the Bear
- Richard Westmacott – Statue of Horatio Nelson, Birmingham

== Births ==
- February 15 – Owen Jones, British architect, interior designer, and pioneer of chromolithography (died 1874)
- March 1 – Robert Cornelius, American pioneer of photography (died 1893)
- March 23 – Jean-Hippolyte Flandrin, French painter (died 1864)
- April 17 – Thomas Brigstocke, Welsh portrait painter (died 1881)
- May 5 – Frederick Langenheim, German American pioneer of panoramic photography (died 1879)
- May 20 – Albert Newsam, American artist (died 1864)
- August 28 – Giovanni Maria Benzoni, Italian sculptor (died 1873)
- October 9 – Thomas Baker "of Leamington", English landscape painter (died 1864)
- December 24 (bapt.) – Mary Thornycroft, English sculptor (died 1895)
- unknown date Mary Ellen Best, English watercolour artist (died 1891)

== Deaths ==
- January 3 – Henri-Pierre Danloux, French painter (born 1753)
- January 7 – Johann Peter Alexander Wagner, Rococo sculptor (born 1730)
- February 23 – Dirk van der Aa, Dutch painter (born 1731)
- March 7 – Pierre-Philippe Choffard, French draughtsman and engraver (born 1731)
- March 23 – Étienne Dantoine, French sculptor (born 1737)
- March 27 – Joseph-Marie Vien, French painter (born 1716)
- April 6 – Jean-Pierre Saint-Ours, Swiss painter (born 1752)
- May 8 – Augustin Pajou, French sculptor (born 1730)
- June 4 – Nikolaj Abraham Abildgaard, Danish Neoclassicist painter (born 1743)
- September 1 – Pierre-Joseph Lion, Belgian painter (born 1729)
- November 7 – Paul Sandby, map-maker turned landscape painter in watercolours (born 1731)
- November 11 – Jean-Joseph Taillasson, French painter (born 1745)
- date unknown
  - Immanuel Alm, Finnish painter of primarily religious-themed works (born 1767)
  - Jonathan Fisher, Irish painter (born unknown)
