= 1733 in art =

Events from the year 1733 in art.

== Events ==
- 5 March – William Hogarth sketches Sarah Malcolm, convicted of murder, in her condemned cell in London; from this he immediately publishes an engraving and makes a painting.

== Works ==
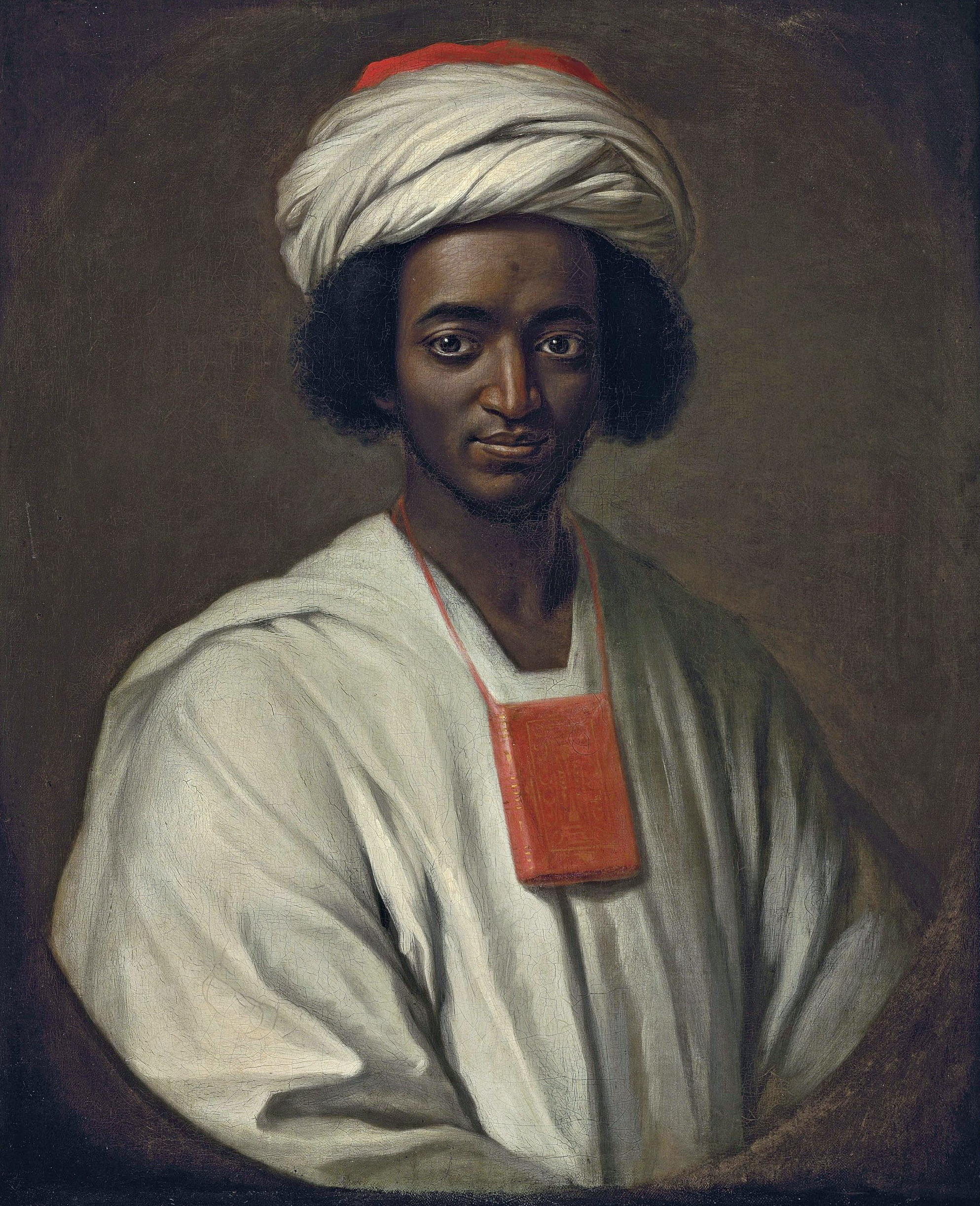
William Hoare's portrait of Ayuba Suleiman Diallo

- Pompeo Batoni – Madonna on a Throne with Child and four Saints and Blesseds of the Gabrielli family (San Gregorio Magno al Celio, Rome)
- William Hoare of Bath – Portrait of Ayuba Suleiman Diallo
- William Hogarth – Southwark Fair
- Philippe Mercier – The Music Party
- Sebastiano Ricci
  - Baldassarre and Ester before Ahasuerus (Quirinal Palace, Rome)
  - Pope Gregory the Great intercedes for souls in Purgatory (St-Gervais-et-St-Protais, Paris)
  - Pope Pius V, Saints Thomas Acquinus and Peter Martyr (Gesuati, Venice)
  - Saint Francisco resuscitates the child Paola (San Rocco, Venice)
  - Saint Helen discovers the True Cross (San Rocco, Venice)

== Births ==
- January 8 – Anton von Maron, Austrian painter active in Rome (died 1808)
- January 18 – Samuel Hieronymus Grimm, Swiss watercolour painter (died 1794)
- March 13 – Johann Zoffany, German neoclassical painter (died 1810)
- March 23 – Josiah Spode, English potter (died 1797)
- May – Franz Edmund Weirotter, Austrian landscape painter (died 1771)
- May 21 – Johanna Juliana Friederike Bacciarelli, German painter (died 1809 or later)
- May 22 – Hubert Robert, French painter (died 1808)
- June 12
  - Alessandro Longhi, Venetian portrait painter and printmaker in etching (died 1813)
  - Maruyama Ōkyo, Japanese painter (died 1795)
- October 5 – Louis Jean-Jacques Durameau, French painter and winner of the Grand prix de Rome (died 1796)
- October 30 – Sawrey Gilpin, English painter of animals (died 1807)
- date unknown
  - Jean-Baptiste Claudot, French painter of landscapes, flowers and still-life (died 1805)
  - Luo Ping, Chinese Qing dynasty painter, one of the Eight Eccentrics of Yangzhou (died 1799)
  - Franciszek Pinck, Polish sculptor and stucco artist (died 1798)
  - Anna Brita Sergel, textile artist of the royal Swedish court (died 1819)

== Deaths ==
- January 18 – Simon Gribelin, French line engraver (born 1661)
- February 28 – Ignaz Waibl, Austrian woodcarver (born 1661)
- April 15 - Englebert Fisen, Flemish painter (born 1655)
- May 1 – Nicolas Coustou, French sculptor (born 1658)
- May 8 – Bernard Picart, French engraver (born 1673)
- July – Jan van Huchtenburg, Dutch painter (born 1647)
- August 24 – Pierre-Étienne Monnot, French sculptor (born 1657)
- November 2 – Louis de Boullogne, French painter and brother of Bon Boullogne (born 1657)
- December 2 – Gerard Hoet, Dutch Golden Age painter (born 1648)
- date unknown
  - Nicolas Fouché, French painter (born 1653)
  - Alexis Grimou, French painter (born 1678)
  - Gaetano Martoriello, Italian painter of marine vedute and landscapes (born 1680)
  - Giacomo Parolini, Italian painter of altarpieces (born 1663)
  - Thomas van der Wilt, Dutch painter (born 1659)
