= 1661 in art =

Events from the year 1661 in art.

== Events ==
- April 19 - Philip IV of Spain appoints Juan Bautista Martínez del Mazo to succeed his late father-in-law Diego Velázquez as court painter (Pintor de cámara) in Madrid.
- October - The newly-restored King Charles II of England appoints Peter Lely as court painter.

== Paintings ==
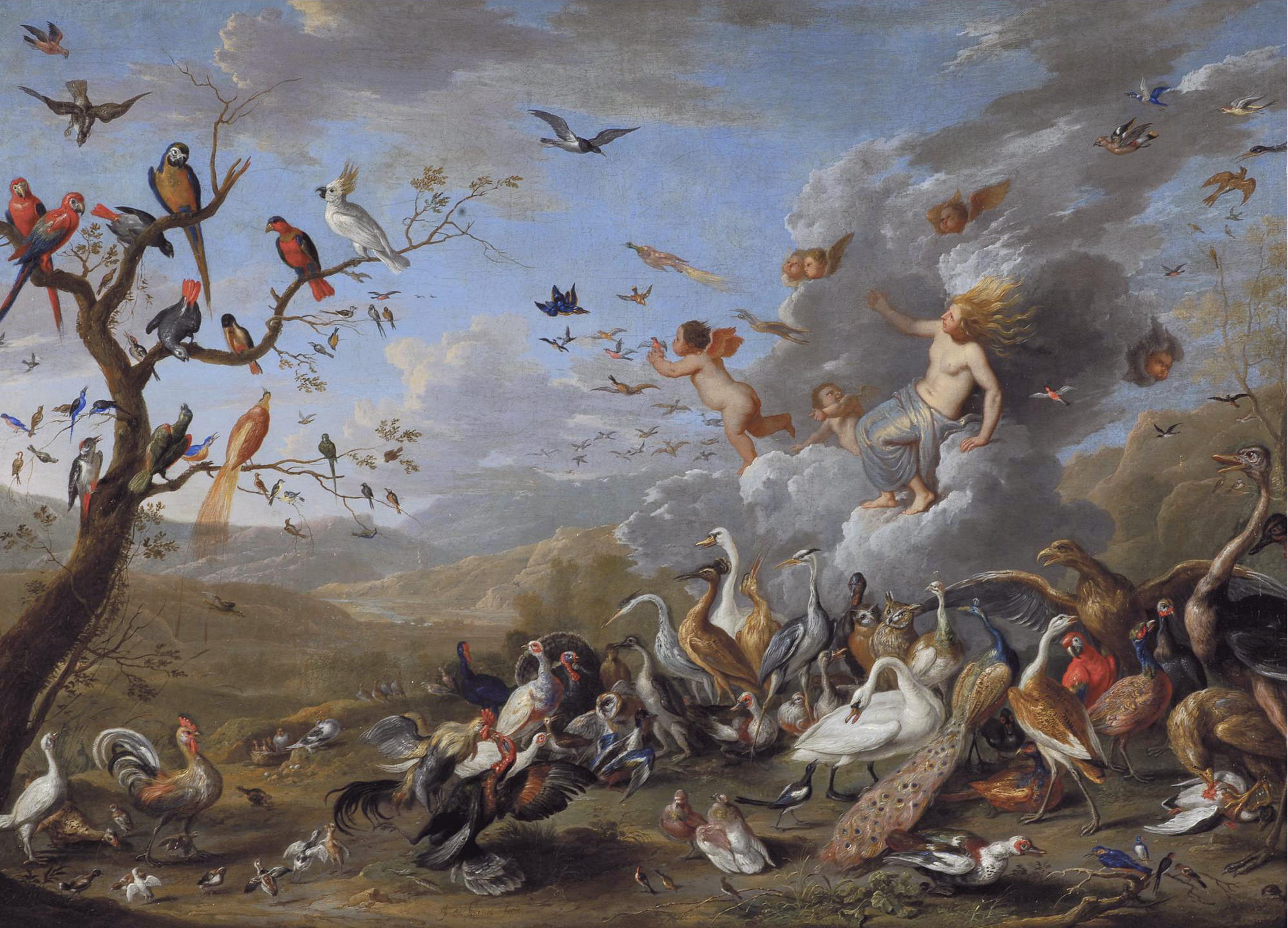
van Kessel – Allegory of Air

- Filippo Abbiati - Coriolanus Persuaded By His Family To Raise the Siege of Rome
- Gerrit Dou - Old Lady with a Candle
- Gabriël Metsu
  - Lovers at Breakfast
  - The Visit to the Nursery, after the birth of Sara Hinlopen (1660)
- Reinier Nooms - Ships on the IJ at Amsterdam
- Rembrandt
  - Saint Matthew and the Angel
  - Saint James The Elder
- Jan van Kessel, senior - Allegory of Air
- Jan Vermeer - View of Delft
- John Michael Wright - Charles II in Coronation Robes

== Births ==
- February 24 - Alexandre-François Desportes, French painter and decorative designer who specialised in animal works (died 1743)
- March - Lucas de Valdés, Spanish painter and engraver (died 1724)
- April 6 - Stefano Maria Legnani, Italian painter, active mainly in Milan (died 1713)
- April 11 - Antoine Coypel, French painter (died 1722)
- June 1 - Gaspard Rigaud, French painter and portraitist (died 1705)
- June 29 - Peter Van Dievoet, Belgian sculptor and designer of ornamental architectural features (died 1729)
- date unknown
  - Scipione Angelini, Italian painter best known for still lifes (died 1729)
  - Benoît Audran the Elder, French engraver (died 1721)
  - Nunzio Ferraiuoli, Italian painter (died 1735)
  - Giacinto Garofalini, Italian painter (died 1723)
  - Claude Charles, French historical and decorative painter (died 1747)
  - Simon Gribelin, French line engraver (died 1733)
  - Jacob Leyssens, Flemish painter and decorator from the Baroque (died 1710)
  - Domenico Maria Muratori, Bolognese (Italian) painter (died 1744)
  - Thomas Quellinus, Flemish sculptor (died 1709)
  - Ezaias Terwesten, Dutch painter (died 1724)
  - Ignaz Waibl, Austrian woodcarver (died 1733)
- probable - Alida Withoos, Dutch botanical artist and painter (died 1730)

== Deaths ==
- January 29 - Bartolomeo Gennari, Italian Renaissance painter (born 1594)
- March 23 - Pieter de Molijn, Dutch Golden Age painter and engraver born in England (born 1595)
- March 25 - Jan van Aken, Dutch Golden Age painter and engraver (born 1614)
- May 14 - Ilario Casolano, Italian painter (born 1588)
- June 21 - Andrea Sacchi, Italian painter of High Baroque Classicism (born 1599)
- August - Gerard Houckgeest, Dutch Delft School painter (born 1600)
- August 5 (bur.) - Cornelis Janssens van Ceulen, Dutch portrait painter (born 1593)
- September 11 - Jan Fyt, Flemish animal painter and etcher (born 1611)
- September 16 (bur.) – Cornelis Vroom, Dutch painter (born 1591), known for landscapes and seascapes, son of reverse-named Hendrick Cornelisz Vroom (1566–1640)
- October 25 - Lucas de Wael, Flemish painter active mainly in Genoa (born 1591)
- October 28 - Ottavio Amigoni, Italian painter, active in Brescia (born 1606)
- November 2 - Daniel Seghers, Flemish Jesuit brother and painter who specialized in flower still lifes (born 1590)
- November 11 - David Ryckaert III, Flemish painter, member of the Ryckaert family of artists (born 1612)
- date unknown
  - Willem Outgertsz Akersloot, Dutch Golden Age engraver (born 1600)
  - Cecco Bravo, Florentine painter of the Baroque period (born 1601)
  - Francesco Curradi, Italian painter of the style described as Counter-Maniera or Counter-Mannerism (born 1570)
  - Simon Luttichuys, Dutch painter (born 1610)
  - Flaminio Torre, Italian Baroque painter of churches in Bologna (born 1620)
  - Jan Gerritsz van Bronckhorst, Dutch painter and engraver (born 1603)
- probable
  - Frederik Bouttats, Flemish engraver (born 1620)
  - Jacob Peter Gowy, Flemish painter of The Flight of Icarus (born 1615)
  - Anton Francesco Lucini, Italian engraver and printmaker (born 1610)
  - Anthonie Jansz. van der Croos, Dutch painter (born 1606)
