= 1591 in art =

Events from the year 1591 in art.

== Events ==
- Antiveduto Grammatica leaves the studio of Giovanni Domenico Angelini to set up as an independent artist.
- William Scrots' anamorphic portrait of King Edward VI (nearly four decades dead at the time) causes a sensation when it is exhibited at Whitehall Palace.

== Works ==
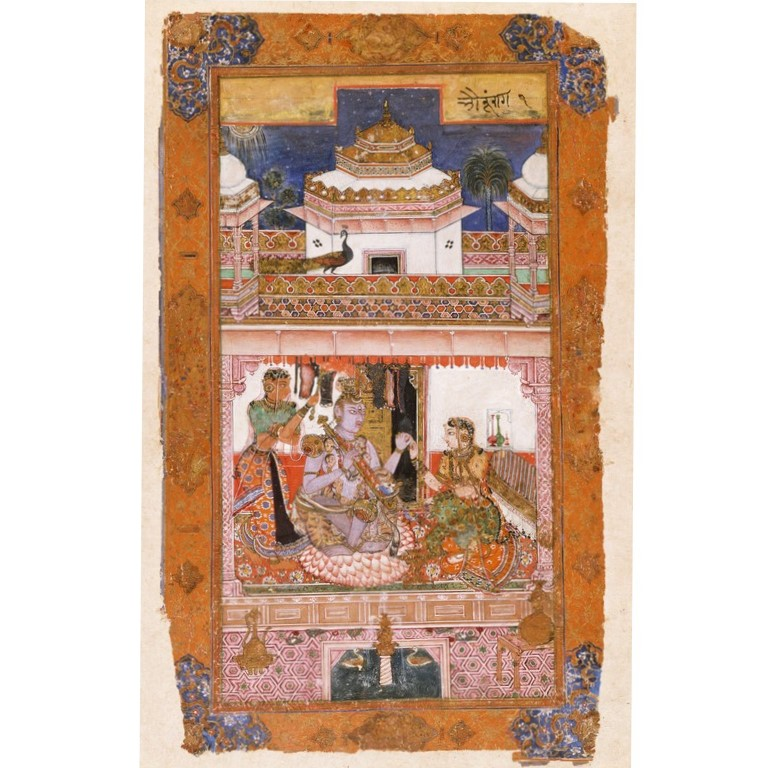
by pupils of Mir Sayyid 'Ali – Bhairava raga, Ragamala, Chunar, Opaque watercolour on paper, Victoria and Albert Museum

- Giuseppe Arcimboldo - Vertumnus (c.1590–91)
- Abraham Bloemaert - Niobe
- Marcus Gheeraerts the Younger - Sir Francis Drake wearing the Drake jewel

== Births ==
- January 12 - Jusepe de Ribera, Spanish Tenebrist painter and printmaker (died 1652)
- February 8 - Giovanni Francesco Barbieri (Guercino)), Italian painter (died 1666)
- March 19 - Dirck Hals, Dutch painter of festivals and ballroom scenes (died 1656)
- date unknown
  - Lucas de Wael, Flemish painter active mainly in Genoa (died 1631)
  - Jacques Fouquier, Flemish landscape painter (died 1659)
  - Giovanni Antonio Lelli, Italian painter of the Baroque period (died 1640)
  - Bartlomiej Strobel, painter (died 1650)
  - Cornelis Vroom, Dutch painter (died 1661), known for landscapes and seascapes, son of reverse-named Hendrick Cornelisz Vroom (1566–1640)
- probable
  - Willem Pieterszoon Buytewech, Dutch painter (died 1624)
  - Valentin de Boulogne, French painter (died 1632)

== Deaths ==
- March 17 - Jost Amman, Swiss illustrator (born 1539)
- May 3 - Antonio Abondio, Italian sculptor, best known as a medallist and as the pioneer of the coloured wax relief portrait miniature (born 1538)
- October 3 - Vincenzo Campi, Italian painter (born 1536)
- November 30 (possible date) - Johan Gregor van der Schardt, Dutch-born sculptor working in Denmark (born c.1530/31)
- date unknown
  - Bernardino Campi, Italian Renaissance painter (born 1522)
  - Giovanni Battista Naldini, Italian late-Mannerist painter in Florence (born 1537)
- probable - Crispin van den Broeck, Flemish painter (born 1523)
