= Sarah Malcolm =

British murderer, 18th century

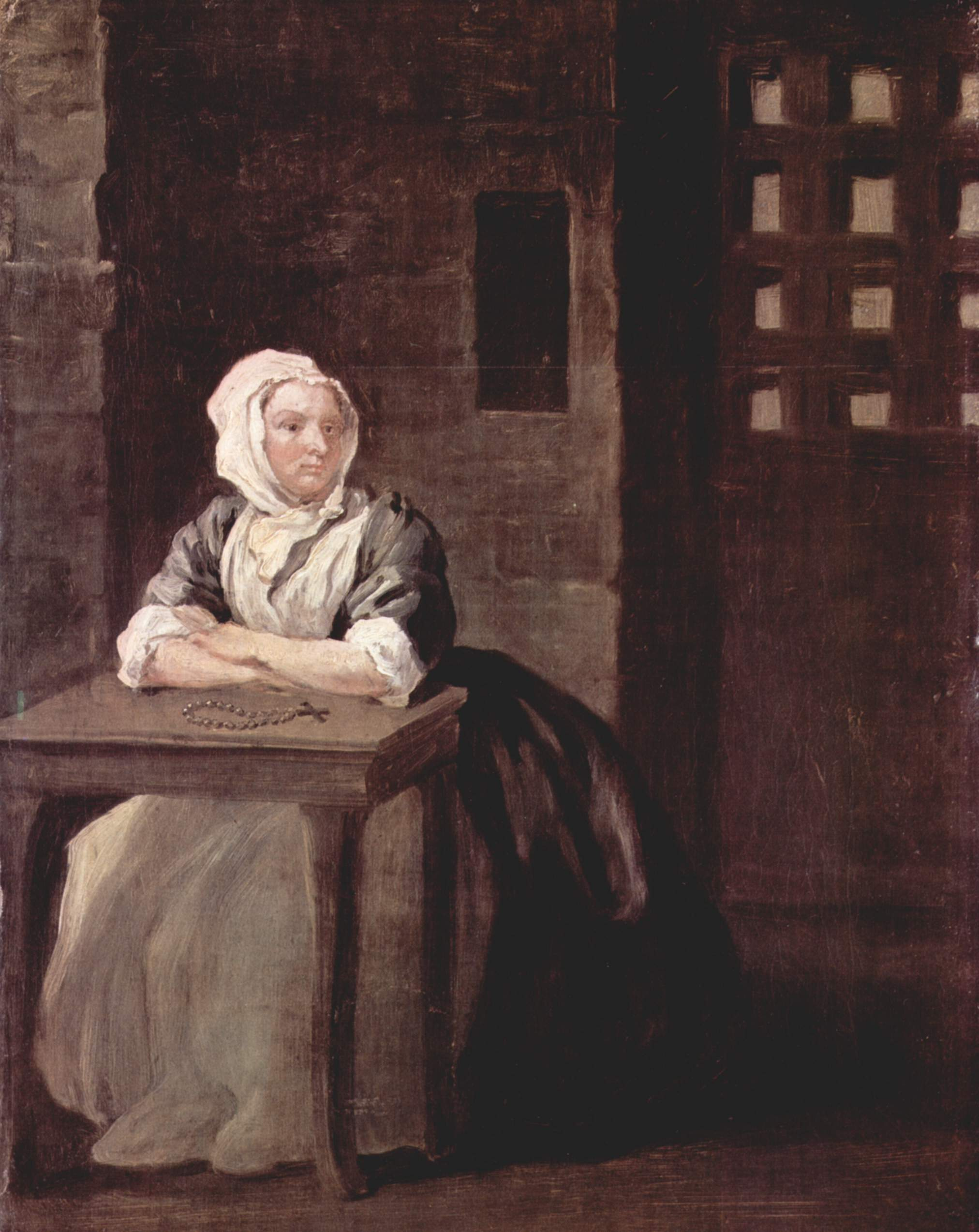
- Hogarth's sketch
- Born: c. 1711; Durham, Great Britain
- Died: Early March 1733 (Aged 22); London, Great Britain
- Cause of death: Hanged
- Occupation: Laundress
- Known for: Killing three women

Sarah Malcolm (c. 1711 – early March 1733) was a British mass murderer who was sketched by William Hogarth as she awaited execution for a triple murder charge.

== Life ==
Malcolm came from an Anglo–Irish family in County Durham, where she was born in 1711. She was raised in Dublin. As an adult, she came to London and found work in the domestic services sector, working as a laundress for residents above the Inns of the Court. She came to know an old lady named Lydia Duncomb (aged about 80). Duncomb lived with two maids: Elizabeth Harrison (aged about 60), who was infirm; and Ann Price (aged about 17). In February 1733 the three women were found murdered and their apartment burgled, and Malcolm was brought in for questioning.

Malcolm confessed to being involved in the robbery (which was already a capital crime in itself), but said that she was part of a group of four in total. If she could have implicated the other three for the murders then she might still have escaped a death sentence, but the investigators were not convinced. The key evidence was that her clothing had blood stains (Malcolm claimed this was simply her own menstrual blood rather than the blood of the victims) and that 45 guineas were found hidden in her hair.

During the trial she defended herself but was unsuccessful. Malcolm was sentenced to be hanged after the jury took only 15 minutes to decide her guilt. Still denying her part in the killings, she was hanged at Tyburn in London in early March 1733. The artist William Hogarth had visited her in Newgate Prison a few days before she was executed to sketch a portrait of her, which heightened her infamy after her death. He later arranged for both an engraving and an oil painting to be made of her. Hogarth was not alone in exploiting her notoriety as other people would visit to see if they could gain a confession that they could publish to further their reputations.

Sarah Malcolm in The Chronicles of Newgate by Arthur Griffiths

Her notoriety increased over time: in the nineteenth century, a sensationalistic account by military historian, author, and prison administrator Arthur Griffiths would describe Malcolm as an "unsexed desparado" whose crimes were of "particular atrocity even in those bloodthirsty times". In contrast, at least one twenty-first-century scholar considers her defence "convincing" and "at least worthy of consideration".
