= Johan Tobias Sergel =

Swedish sculptor (1740–1814)

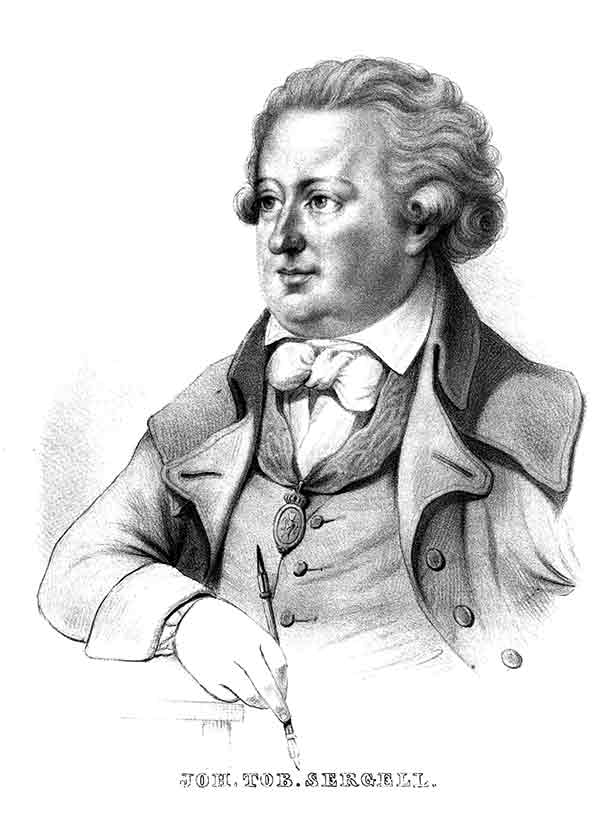
- Johan Tobias Sergel. Lithograph by Alexander Clemens Wetterling, 1849
- Born: Johan Tobias Sergel; 7 September 1740; Stockholm, Sweden
- Died: 26 February 1814 (aged 73); Stockholm

Johan Tobias Sergel (Swedish pronunciation: [ˈsæ̌rɡɛl]; 7 September 1740 – 26 February 1814) was a Swedish neoclassical sculptor. Sergels torg, the largest square in the centre of Stockholm and near where his workshop stood, is named after him.

== Life ==
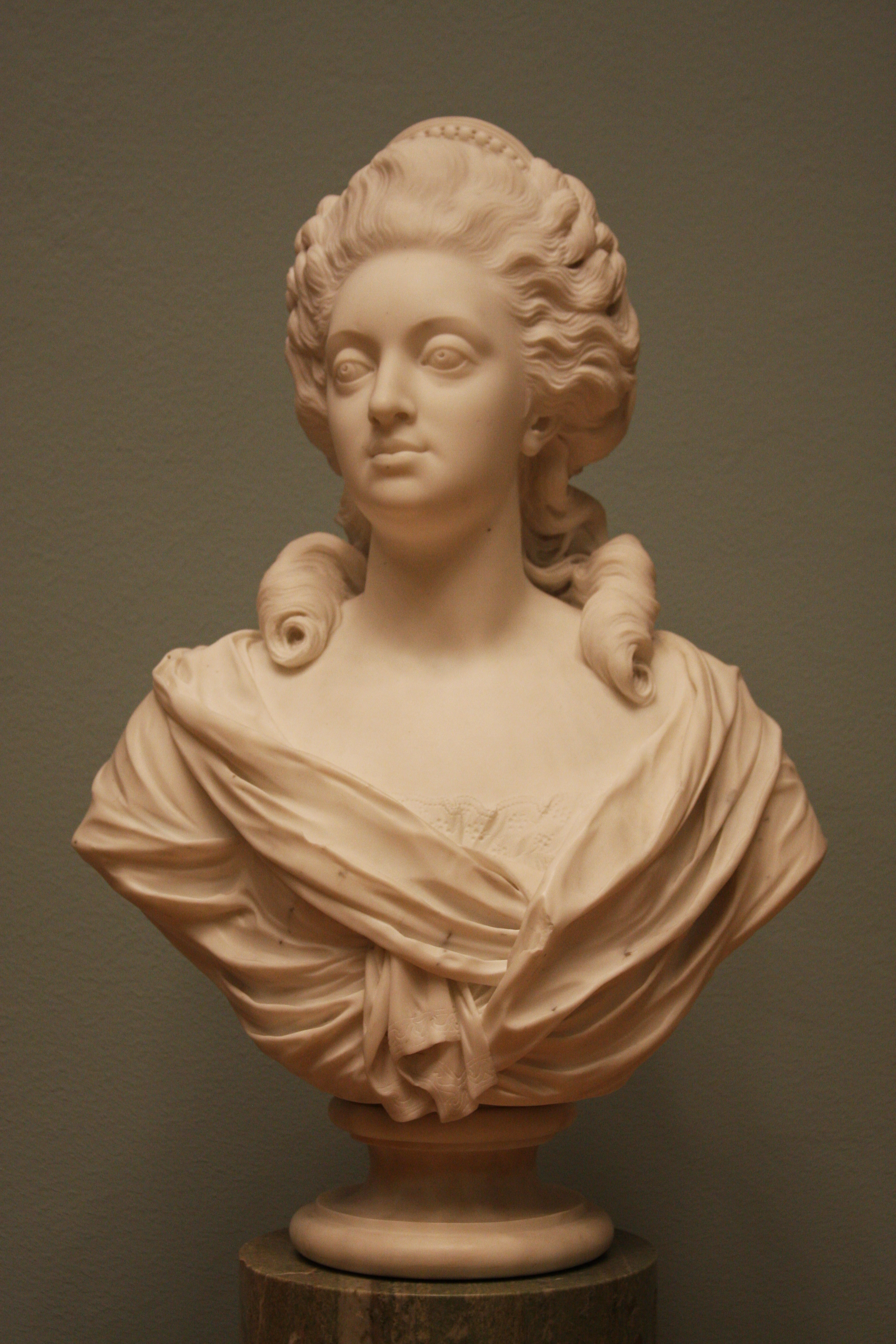
Sergel's bust of queen Sophia Magdalena of Denmark, 1783

Johan Tobias Sergel was born and died in Stockholm. He was the son of the decorator, Christoffer Sergel and Elisabet (née Swyrner), and was the brother of the decorator, Anna Brita Sergel. His first teacher was Pierre Hubert Larchevêsque. After studying in Paris, he went to Rome, where he moved in the same circles as the painters Alexander Runciman and James Barry. He stayed in Rome for twelve years and sculpted a number of groups in marble. Besides subjects from classical mythology such as the Diomedes Stealing the Palladium, which he sold to the British collector, Thomas Mansel Talbot, in 1772, he also sculpted a colossal representation of The Muse of History Recording the Deeds of Gustavus Adolphus, in which are depicted the achievements of King Gustav II Adolf before the Chancellor, Axel Oxenstierna. It was in Rome also that he modelled the statue of King Gustav III, subsequently cast in bronze and purchased by the city of Stockholm in 1796. While primarily a sculptor, Sergel (inspired by English artists like Thomas Rowlandson) also drew sequential picture stories, an early form of comic strip.

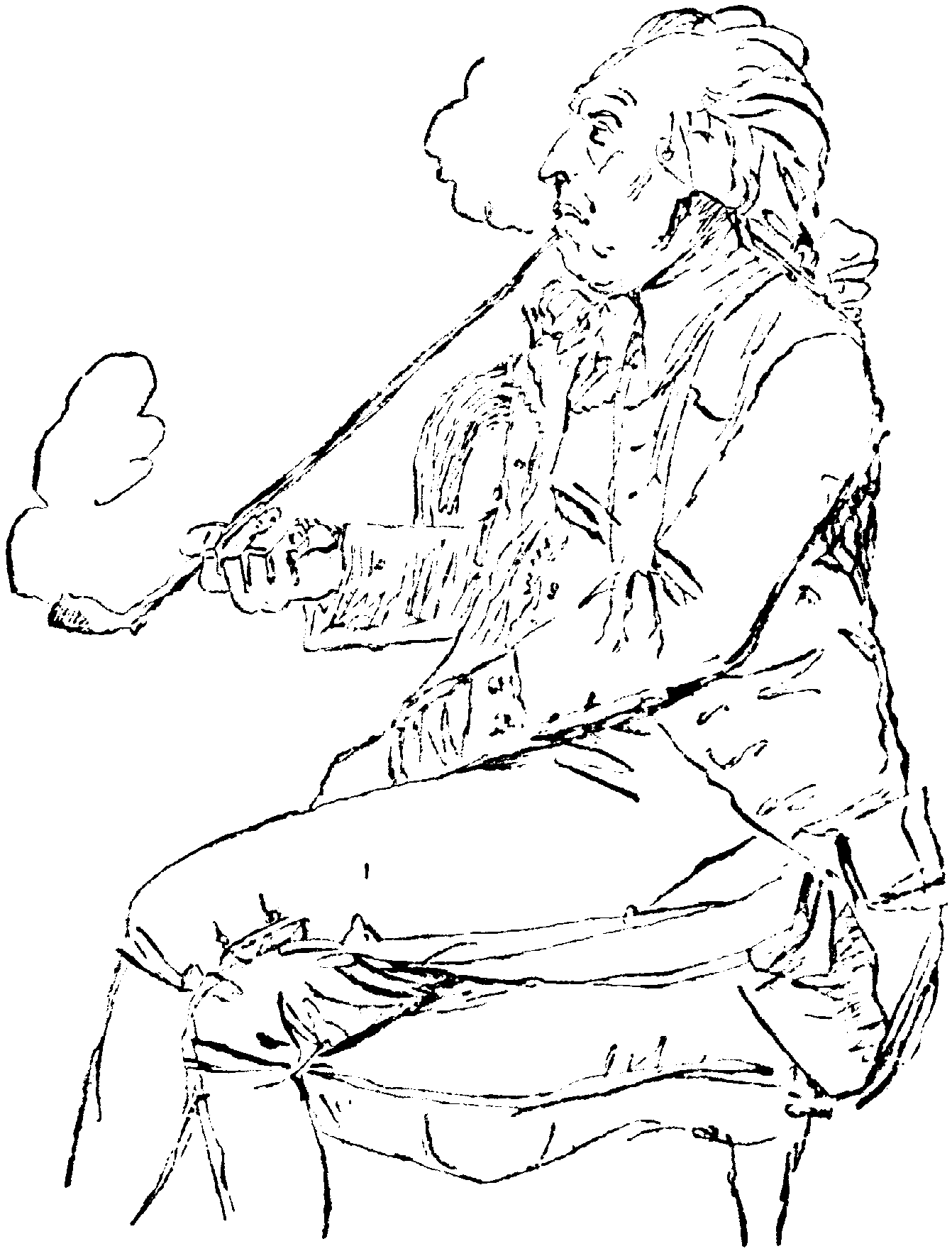
Portrait of the songwriter and performer Carl Michael Bellman, 1792

Summoned by Gustav III, Sergel returned to Stockholm in 1779 and continued to work there. Among the monuments he created at this time are a tomb for Gustav Vasa, a monument to Descartes, and a large relief in the church of St. Clarens, representing the Resurrection. He was an important part of the artistic elite in Stockholm, drawing a portrait of Sweden's bard Carl Michael Bellman among others. He had a relationship with the celebrated actress Fredrique Löwen and was possibly the father of one of her children. He died in his native city on 26 February 1814.

== Works ==
Among his works in the Nationalmuseum in Blasieholmen, central Stockholm are his monumental sculptures "Diomedes Stealing the Palladium", "The Muse of History Recording the Deeds of Gustavus Adolphus", and a "Bust of Gustavus III".

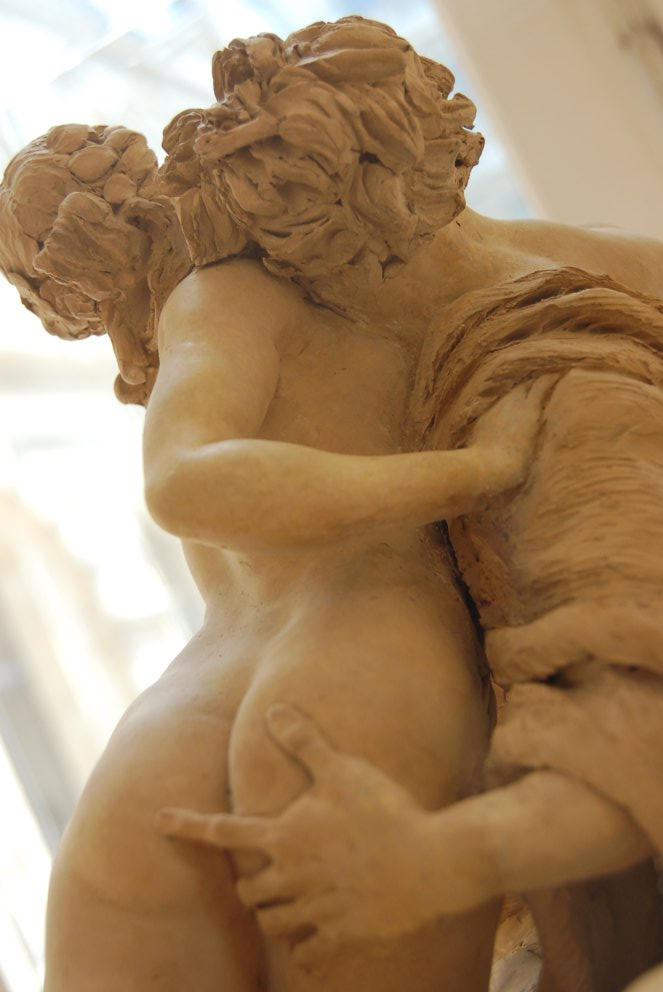
Centaur embracing a bacchante, terracotta, 1775–1778

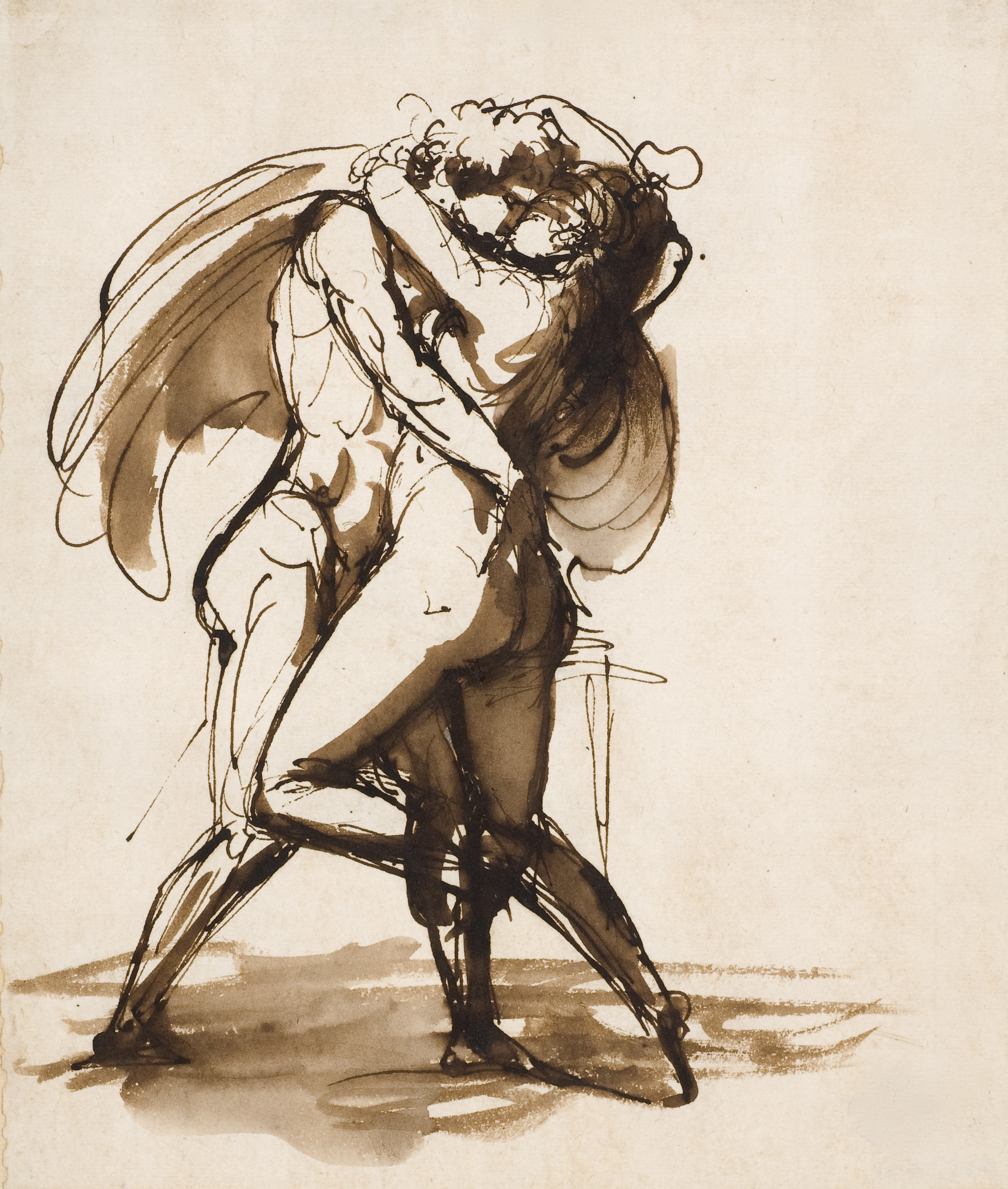
Passionate couple, wash drawing, n.d.

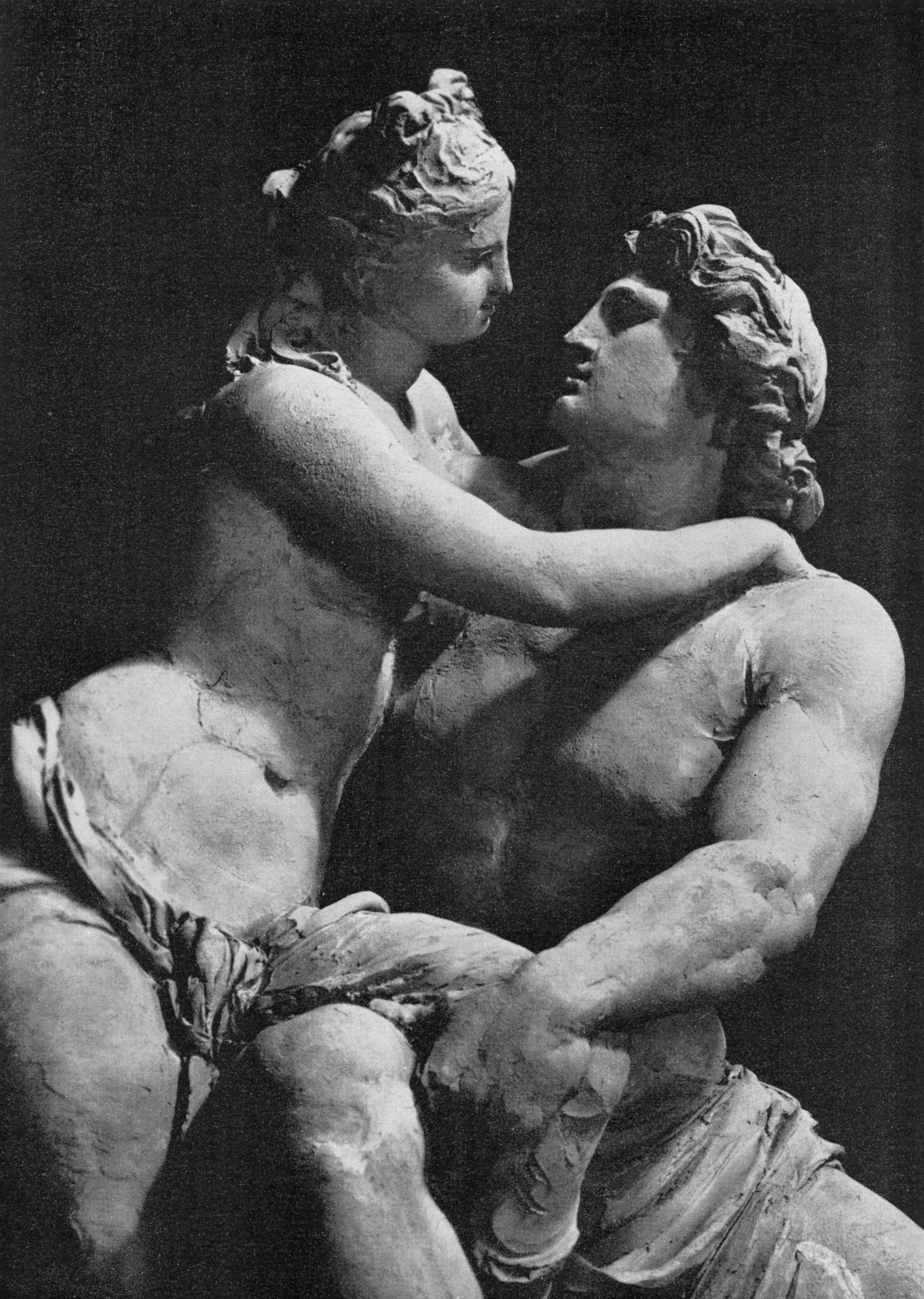
Venus and Anchises, n.d.

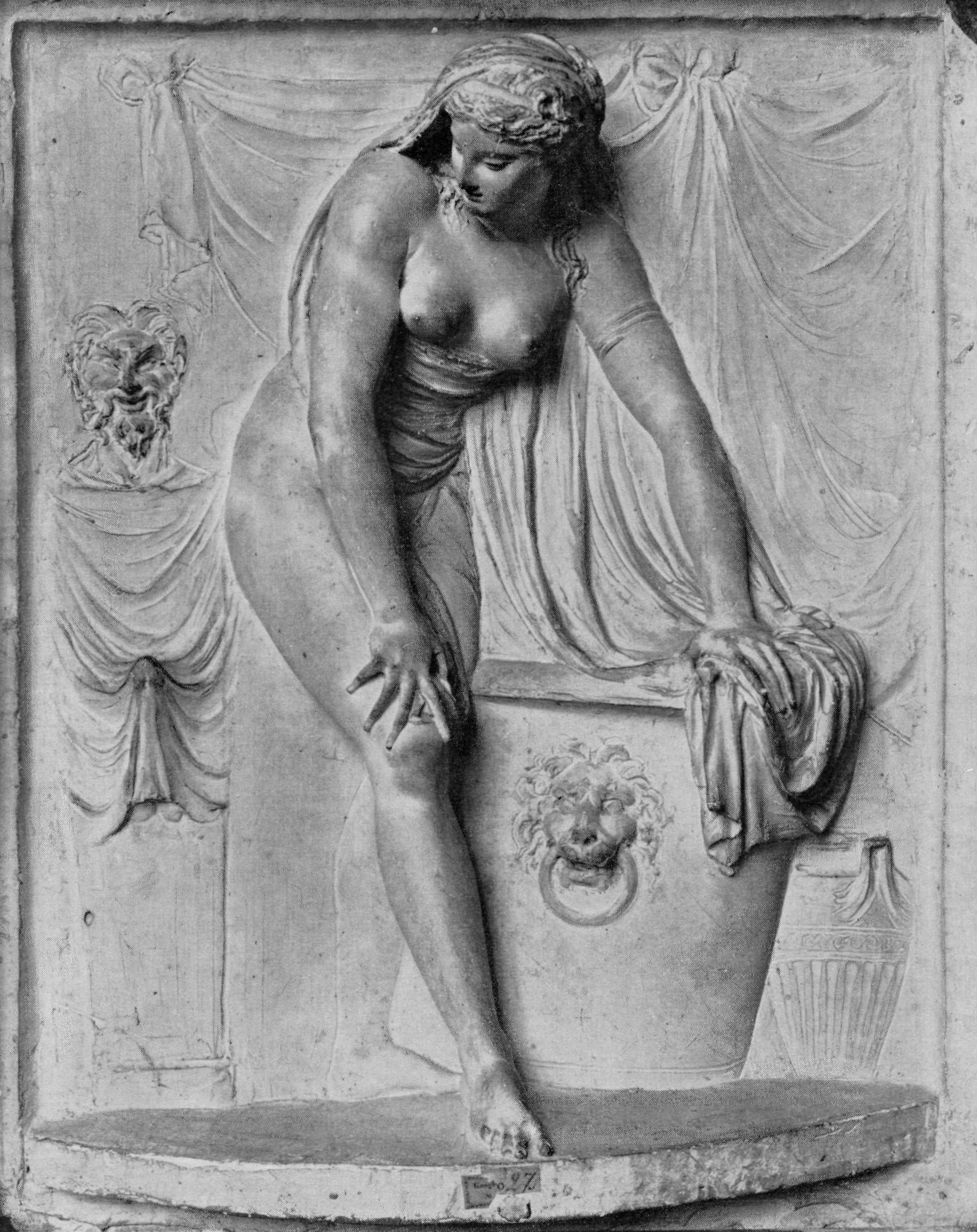
Woman climbing out of bath, plaster relief, n.d.

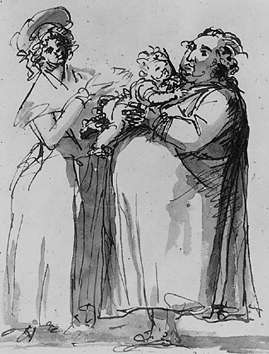
Self-portrait with his common-law wife Anna-Rella Hellström and their son Gustav, wash drawing, 1793

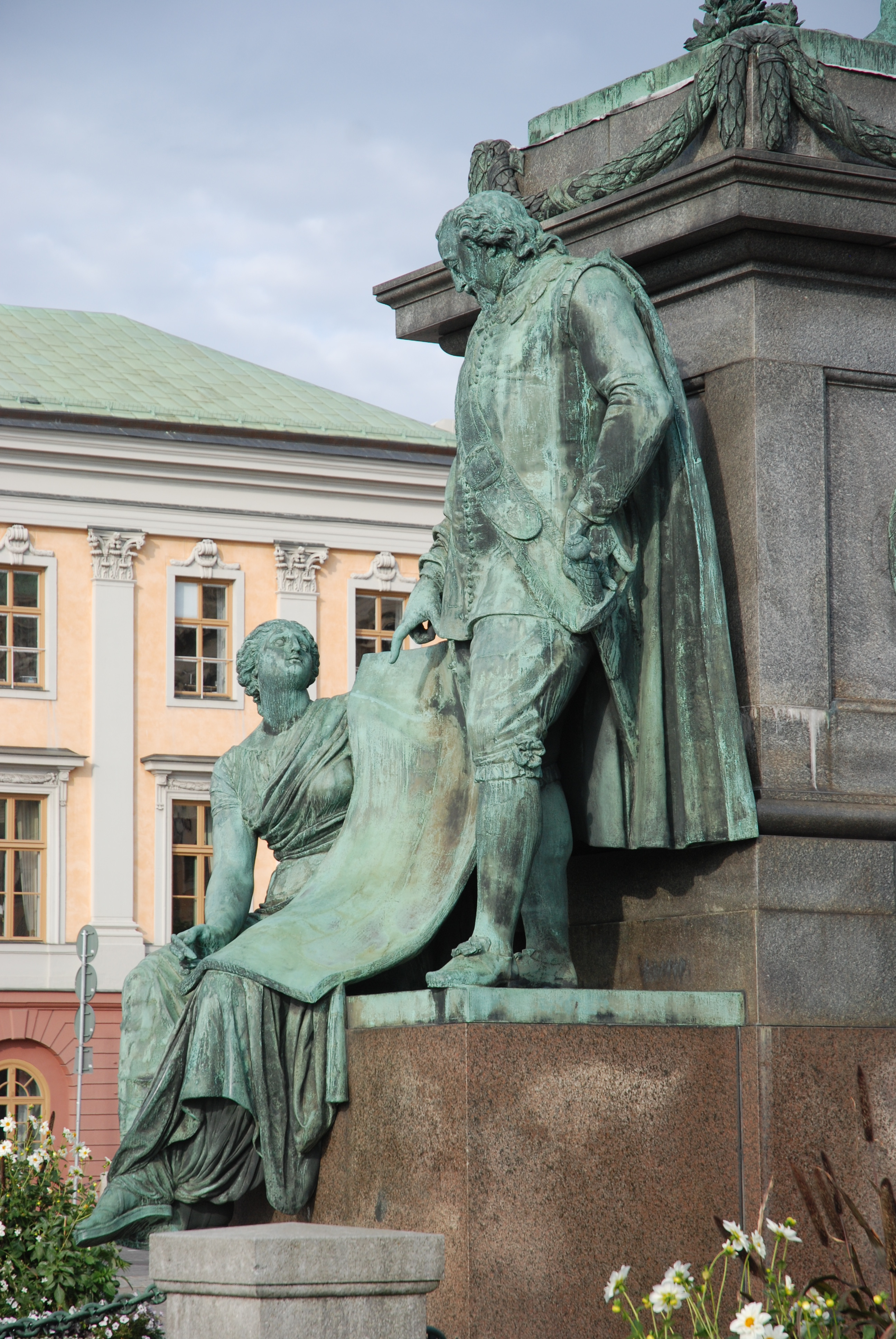
Sculpture of Axel Oxenstierna, on the south side of the postament of the Gustav II Adolf monument in Stockholm, bronze, 1796

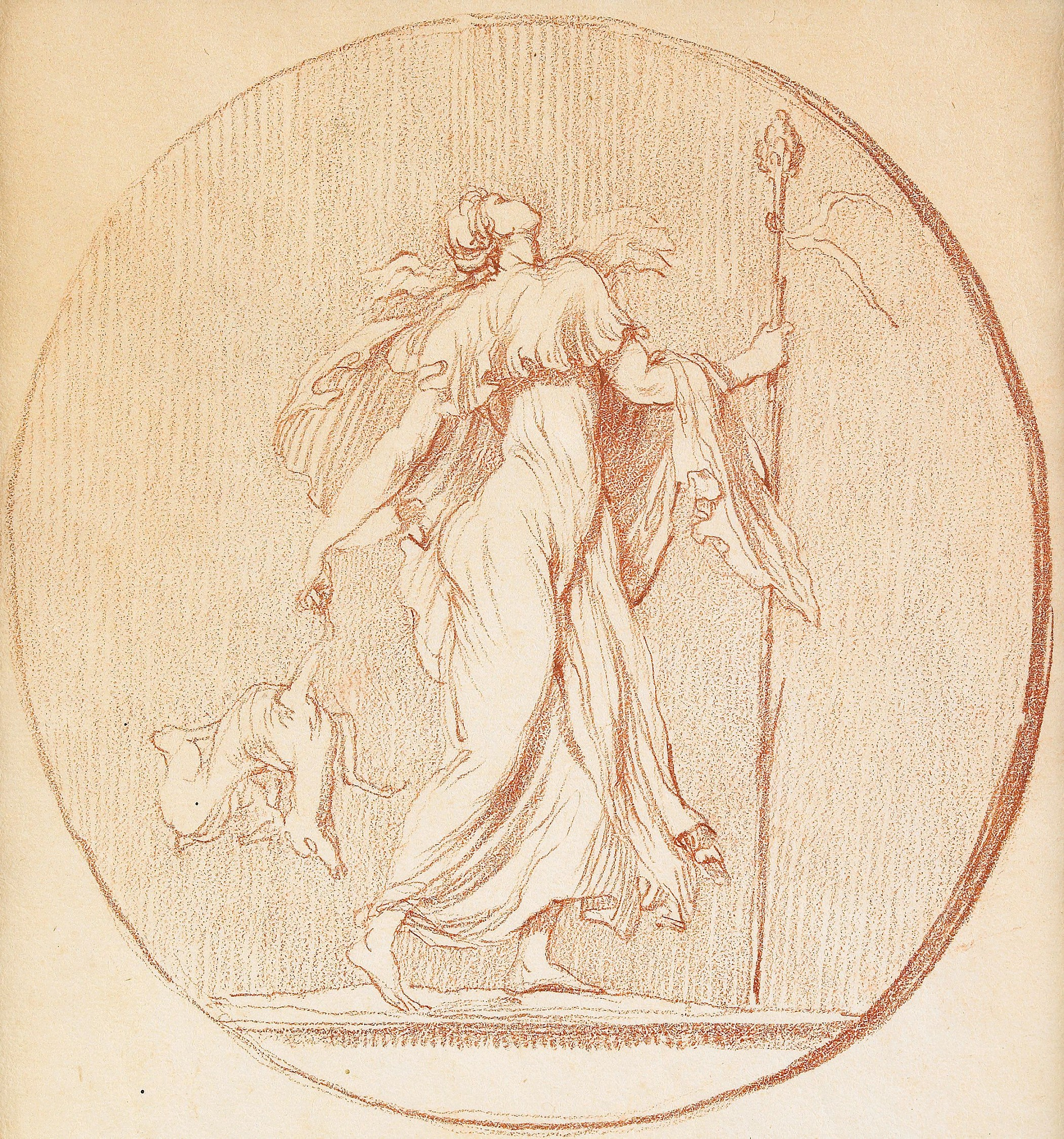
Dancing bacchante, crayon on paper, n.d.

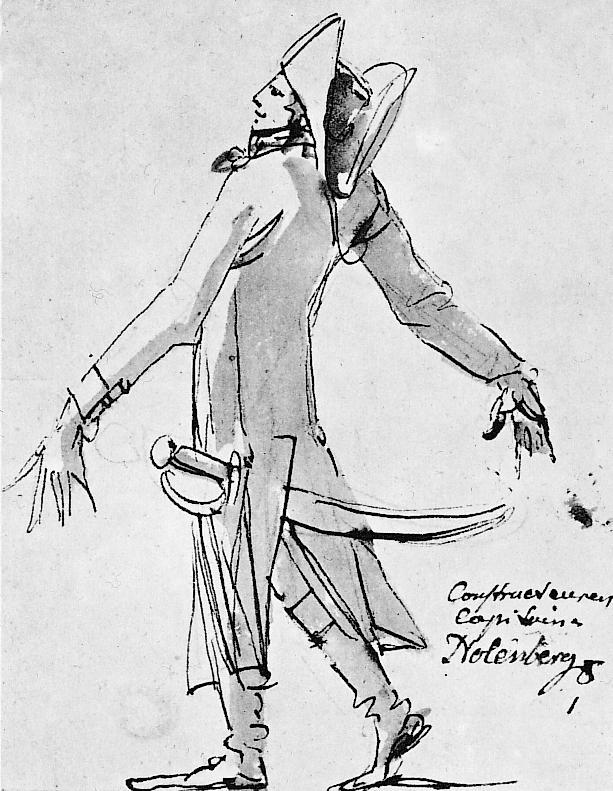
Caricature of Frantz Christopher Henrik Hohlenberg (1764-1804), Danish shipbuilder and naval officer, 1797

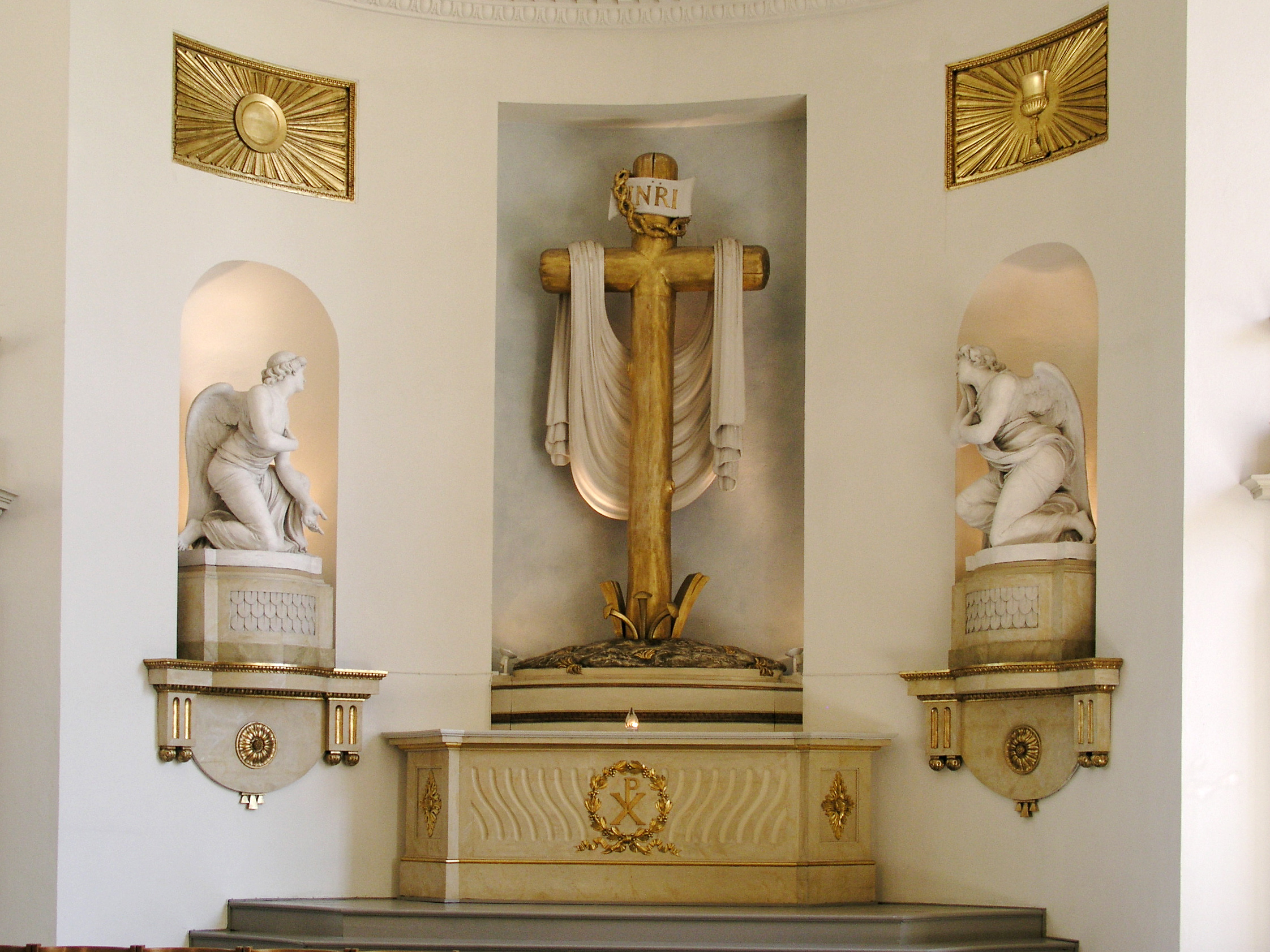
Altar cross of Karlstad Cathedral

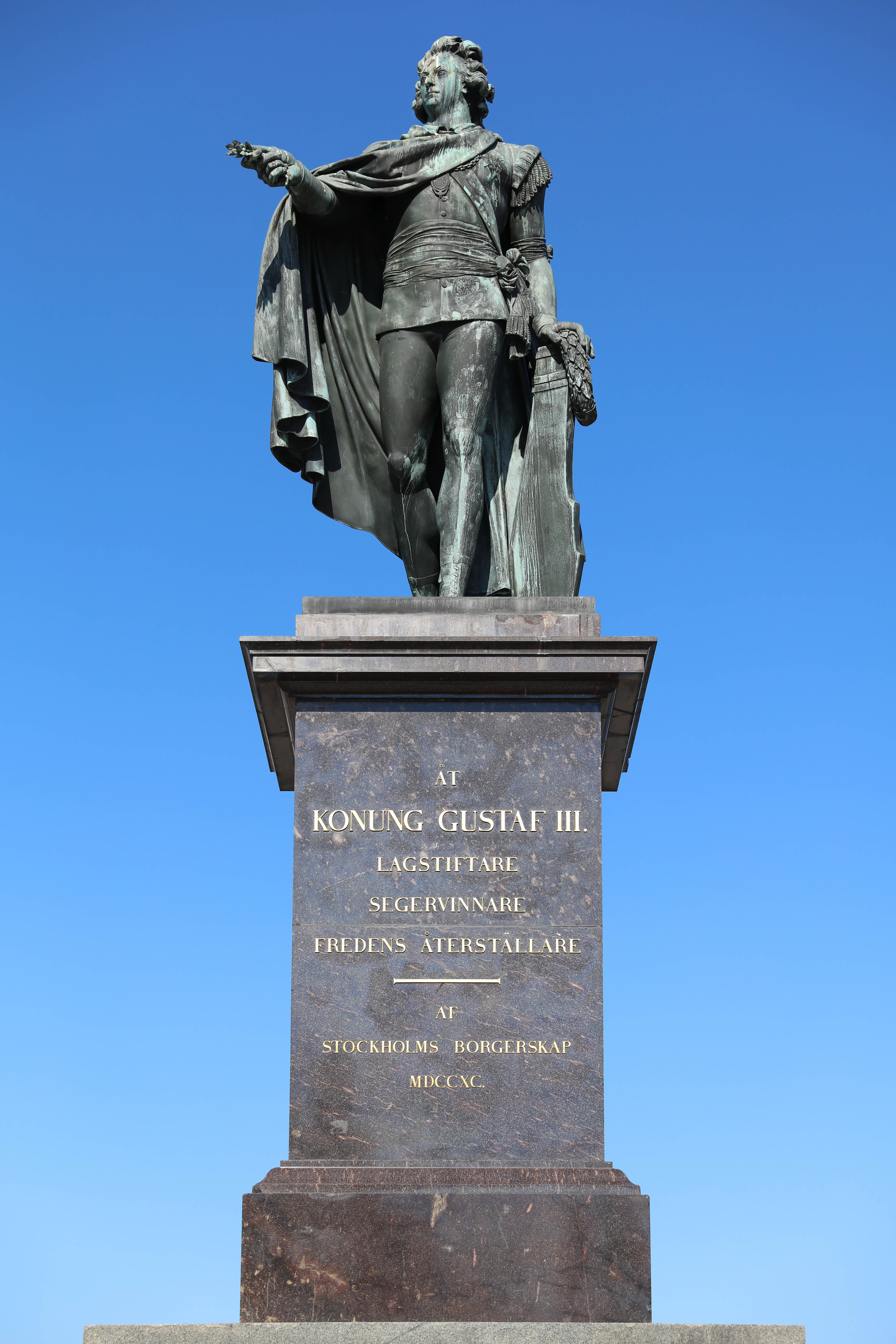
Statue of King Gustav III of Sweden, Skeppsbron, Stockholm. Dedicated 1808

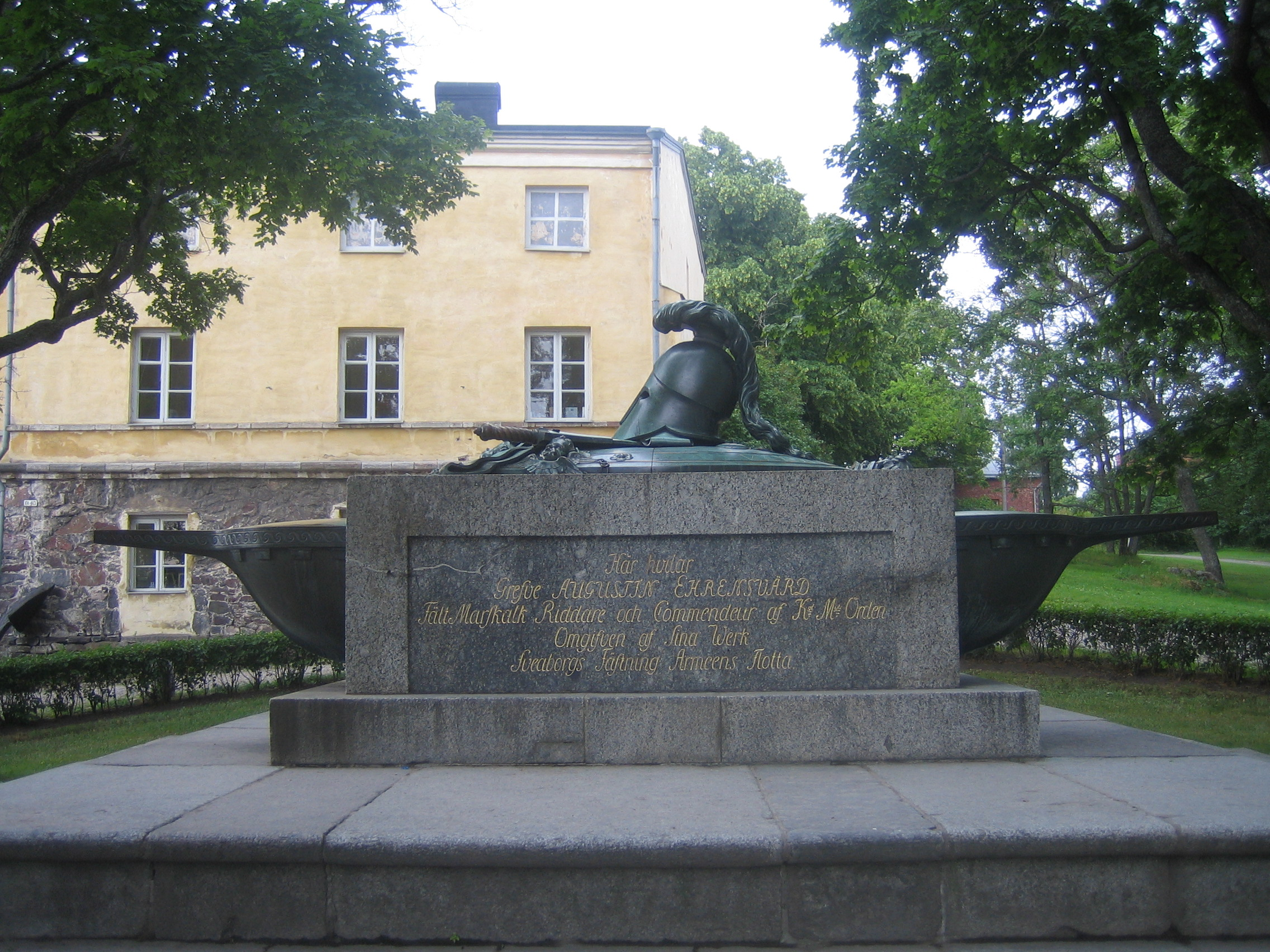
Tomb of Field Marshal Augustin Ehrensvärd's grave at Suomenlinna, 1805

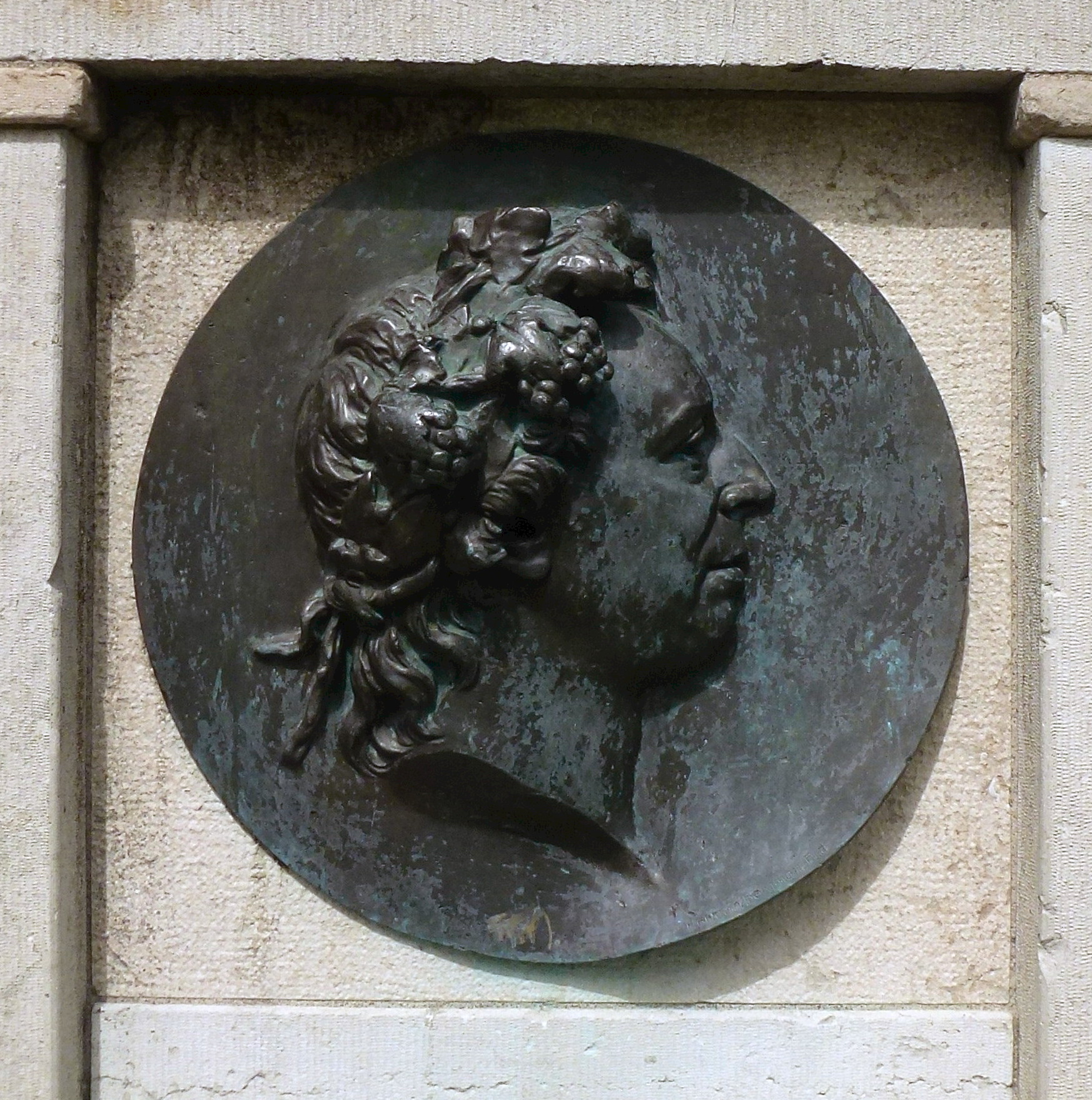
Medallion of Carl Michael Bellman, Bellmanskällan. Bronze

== Sources ==
- Gilman, D. C.; Peck, H. T.; Colby, F. M., eds. (1905). "Sergel, Johan Tobias" . New International Encyclopedia (1st ed.). New York: Dodd, Mead.

Attribution:
