= Felipe de León =

Spanish artist

Felipe de León (died 1728) was a Spanish painter of the Baroque period active in Seville. He imitated the style of Murillo in painting devotional pictures, and in producing copies of the master. He died at Seville. He is presumed to be the brother of the painter Cristóbal de León.
