= Giovanni Antonio Zaddei =

Italian painter

Giovanni Antonio Zaddei (17 January 1729 – unknown) was an Italian painter of the Baroque period, mainly active in Ferrara. He was born in Brescia.

== Biography ==
Zaddei studied with Antonio Paglia, then in 1746, he moved to Bologna to work under Giuseppe Marchesi, then five years later worked under Giovanni Battista Cignaroli. In 1754 he returned to Brescia, and also painted altarpieces for Gottolengo, Portesio, Coccaglio, and Preseglie.
