= Jonathan Fisher (painter) =

Irish painter and engraver (c. 1740–1809)

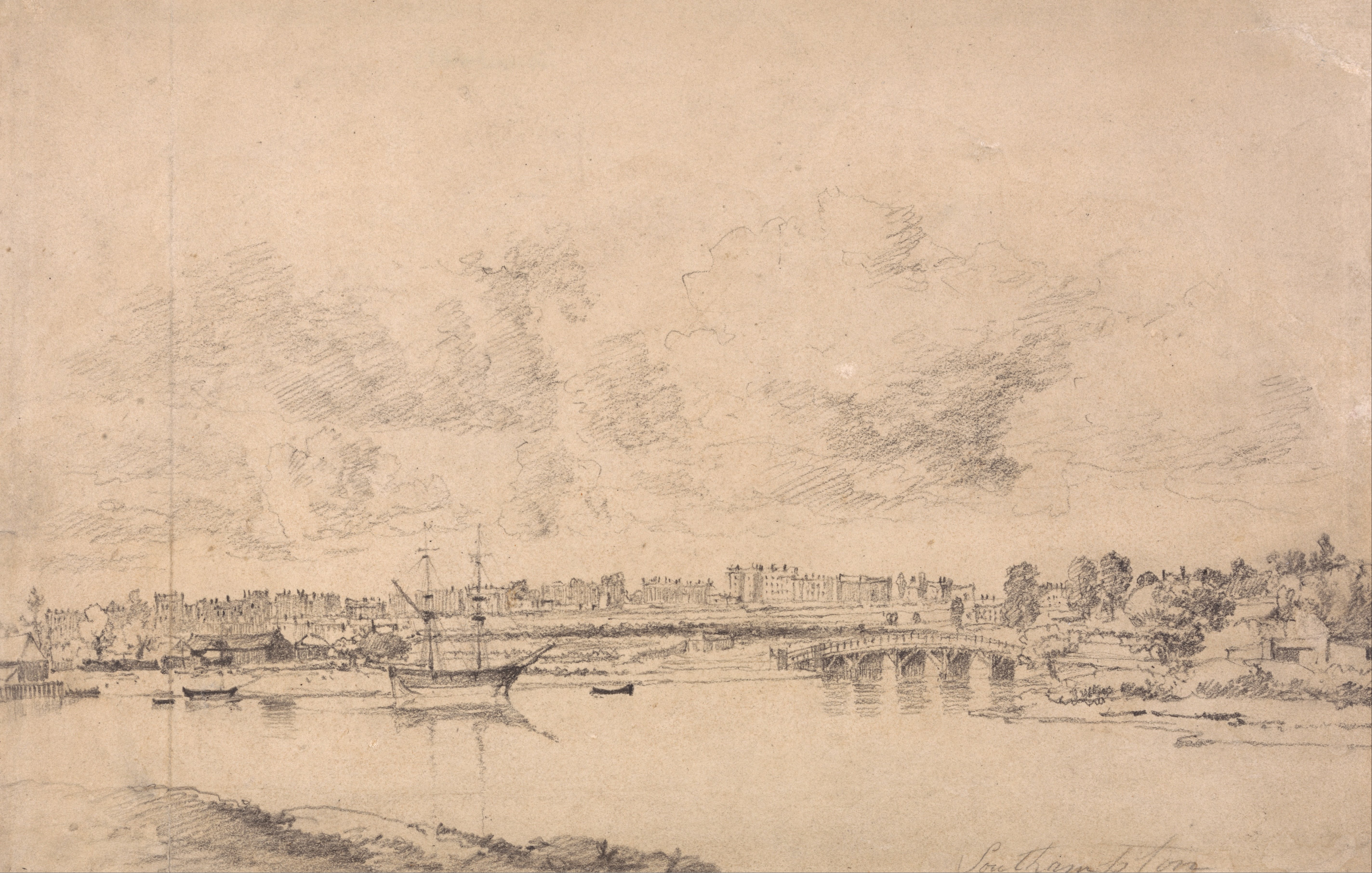
- Southampton and Northam from the River Itchen, graphite drawing, undated
- Born: Jonathan Fisher; 1740; Dublin, Ireland
- Died: 1809 (aged 68–69); Bishop Street, Dublin, Ireland
- Known for: Painting

Jonathan Fisher (c. 1740–1809) was an Irish painter and engraver.

== Life and family ==
Fisher was born in Dublin around 1740. Strickland claims that he was trained in London, there is no evidence to confirm this, and it is more likely that he was self-taught. According to Strickland, Fisher married a "Miss Price, a handsome, clever and fine-looking woman".

He lived on Dame Street in 1756, and later at Great Ship Street, Dublin, from about 1778 until 1805, when he moved to Bishop Street, Dublin. Fisher died at his home on Bishop Street in 1809, with his will proved on 8 December that year. He left all his art materials to Henry Graham, who had lived with him as a pupil and assistant.

== Career ==
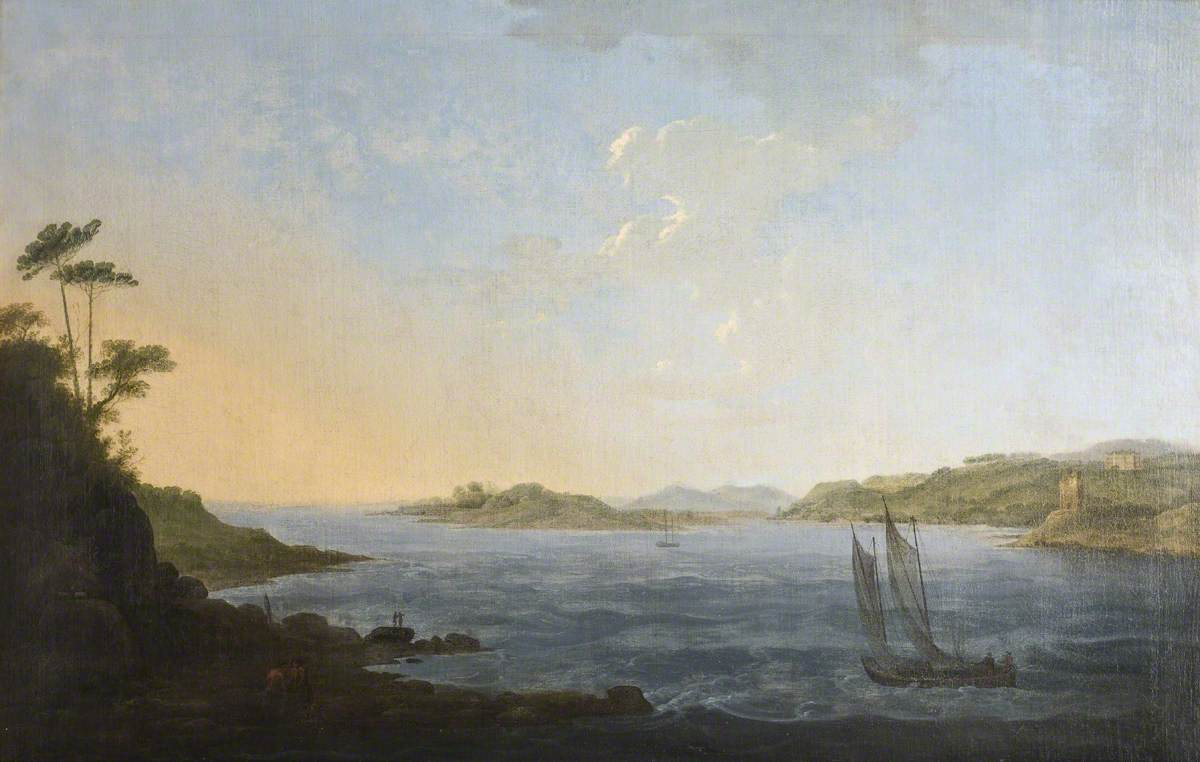
Strangford Lough (circa 1790) by Fisher

He is first recorded in 1763 when he was awarded a premium by the Dublin Society for a landscape where he was working as a linen draper in The Liberties, Dublin. He won an additional premium in 1768 for "the best original landscape painted in oil colours". In 1765, Fisher exhibited with the Society of Artists, going on to regularly exhibit with the Society until 1801.

He is best known for his fine engravings and aquatints of Irish scenery, travelling all over Ireland. He published views of Killarney in 1770 and 1789. The National Gallery of Ireland now hold two of the oil paintings from his 1770 series. The National Library of Ireland holds two sketchbooks attributed to Fisher for his views of Carlingford Lough published in London in 1772. The Ulster Museum holds one of the paintings associated with this series. In 1772 he published views of Kilkenny, Cork, Waterford, and Belfast.

In 1789, Fisher engraved a set of 20 views published under the title A picturesque tour of Killarney, dedicated to the first Earl of Portarlington, Fisher's patron. Portarlington and Fisher were close friends, and Portarlington helped secure a position for Fisher in 1778 as the supervisor of stamps in the stamp office at Eustace Street, Dublin. From 1792 Fisher worked on a series of 60 views, which were published as Scenery of Ireland illustrated in a series of prints of select views, castles and abbies, drawn and engraved in aquatint in 1795. In the preface of this publication Fisher claimed it was "the first of its kind ever executed in this kingdom".

In 1781 Fisher was cited as one of the most notable contemporary painters in Ireland by the architect James Gandon. The Dublin Society invited Fisher to sit on a sub-committee to assess the quality of a new watercolour paint in 1783. A set of Fisher's Views of Killarney and 3 sets of his Scenery of Ireland were acquired by the Society to be used in their drawing schools.

His collection of 65 artworks was sold in Dublin after his death. The collection included works from Angelica Kauffman, Richard Wilson, Thomas Gainsborough and other Dutch and Italian artists. Graham oversaw the sale.

== Literature ==
- J. S. Powell: Pavilioned in Splendour.
- Irish Times. Saturday, June 12, 1999, and Saturday, October 27, 2007.
- James Gandon, edited by Thomas Mulvany: The Life of James Gandon, pp. 148–149.
