= The Trout Stream =

Painting by J. M. W. Turner

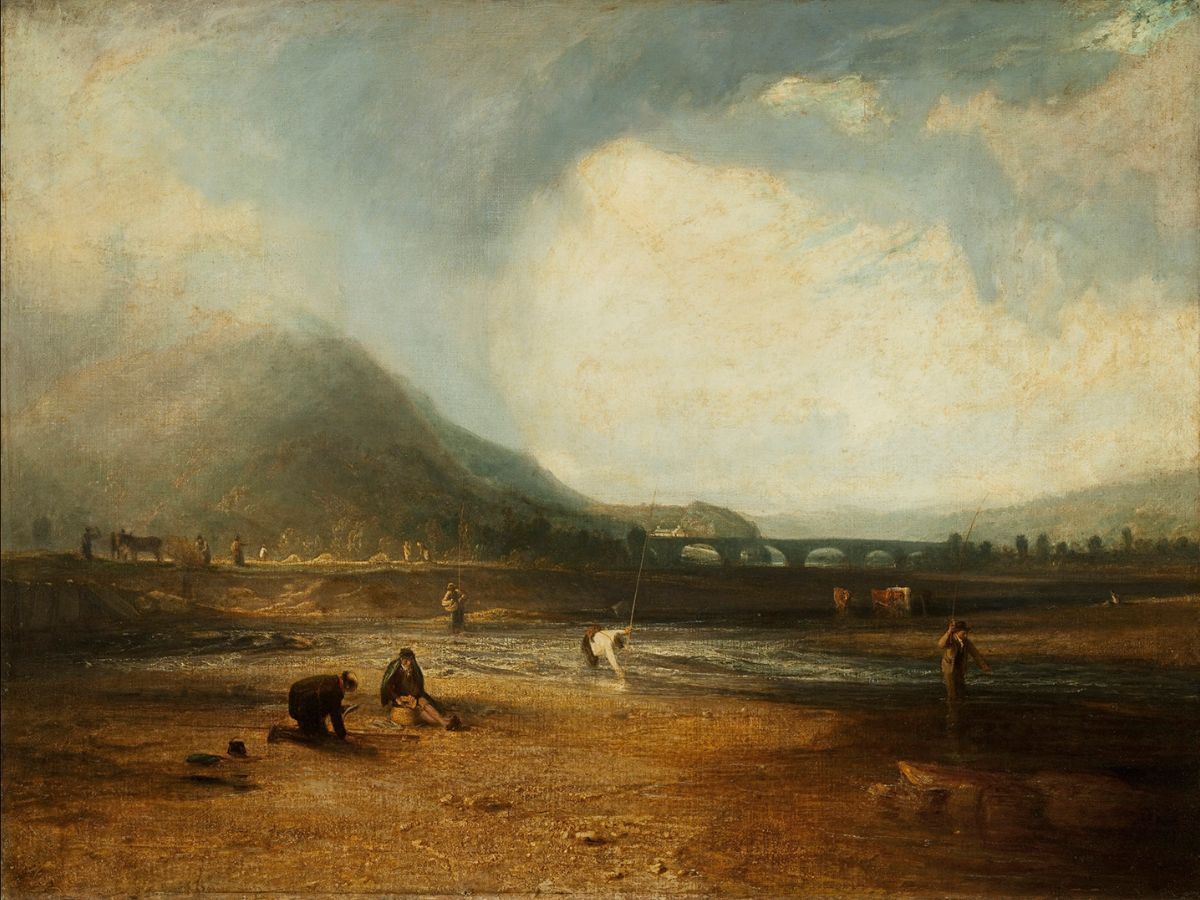
- Artist: J. M. W. Turner
- Year: 1809
- Type: Oil on canvas, landscape painting
- Dimensions: 91.4 cm × 121.9 cm (36.0 in × 48.0 in)
- Location: Taft Museum of Art; Cincinnati

The Trout Stream is an 1809 landscape painting by the British artist J.M.W. Turner. It depicts a view of the River Dee in North Wales with anglers fishing trout. it was displayed at Turner's own gallery in Queen Anne Street in Marylebone rather than at the Royal Academy's Summer Exhibition at Somerset House. It was purchased by Earl of Essex for his country estate of Cassiobury Park in Hertfordshire. Today it is in the Taft Museum of Art in Cincinnati in Ohio.

== See also ==
- List of paintings by J. M. W. Turner

== Bibliography ==
- Bailey, Anthony. J.M.W. Turner: Standing in the Sun. Tate Enterprises, 2013.
- Hamilton, James. Turner and the Scientists. Tate Gallery Publishing, 1998.
- Sullivan, Edward J. The Taft Museum: Its History and Collections · Volume 1. Hudson Hills Press, 1995.
