= Arthur Griffiths (author) =

British prison administrator and author (1838–1908)

Arthur George Frederick Griffiths (9 December 1838 – 24 March 1908) was a British military officer, prison administrator and author who published more than 60 books during his lifetime. He was also a military historian who wrote extensively about the wars of the 19th century, and was for a time military correspondent for The Times newspaper.

== Upbringing and career ==
Griffiths was born on 9 December 1838, at Poona, India, the second son of Lieut.-colonel John Griffiths of the 6th Royal Warwickshire regiment. After graduating from King William's College on the Isle of Man, Arthur Griffiths joined the British Army as an ensign in the 63rd Regiment of Foot on 13 February 1855.

Serving in the Crimean War, Griffiths participated in the siege of Sevastopol. He also fought during the capture of Kinbum, receiving the British Crimea Medal.

His later accounts of crime and punishment in England were "sensational and grotesque", designed to appeal to the baser fascinations of his Victorian readers. Their success led him to write some 60 books, many of them mystery crime novels, such as A Son of Mars (1880) and Fast and Loose (1885).
