= Franz Edmund Weirotter =

Austrian painter, draughtsman and etcher

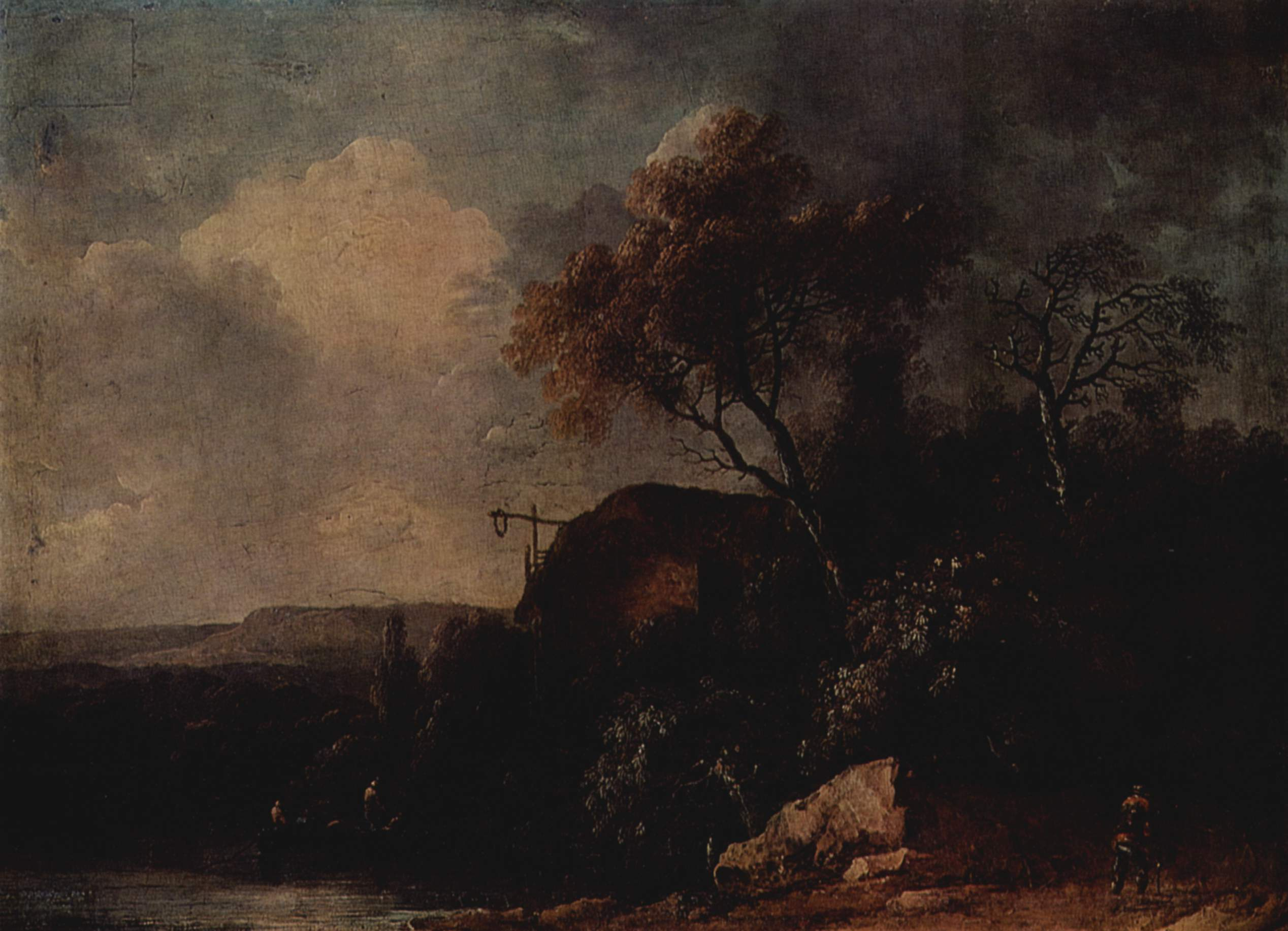
Franz Edmund Weirotter, Landscape with Hut at the River, Hermitage Museum

Franz Edmund Weirotter (May 1733 – 11 May 1771) was an Austrian painter, draughtsman and etcher.

Weirotter was born in Innsbruck, and painted primarily landscapes and maritime scenes. He traveled to Paris and Rome where he produced a number of paintings and etchings. Some of his works reside at the Fine Arts Museums of San Francisco. Weirotter died in Vienna on 11 May 1771.
