= William Scrots =

English painter

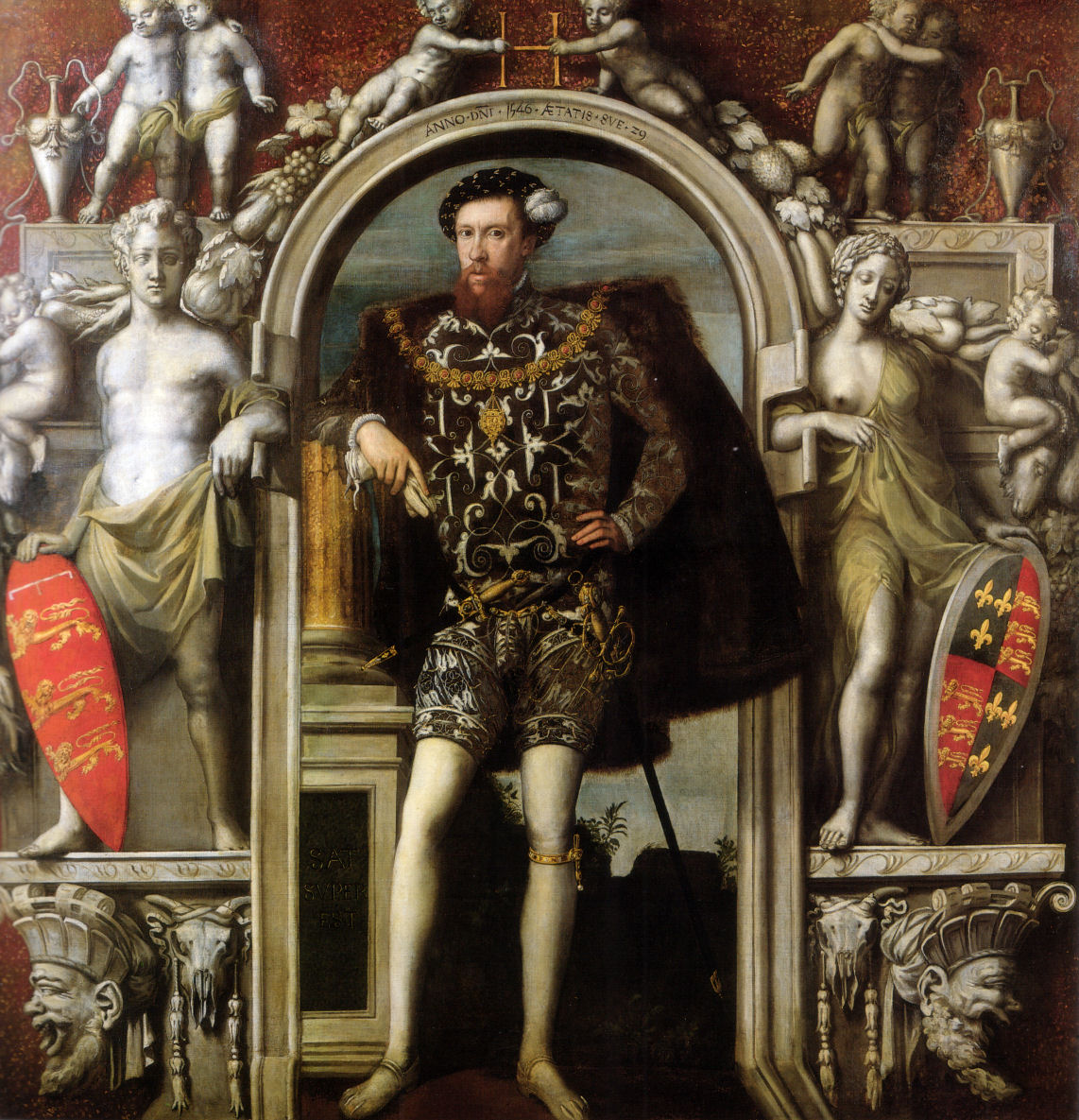
Henry Howard, Earl of Surrey, 1546. Attributed to William Scrots.

William (or Guillim) Scrots (or Scrotes or Stretes; active 1537–1553) was a painter of the Tudor court and an exponent of the Mannerist style of painting in the Netherlands.

== Biography ==
Scrots is first heard of when appointed a court painter to Mary of Austria, Regent of the Netherlands, in 1537. In England, he followed Hans Holbein as King's Painter to Henry VIII in 1546, with a substantial annual salary of £62 10s, over twice as much as Holbein's thirty pounds a year. He continued in this role during the reign of the boy king Edward VI. His salary was stopped on Edward's death in 1553, after which it is not known what became of him, though it is presumed he left England.

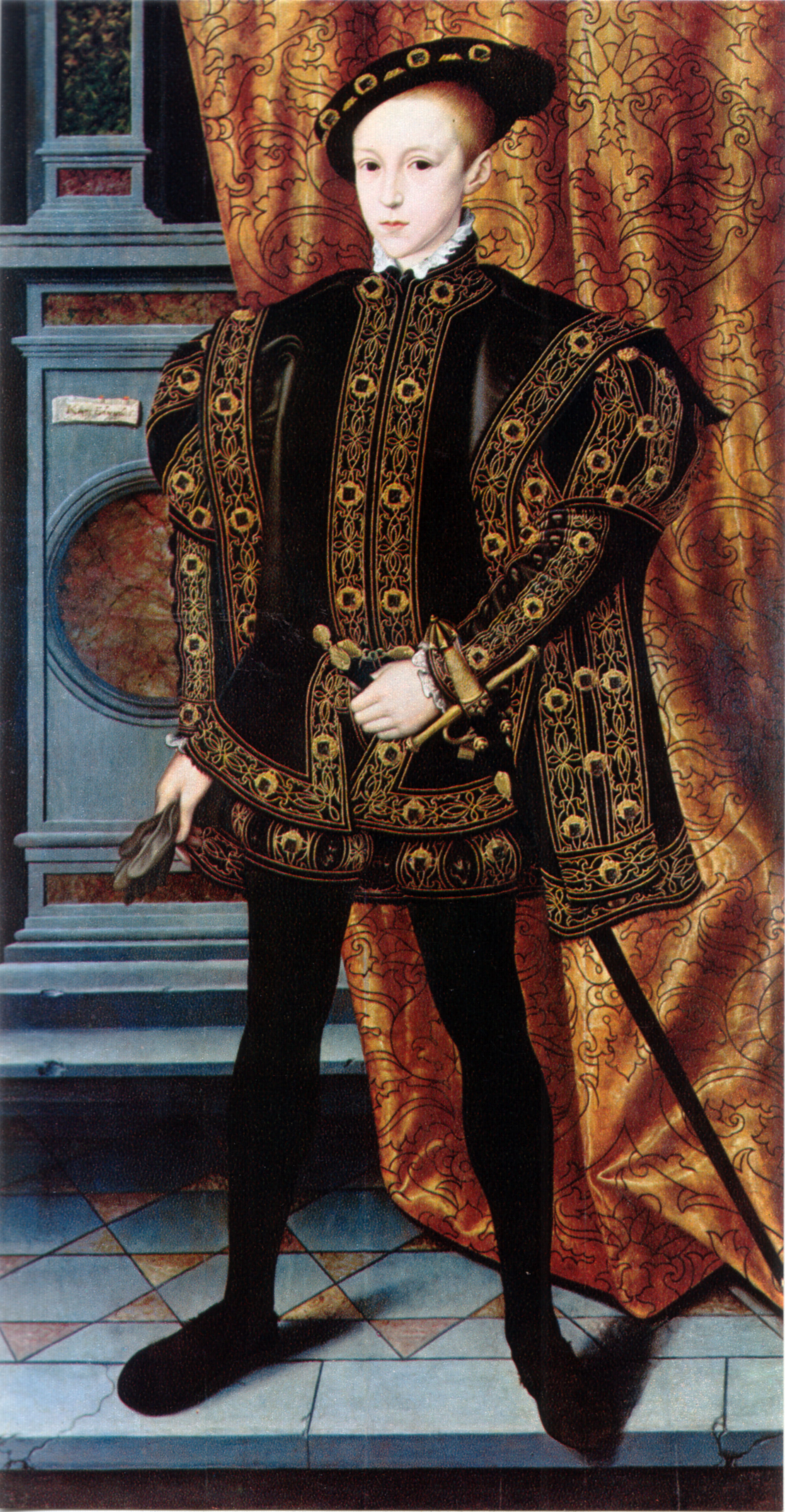
Edward VI, attributed to Scrots, Hampton Court.

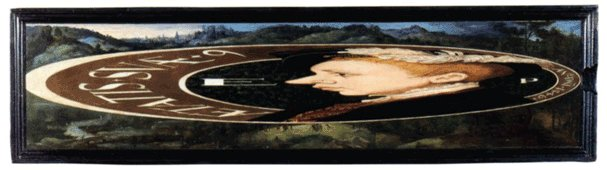
Anamorphic portrait of Edward VI, 1546.

Little more is known of Scrots other than that his paintings showed an interest in ingenious techniques and detailed accessories. Scrots was paid 50 marks in 1551 for three "great tables", two of which were portraits of Edward delivered to the ambassadors Thomas Hoby and John Mason as gifts for foreign monarchs, and the third a "picture of the late earle of Surrey attainted." Two full-length portraits of Edward VI in a pose similar to that of Holbein's portrait of his father, one now in the Royal Collection (left) and another now in the Louvre (below), are attributed to Scrots and are likely to be these two paintings. Scrots also painted an anamorphic profile of Edward VI, distorted so that it is impossible to view it normally except from a special angle to the side. This optical trick is similar to that used by Holbein in his painting The Ambassadors and in contemporary portraits of Francis I and Ferdinand I. Later, when the painting was exhibited at Whitehall Palace in the winter of 1591–92, it created a sensation, and important visitors were all taken to see it.

== Assessment ==
In the words of art historian Ellis Waterhouse, "although Scrots was not a painter of high creative or imaginative gifts, he knew all the latest fashions, and a series of paintings appeared at the English court during the next few years which could vie in modernity with those produced anywhere in northern Europe". In particular, Scrots seems to have helped popularise the full-length portrait at the same time as it became fashionable on the continent.

Scrots's portrait of Henry Howard, Earl of Surrey, takes a strikingly different approach to portraiture from that previously adopted by Holbein and other painters in England. This, especially in the enframing architectural statuary, is in the Mannerist style that had originated in Florence and then spread to the France of Francis I and to the Netherlands. It exhibits the elongation of the figure typical of the style. The artist depicts the earl dressed in fantastically ornamented clothing and surrounds him with architectural details and emblems from classical sculpture. These may relate to the only large-scale Mannerist project in England, then nearing completion, Nonsuch Palace in Surrey. The painting set a new fashion for English portraiture. The earl was executed in 1547 on suspicion of treason; some (indeed most) of the evidence brought against him was that he had made inappropriate use of the Royal Arms of England, as indeed he does here. He was of royal descent, but these were not his personal arms. A heraldic drawing was produced in evidence, but this painting does not seem to have been mentioned at his trial.

A three-quarter length painting of Edward as Prince of Wales with Hunsdon House, Hertfordshire, in the background and the famous portrait of Elizabeth I as princess (illustration), both dated to 1546, have been long suggested as undocumented works by Scrots, but art historians have recently questioned that attribution. Both paintings are in the Royal Collection at Windsor Castle.

== Gallery ==
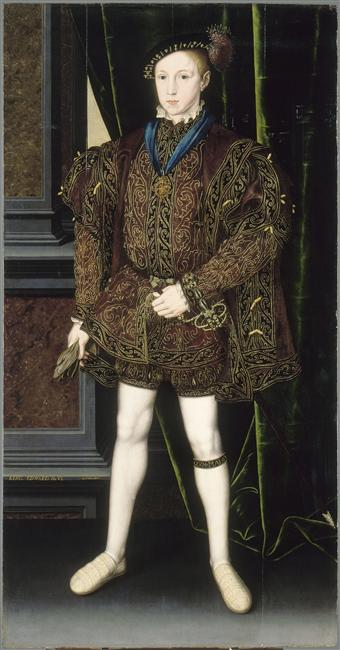
Edward VI, Musée du Louvre. The painting was sent to the French court in 1552.

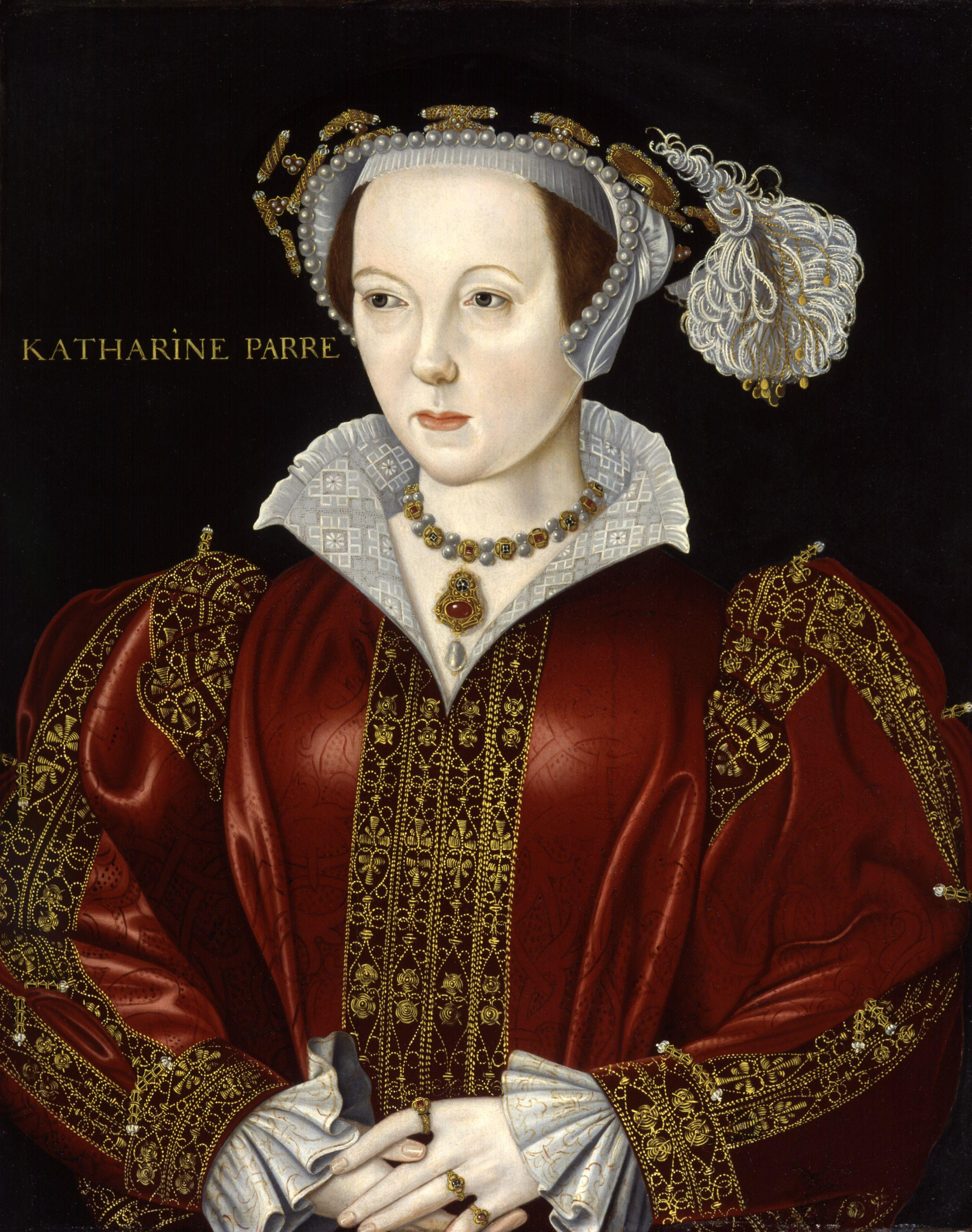
Queen Katherine Parr, c. 1545. The original is in the National Portrait Gallery, London, with a copy in the collection of Trinity College, Cambridge.

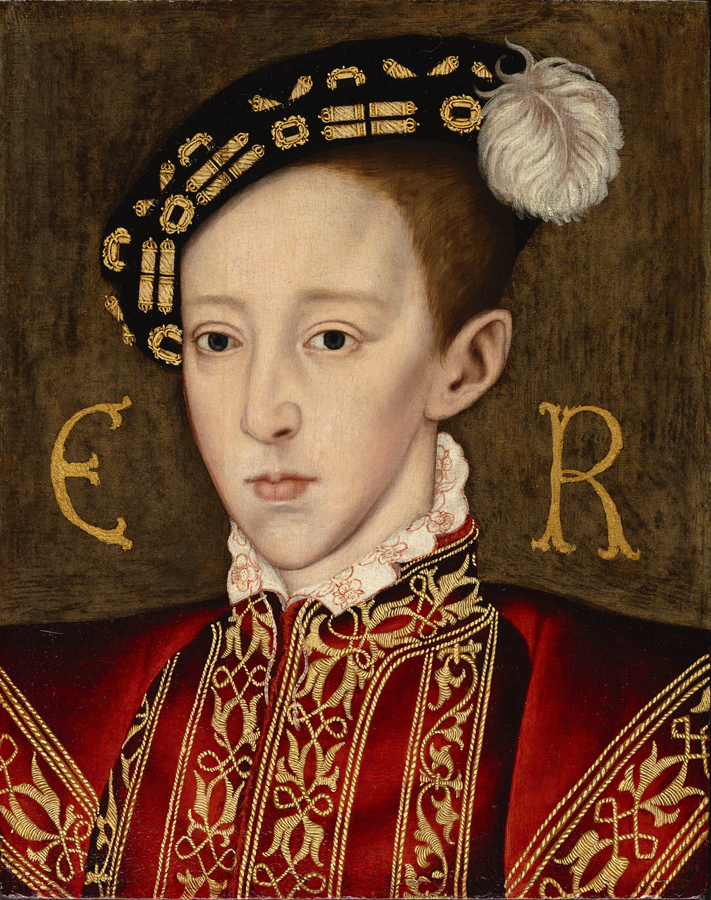
Edward VI, c. 1550

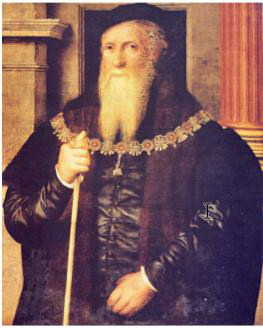
Portrait of Sir Anthony Wingfield, c. 1550
