= Saverio Gandini =

Italian painter (1729–1796)

Saverio Gandini (1729 – 9 March 1796) was an Italian painter of the late-Baroque and Neoclassic periods, mainly active in Brescia then in the Republic of Venice.

Born in Cremona, he became a pupil of Ferdinando Galli-Bibiena. As a young man, he traveled to Rome to paint and study for a few years, then returned to Brescia.
