= Harvest Dinner, Kingston Bank =

Painting by J. M. W. Turner

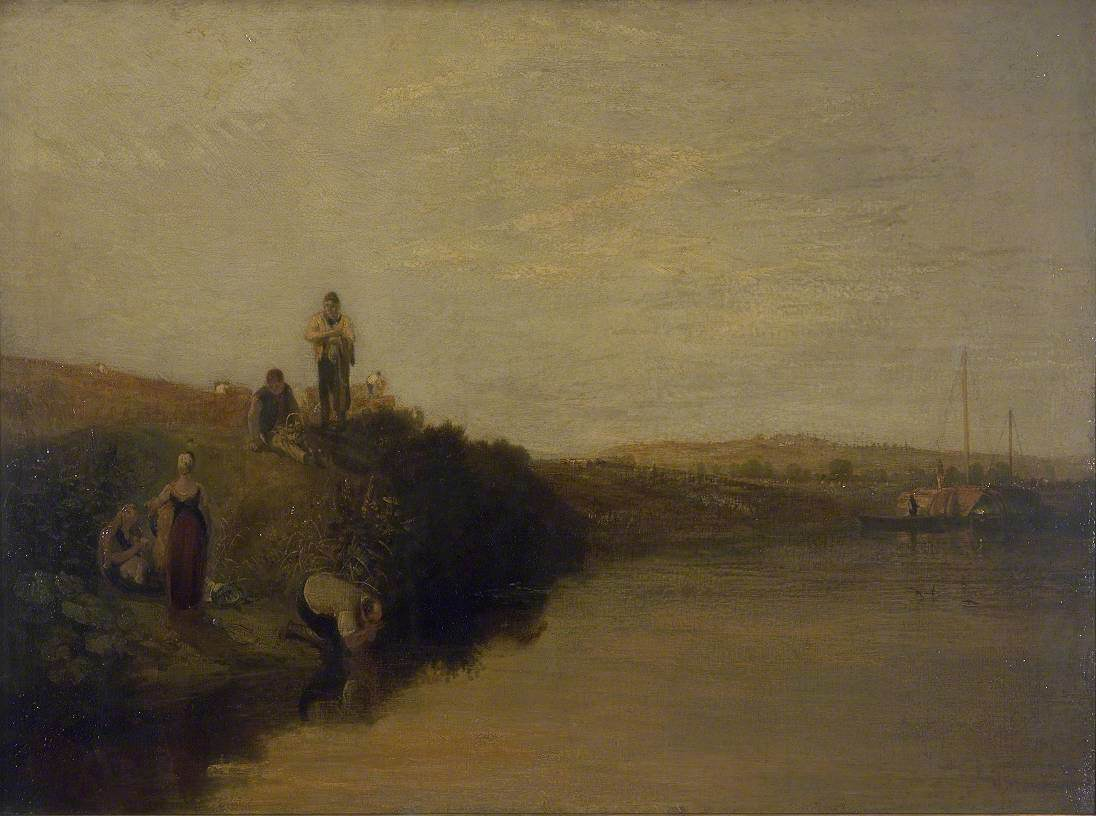
- Artist: J. M. W. Turner
- Year: 1809
- Type: Oil on canvas, landscape painting
- Dimensions: 121 cm × 90.2 cm (48 in × 35.5 in)
- Location: Tate Britain, London
- Website: www.tate.org.uk/...n00491

Harvest Dinner, Kingston Bank is an 1809 oil painting by the British artist J.M.W. Turner. Combining elements of genre painting and landscape painting, it depicts a view of the River Thames near Kingston. Five labourers are sitting down to a harvest dinner by a wheatfield.

Turner had sketched the figures in 1805, possibly from a boat in the River. Rather than submitting the painting the Royal Academy Turner exhibited it in his own artist's studio in Queen Anne Street in Marylebone. While visiting the exhibition John Sell Cotman managed to sketch a furtive copy of the artwork. It formed part of the Turner Bequest to the nation and is in the collection of the Tate Britain.

== See also ==
- List of paintings by J. M. W. Turner

== Bibliography ==
- Bailey, Anthony. J.M.W. Turner: Standing in the Sun. Tate Enterprises, 2013.
- Schneer, Jonathan. The Thames: England's River. Little, Brown Book Group, 2015.
- Wilton, Andrew.Turner in His Time. H.N. Abrams, 1987.
