= Anna Sibylla Sergell =

Swedish artist (1733–1819)

Anna Sibylla Sergell Howe
- Born: Anna Brita Sergel; 1733
- Died: 1819 (aged 85–86)
- Known for: Embroidery, Interior Design
- Spouse: Johan Howe

Anna Brita Sergel or Anna Sibylla Sergell, later surname Howe (1733–1819), was a Swedish artist (embroidery), an official decorator of the royal Swedish court.

Sergel was the daughter of the embroidery decorator of the royal Swedish court, Christoffer Sergel, and Elisabet Swyrner from Germany. Her brother was the artist Johan Tobias Sergel. In 1754, she married the vine-master of the court, Johan Valentin Howe or Hovje (d. 1760).

Sergel was the professional assistant of her father until his death in 1773. After her father's death, she shared the position of official decorator in embroidery of the court with her sister, Maria Sofia. Among the most famous works made by the two sisters, was the interior decoration of the royal Fredrikshov Palace.
