= Cristóbal de León =

Spanish painter

Cristóbal de León (died 1729) was a Spanish painter, active near Seville. He was a pupil of Juan Valdes Leal. He painted eighteen monastic portraits, and some for the church of San Felipe Neri in Seville. He died at Seville. He is presumed to be the brother of the painter Felipe de León.
