= Pierre-Joseph Lion =

French painter

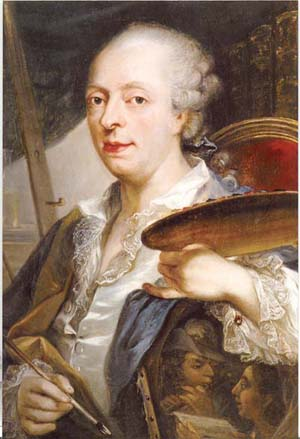
Self-portrait, 1779

Pierre-Joseph Lion (7 May 1729, in Dinant – 1 September 1809, in Dinant) was a painter from the Roman Catholic Diocese of Liège.

Ninth child of the notary Henri-Ghislain and Adalaide Golenvaux, Lion traveled extensively and worked in several European capitals, including London, Paris, Vienna and Brussels. In the Habsburg capital, he was the official painter of the Empress Maria Theresa and her son, Joseph II, Holy Roman Emperor.

== Works ==
- Portrait of Jacques Heuskin, prior Crosier of Liège, pastel, 61 × 50 cm, 1756.
- Portrait of JB Dufresne penultimate abbot of Floreffe, oil on canvas, 115.5 × 87 cm, 1777 (preserved in the seminar Floreffe).
- Self Portrait, 1779.
- Portrait, black chalk heightened with watercolor on paper, 22 × 16.5 cm, 1796.
- Portrait of Baron Buddenhocki (?), Oil on canvas, 84 × 66 cm (in the Museum of Groesbeeck Croix, Namur).
- Portrait of old lady, oil on canvas, 54 × 46 cm (kept at the Hotel de Dinant).
- Portrait of Miss Lucy and Miss Frances Carpenter, 107.3 × 92 cm.
