= Scipione Angelini =

Italian painter (1661–1729)

Still Life of Flowers with Tulips and Peonies in a Glass Vase

Scipione Angelini (1661–1729) was a painter of the Baroque period, best known for still-lifes. He was born in Ascoli Piceno, Papal States in 1661 and studied under his father, the painter Bernardino Angelini. He worked mainly in Perugia and made a name for himself as a painter of still-lifes.
