= Simon Gribelin =

French engraver (1661–1733)

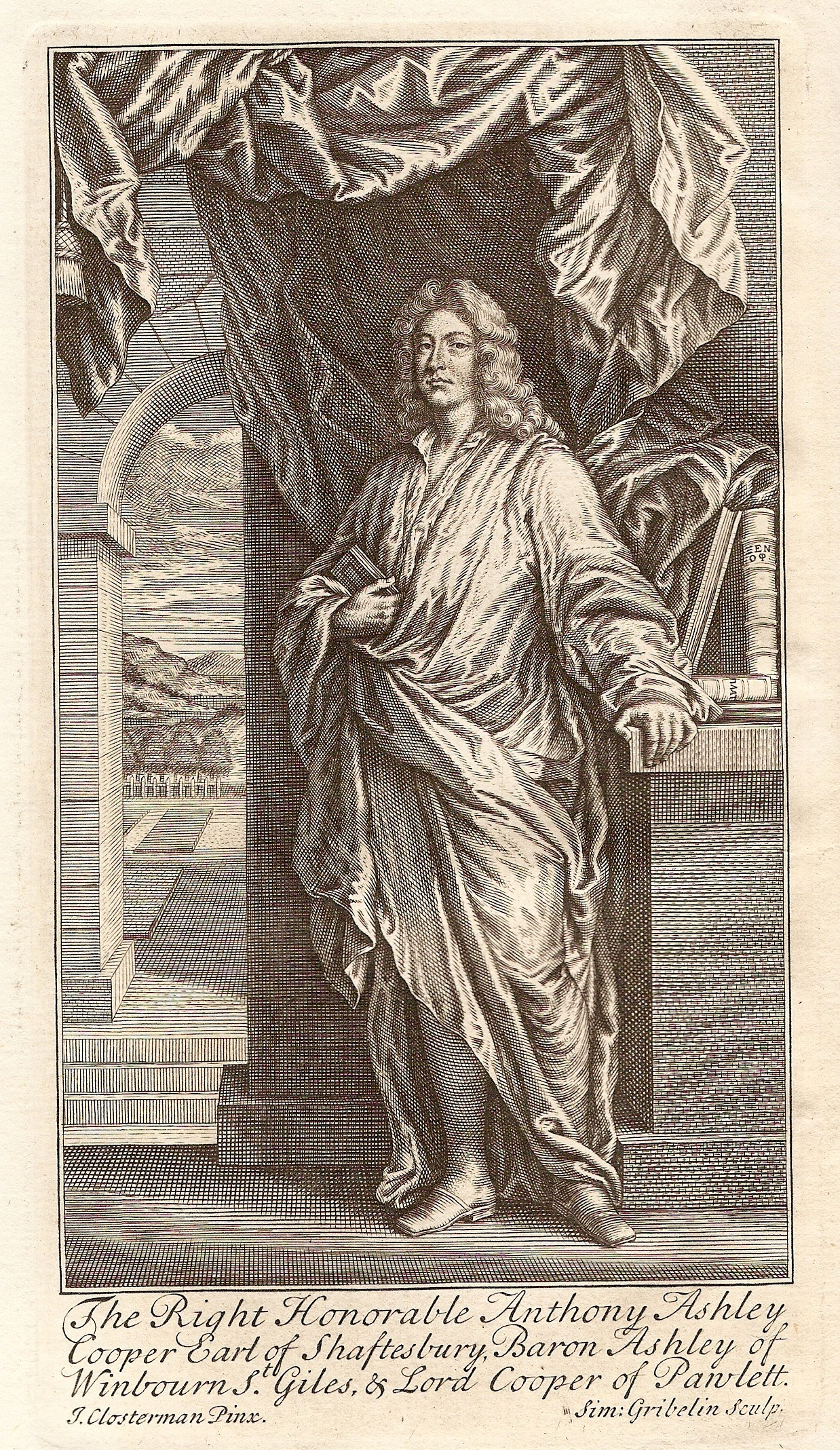
Anthony Ashley-Cooper, 3rd Earl of Shaftesbury by Simon Gribelin, from "Characteristicks of Men, Manners, Opinions, Times" 5th edition, 1732

Simon Gribelin (1661–1733) was a French line engraver.

== Family ==
Gribelin was born at Blois, Orléanais in 1661, and appears to have been a son of Jacob Gribelin, an engraver, who died at Paris in 1676. After being trained in the art of engraving in Paris, he came to England about 1680. Gribelin had a son who was an engraver, and went as a draughtsman to Turkey in the service of George Hay, 8th Earl of Kinnoull.

== Early career ==
There is a view of the Old Trinity Hospital at Deptford engraved by him in 1701. But his first work of importance was a copy of Gerard Edelinck's fine engraving of 'Alexander entering the Tent of Darius,' after Charles Le Brun, published in 1707. Soon afterwards he engraved a frontispiece and vignettes for a translation by Elizabeth Elstob of 'An English-Saxon Homily on the Birth-Day of St. Gregory' (1709), and within an initial letter he placed a neatly executed portrait of the translator. In 1712 he published six engravings from the following pictures in the royal collection at Kensington Palace: ‘Hercules between Virtue and Vice,’ after Paolo de Matteis; ‘The Adoration of the Shepherds,’ after Palma Vecchio; ‘Esther fainting before Ahasuerus,’ and ‘The Nine Muses in Olympus,’ after Tintoretto; ‘The Birth of Jupiter and Juno’ (or rather ‘The Birth of Apollo and Diana’), after Giulio Romano; and ‘The Judgment of Midas,’ after Andrea Schiavone.

== Plate collections ==
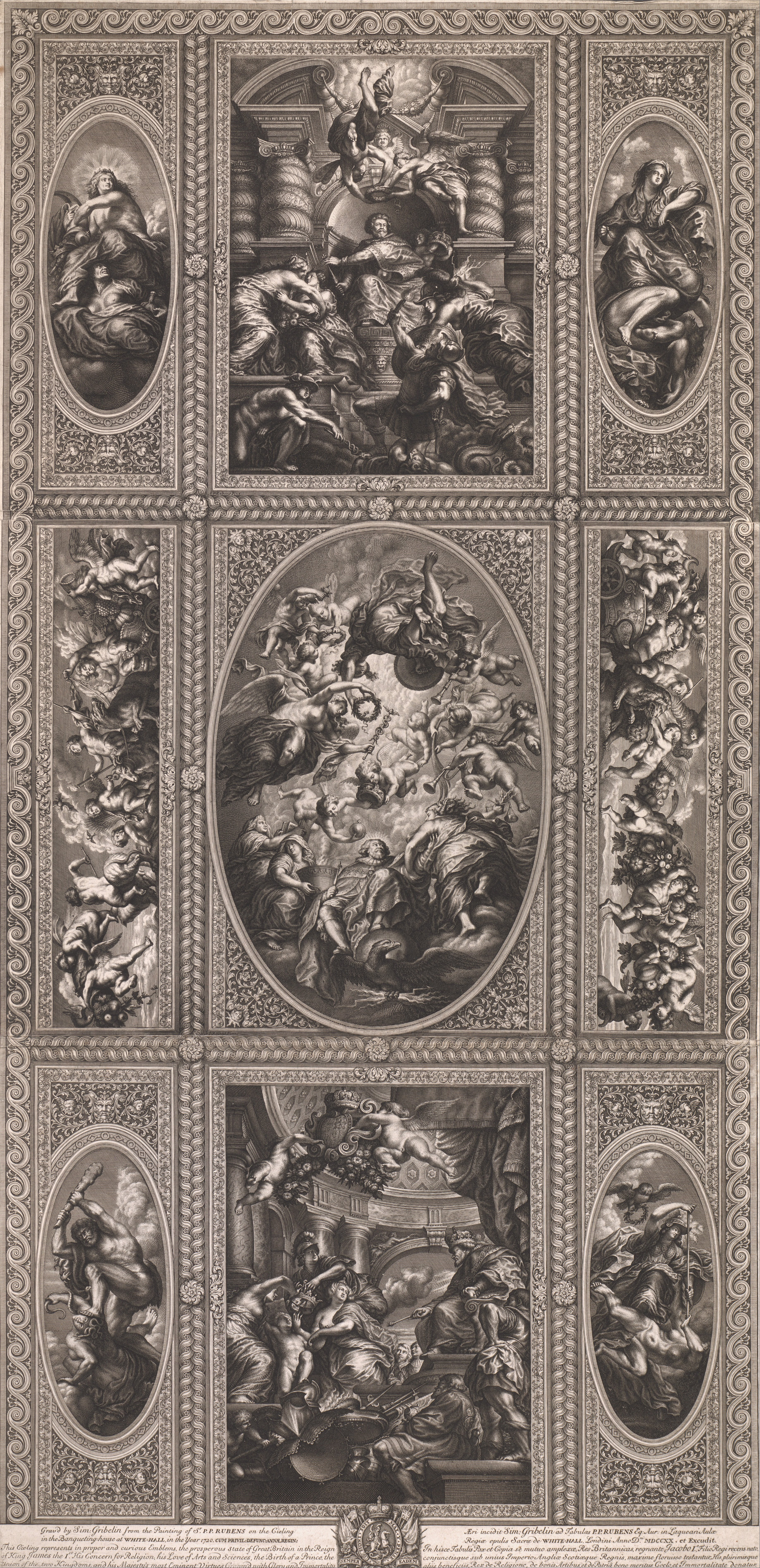
Painting of the Ceiling in the Banqueting House at Whitehall

In 1707 he completed a set of seven small plates of the cartoons of Raphael, with a title-page composed of a sectional view of the apartment at Hampton Court Palace in which they were then placed, and a circular portrait of Queen Anne. This series, not having been published before as a whole, met with great success. But his most important work was a large engraving on three plates, finished in 1730, of ‘The Apotheosis of James I,’ from the painting by Peter Paul Rubens on the ceiling of the banquet house at Whitehall. None of his plates, however, give any adequate idea of the style of the masters from whom they are copied, and, as George Vertue remarks, ‘at best are neat memorandums.’

== Later career ==
He also engraved some portraits, among which are those of William III and Queen Mary, after Fowler; Prince William, Duke of Gloucester, after Sir Godfrey Kneller; Frederick Schomberg, 1st Duke of Schomberg; James Butler, 1st Duke of Ormonde, after Dahl; Sir William Dawes, archbishop of York, after Clostermann; and a small full-length of Anthony Ashley-Cooper, 3rd Earl of Shaftesbury, after the same painter, for the edition of the Characteristicks issued in 1714. There is also by him a set of thirty-seven plates of designs for goldsmith's work, as well as a large number of vignettes and head- and tail-pieces for the decoration of books. Gribelin died in Long Acre, London, on 18 January 1733, aged seventy-two, from a cold caught in going to see the king in the House of Lords. There is in the British Museum a volume of all his smaller plates, collected by himself, which was formerly in Vertue's possession.

== Consideration for Great Seal of the United States ==
Historian Derek Davis notes that in 1776 a committee was appointed by the Continental Congress for creating an official seal. Its members were Benjamin Franklin, Thomas Jefferson, and John Adams. While Franklin and Jefferson proposed symbolism taken from the Book of Exodus, John Adams argued for a seal based on Gribelin's engraving "The Judgement of Hercules" which was an illustration in a book in his personal library. Adams' proposal did not gain support and a different design was eventually chosen.
