= 1665 in art =

List of years in art	(table)
- … 1655; 1656; 1657; 1658; 1659; 1660; 1661; 1662; 1663; 1664; 1665; 1666; 1667; 1668; 1669; 1670; 1671; 1672; 1673; 1674; 1675 …
- Art; Archaeology; Architecture; Literature; Music; Philosophy; Science; +...

Events from the year 1665 in art.

== Events ==
- April – Gian Lorenzo Bernini arrives in Paris, where he remains until November, fêted by the population.
- Claude Perrault begins work on the eastern wing of the Louvre.

== Works ==
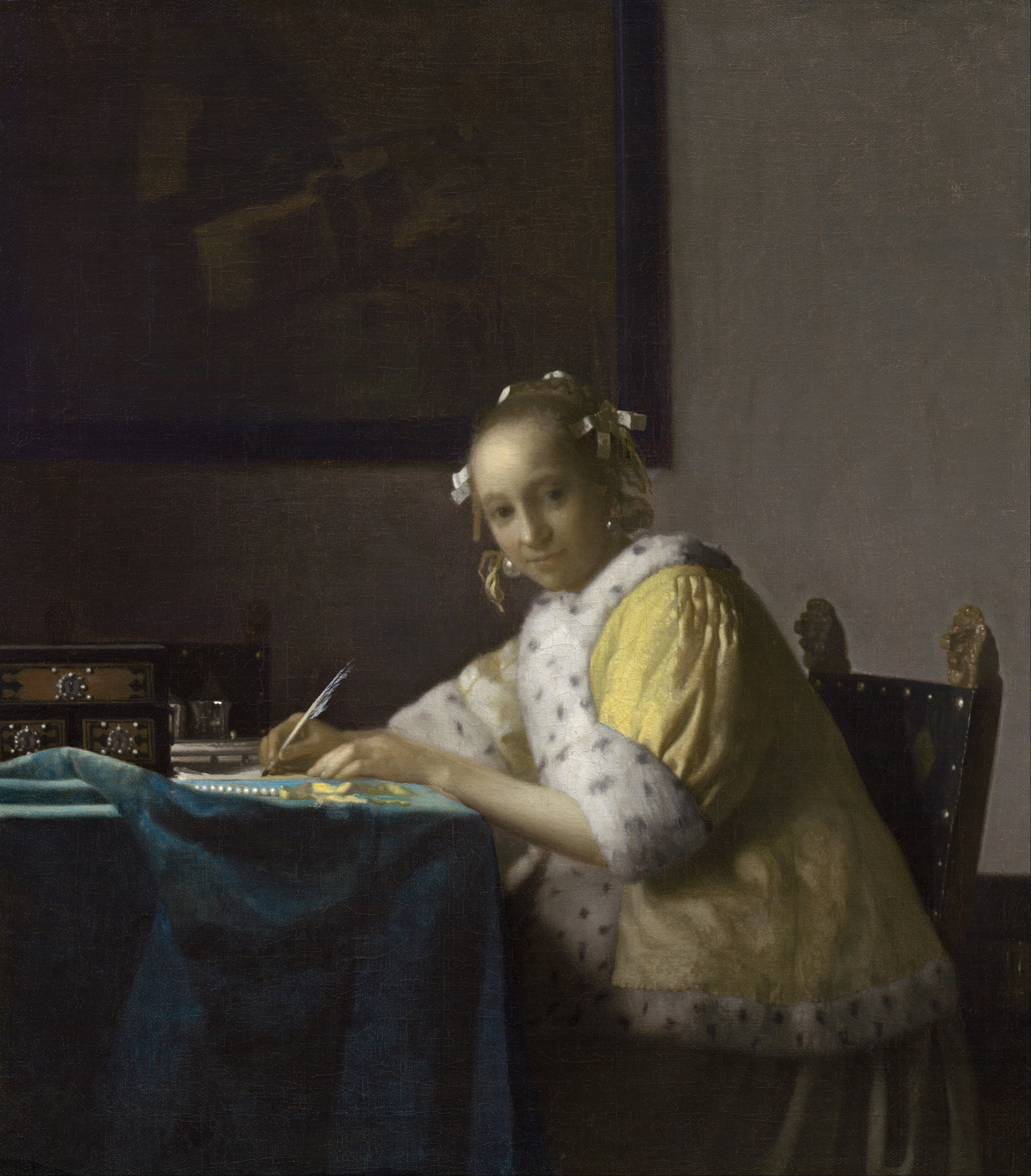
Vermeer – A Lady Writing a Letter

- Gabriël Metsu
  - Lady Reading a Letter (1662–65; National Gallery of Ireland)
  - Man Writing a Letter (1662–65; National Gallery of Ireland)
- Murillo – The Dolorosa Madonna
- Jacob Ochtervelt – Street Musicians at the Door
- Rembrandt – David and Uriah
- Jan Vermeer
  - A Lady Writing a Letter (National Gallery of Art, Washington, D.C.)
  - Woman with a Pearl Necklace

== Births ==
- March 14 - Giuseppe Crespi, Italian late Baroque painter of the Bolognese School (died 1747)
- March 21 - José Benito de Churriguera, Spanish architect and sculptor (died 1725)
- May 7 - Maurelio Scanavini, Italian painter of the Baroque period, mainly active in Ferrara (died 1698)
- date unknown
  - Claude Duflos, French engraver (died 1727)
  - Jean-Louis Lemoyne, French sculptor (died 1755)
  - Francesco Penso, Venetian sculptor (died 1737)
  - Tommaso Redi Italian painter, active in his native Florence (died 1726)
  - Norbert Roettiers, Flemish engraver (died 1727)
  - Giovanni Enrico Vaymer, Italian portrait painter (died 1738)

== Deaths ==
- January 16 - Charles Alphonse du Fresnoy, painter (born 1611)
- May - Pieter Jansz. Saenredam, painter (born 1597)
- July 3 - Francesco Costanzo Cattaneo, Italian painter (born 1602)
- July 14 - Aniello Falcone, Italian Baroque painter noted for his painted depictions of battle scenes (born 1600)
- July 27 - Francesco Cairo, Italian painter active in Lombardy and Piedmont (born 1607)
- August 25 - Elisabetta Sirani, Italian painter (born 1638)
- November 19 – Nicolas Poussin, painter (born 1594)
- December 19 - Gerard van Zyl, Dutch Golden Age painter of portraits and genre scenes (born 1607)
- date unknown
  - Antonio Bacci, Italian still life painter (born 1600)
  - Albert Eckhout – Dutch portrait and still life painter (born 1610)
  - Jan Sadeler II, Flemish engraver of the Sadeler family (born 1588)
  - Thomas Simon, English medalist (born c.1623)
  - Friedrich van Hulsen, Dutch printmaker and engraver (born 1580)
