= 1600 in art =

Events from the year 1600 in art.

== Events ==
- Approximate start date of the Baroque art period.

== Works ==
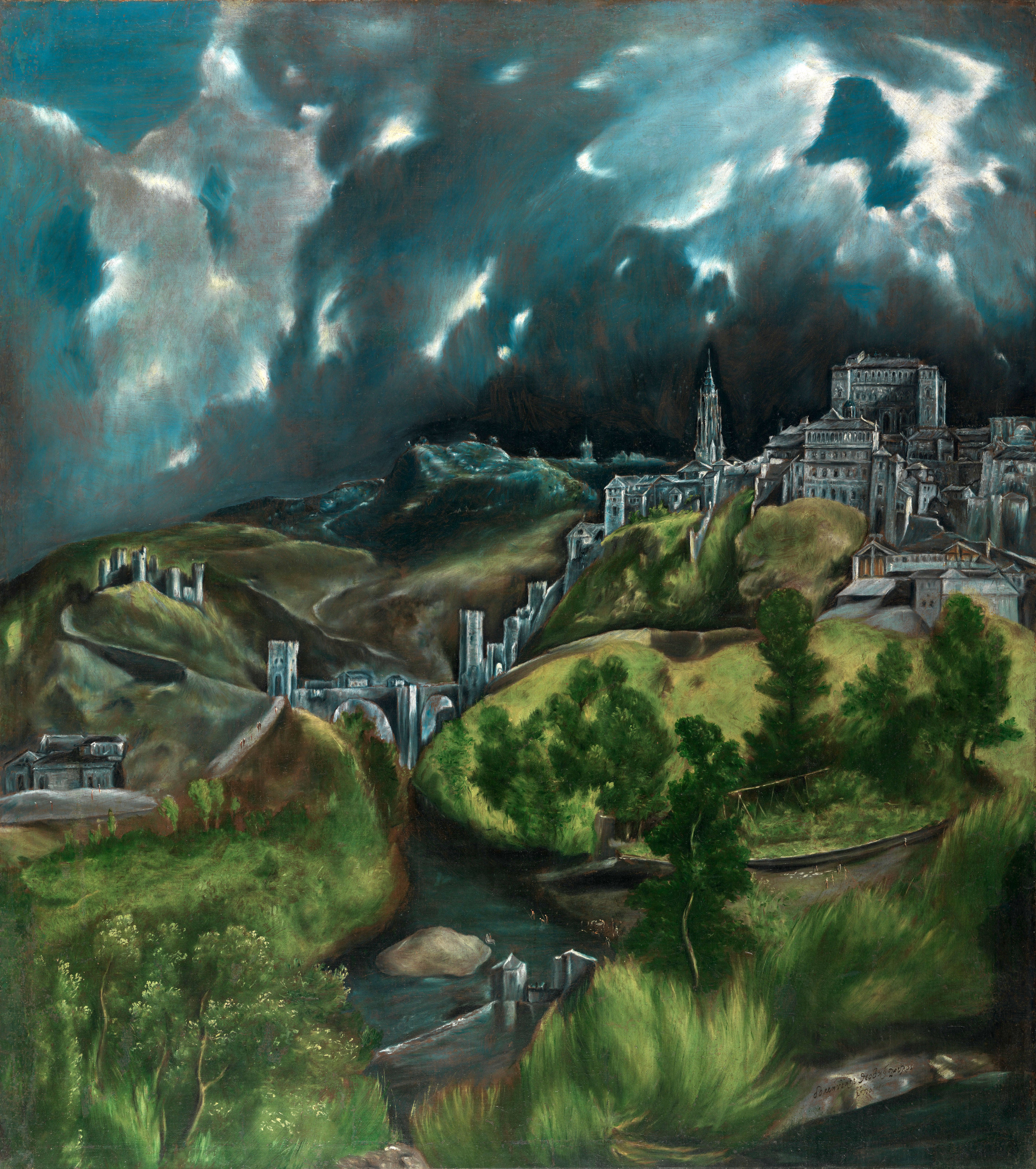
El Greco, View of Toledo

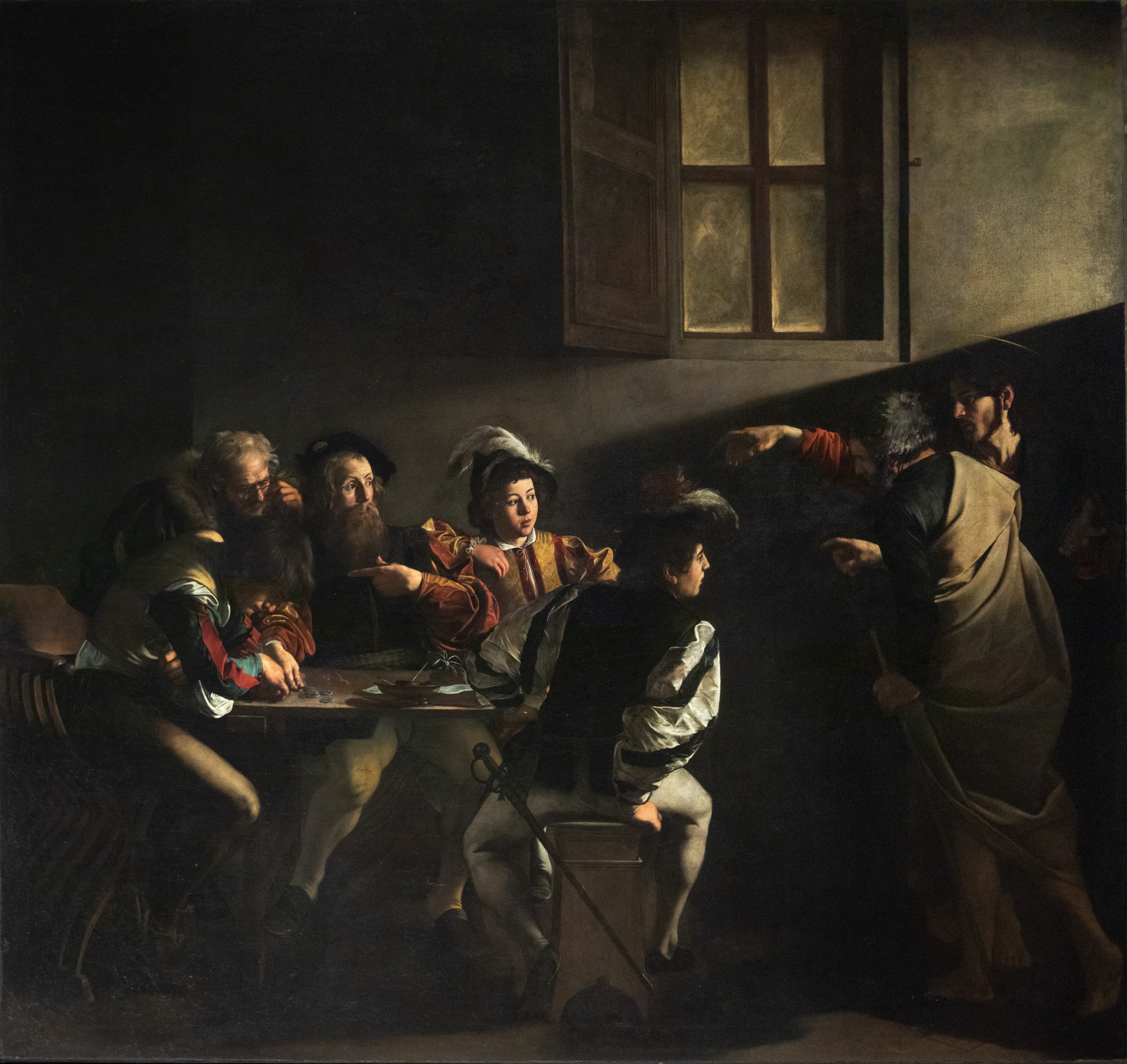
Caravaggio, The Calling of St Matthew

Caravaggio, The Martyrdom of St Matthew
- Federico Barocci - Quintilia Fischieri (approximate date)
- Caravaggio
  - The Calling of St Matthew (1599-1600)
  - The Martyrdom of Saint Matthew (1599-1600)
- El Greco
  - Christ Driving the Money Changers from the Temple
  - View of Toledo (1599-1600)
- Karel van Mander - The Continence of Scipio
- Domenico Passignano - Bathers at San Niccolò
- Robert Peake - The Procession Picture

== Births ==
- May - Andrea Vaccaro, Italian Caravaggisti painter in a tenebrist style (died 1670)
- date unknown
  - Guido Ubaldo Abbatini, Italian painter (died 1656)
  - Willem Outgertsz Akersloot, Dutch Golden Age engraver (died 1661)
  - Filippo d'Angeli, Italian painter of battle scenes with small figures (died 1660)
  - Gioacchino Assereto, Italian painter, active in Genoa (died 1649)
  - Antonio Bacci, Italian still life painter (died 1665)
  - Antonio Barbalonga, Italian painter of the Baroque period (died 1649)
  - Hans Gillisz. Bollongier, still life Dutch painter (died 1645)
  - Domenico Bruni, Italian painter, mainly active in Brescia (died 1666)
  - Bernabé de Ayala, Spanish historical painter (died 1678)
  - Jacob Duck, Dutch painter (died 1667)
  - Aniello Falcone, Italian painter noted for his depictions of battle scenes (died 1665)
  - Giovanna Garzoni, Italian painter of still-lifes of fruits, vegetables, and flowers (died 1670)
  - Jerónimo Jacinto de Espinosa, Spanish painter active in Valencia (died 1667)
  - Jean Monier, French painter (died 1656)
  - Kim Myeong-guk, Korean painter of the mid Joseon period (d. unknown)
  - Vincenzo Manenti, Italian painter who worked on the cathedral at Tivoli (died 1674)
  - Jochim Neiman, German-born traveling painter who primarily worked in Finland (died 1673)
  - Antonio Richieri, Italian painter of frescoes (date of death unknown)
  - Fray Juan Rizi, Spanish painter (died 1680)
  - Pieter van Schaeyenborgh, Dutch painter of fish still lifes (died 1657)
  - Giovanni Serodine, Italian painter in Caravaggisti and tenebrist styles (died 1631)
  - Cristoforo Serra, Italian painter who was also a militia captain in the Papal troops (died 1689)
  - Georg Pachmann, Austrian portrait painter (died 1652)
  - Pieter van Avont, Flemish painter, draughtsman and printmaker (died 1652)
  - Magdalena van de Passe, engraver and important member of the Van de Passe family of artists (died 1638)
- probable
  - Domenico Ambrogi, Italian painter from Bologna (died 1678)
  - Giovanni Battista Braccelli, Italian engraver and painter, active in Florence (died 1650)
  - Jacob Heinrich Elbfas, Livonia-born portraitist (died 1664)
  - Giuseppe Caletti, Italian painter and engraver (died 1660)
  - Giulio Cesare Fellini, Italian painter (d. unknown)
  - Pieter de Grebber, Dutch painter (died 1652/1653)
  - Philips de Marlier, Flemish Baroque painter and copyist (died 1668)
  - Pieter Anthonisz. van Groenewegen, Dutch painter and member of the Bentvueghels (died 1658)
  - Gerard Houckgeest, Dutch Delft School painter (died 1661)
  - Giovanni Battista Mainero, Italian painter from Genoa (died 1657)
  - Gerard Soest, Dutch painter, father of Gerard ter Borch (died 1681)
  - Matthias Stom, Dutch Golden Age painter (died 1649)
  - Moses van Uyttenbroeck, Dutch painter and etcher (died 1648)
  - 1600/1603: Johannes Cornelisz Verspronck, Dutch portraitist (died 1662)

== Deaths ==
- October 17 - Cornelis de Jode, cartographer and engraver (born 1568)
- date unknown
  - Cristoforo Augusta, Italian painter, pupil of Giovanni Battista Trotti (born 1550)
  - Giovanni Balducci, also called Il Cosci, Italian mannerist painter (born 1560)
  - Santi Gucci, architect and sculptor (born c.1530)
  - Diego Polo the Elder, Spanish painter (born 1560)
  - Simon Pereyns, Flemish painter who worked in Portugal, Spain, and Mexico (born 1530)
  - Jan Sadeler I, Flemish engraver of the Sadeler family (born 1550)
  - Decio Termisani, Naples-born Italian painter (born 1565)
  - Christiaen Jansz van Bieselingen, Dutch Golden Age painter (born 1558)
  - Petruccio Ubaldini, Italian calligraphist and illuminator on vellum (born 1524)
  - Giovanni Maria Verdizotti, Venetian artist and poet (born 1525)
