= 1671 in art =

Events from the year 1671 in art.

== Events ==
- The Discalced Carmelites of Vilnius build a wooden chapel to house the painting Our Lady of the Gate of Dawn.

== Works ==
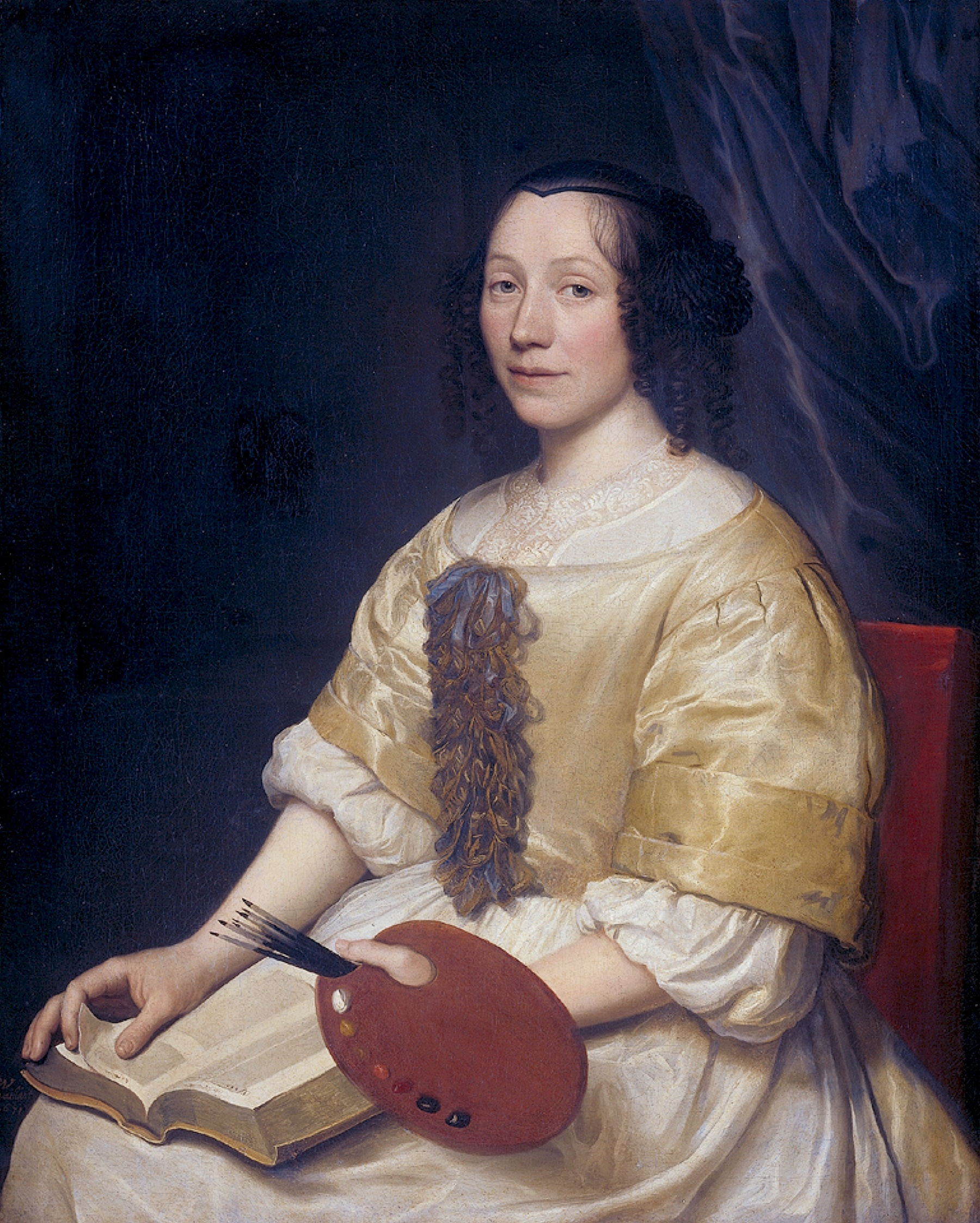
The painter Maria van Oosterwijck, by Wallerant Vaillant (1671)

- Philippe de Champaigne – Still Life with a Skull (approximate date)
- Manuel do Coyto – Christ of Buenos Aires (sculpture in Buenos Aires Metropolitan Cathedral)
- Gerard de Lairesse – Three ceiling paintings for Andries de Graeff, now at the Peace Palace in The Hague
- Gillis van Tilborgh – The Tichborne Dole

== Births ==
- January 14 – Andrea Procaccini, Italian painter for the royal family of King Philip V of Spain (died 1734)
- March 15 – Thomas Restout, French painter (died 1754)
- July 21 – Hendrick Krock, Danish history painter (died 1738)
- December 13 – Francescantonio Coratoli, Italian painter of frescoes (died 1722)
- date unknown
  - Paolo Alboni, Italian painter (died 1734)
  - Giovan Battista Caniana, Italian sculptor and architect (died 1754)
  - Donato Creti, Italian painter of the Rococo period, active mostly in Bologna (died 1749)
  - Nishikawa Sukenobu, Japanese ukiyo-e printmaker from Kyoto (died 1750)
  - Jaime Mosen Ponz, Spanish painter (died 1730)
  - Michele Rocca, Italian painter, born at Parma and practised in Rome (died 1751)

== Deaths ==
- February 11 - Nicolas Pitau, Flemish engraver and printmaker (born 1632)
- May 8 – Sébastien Bourdon, painter and engraver (born 1616)
- May 16 – Dirck van Delen, Dutch Baroque Era painter (born 1605)
- July – Adriaen Hanneman, Dutch painter best known for his portraits of the exiled British royal court (born 1603)
- July 4 – Jan Cossiers, painter (born 1600)
- November – Jan van Bijlert, Dutch painter, co-founder of the Bentvueghels (born 1597)
- date unknown
  - Alessandro Badiale, Italian painter and engraver (born 1626)
  - Jan de Bisschop, lawyer, painter and engraver (born 1628)
  - Conrad Buno, German copperplate engraver, cartographer and publisher (born 1613)
  - Francisco Camilo, Spanish painter (born 1610)
  - Theresa Maria Coriolano, Italian engraver of the Baroque period (born 1620)
  - Gaspar Dias, Portuguese painter (date of birth unknown)
  - Willem Eversdijck, Dutch portrait painter (born 1620)
  - Giacomo Antonio Fancelli, sculptor (born 1619)
  - Sokuhi Nyoitsu, Buddhist monk of the Obaku Zen sect, poet and calligrapher (born 1616)
  - Andrea Suppa, Italian painter of marine landscapes (born 1628)
