= 1652 in art =

Events from the year 1652 in art.

== Events ==
- October - Johannes Vermeer assumes control of the family's art business and inn in Delft on the death of his father, Reijnier Janszoon.
- Pietro Paolini opens an academy in Lucca based on the principle of art from nature, at which numerous artists, such as Girolamo Scaglia, Antonio Franchi, Simone del Tintore and his brother Francesco will be trained.

== Works ==
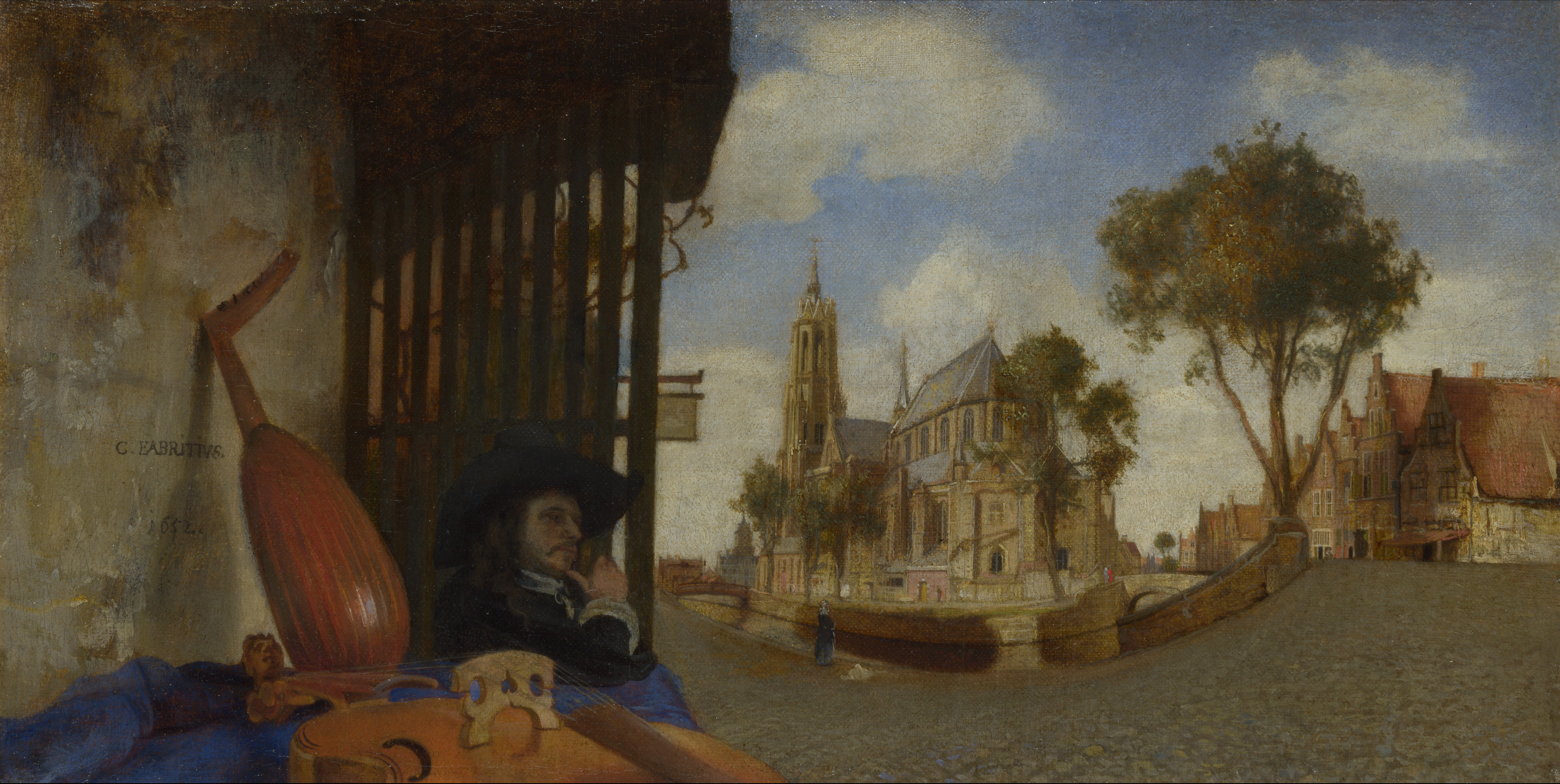
A View of Delft by Carel Fabritius

- Gian Lorenzo Bernini - Ecstasy of Saint Teresa (marble sculpture group, Santa Maria della Vittoria, Rome)
- Jan de Bray - The Banquet of Antony and Cleopatra (first version, British Royal Collection)
- Carel Fabritius - A View of Delft, painting showing use of exaggerated perspective
- Jan Lievens - Allegory of Peace (completed)
- Israel ben Mordechai - polychrome ceiling of Gwoździec Synagogue in the Polish–Lithuanian Commonwealth (original version - approximate date)
- Gerard van Honthorst - Margareta Maria de Roodere and Her Parents (approximate date)
- Rembrandt - Self-portrait (Kunsthistorisches Museum, Vienna)
- David Teniers the Younger - Flemish Kermess

== Births ==
- February 13 - Anton Domenico Gabbiani, Italian painter born in Florence (died 1726)
- April 25 - Giovanni Battista Foggini, Italian sculptor active in Florence, especially of small bronze statuary (died 1737)
- September 8 - Luisa Roldán, Spanish sculptor of the Baroque Era (died 1706)
- October 29 - Jan Wyck, Dutch painter of military subjects (died 1702)
- date unknown
  - Jan Brokoff, German sculptor (died 1718)
  - Francesco Antonio Caneti, Italian miniature painter (died 1721)
  - Hanabusa Itchō, Japanese painter, calligrapher, and haiku poet (died 1724)
  - Esteban Márquez de Velasco, Spanish Baroque painter (died 1696)
  - Jean Louis Petitot, French enamel painter (died 1730)
- probable
  - Jan van Almeloveen, Dutch painter, engraver, and draughtsman (died 1683)
  - Jan Griffier, Dutch painter, member of the Worshipful Company of Painter-Stainers (died 1718)
  - Pierre Lepautre, French ornemaniste (designer of ornament) and engraver (died 1716)
  - (born 1652/1656) Santi Prunati, Italian painter of many churches in and around Verona (died 1728)

== Deaths ==
- January - Francisco de Palacios, Spanish Baroque painter (born 1623)
- January 30 - Georges de La Tour, painter from the Duchy of Lorraine (born 1593)
- April 8 - Angelo Caroselli, Italian painter (born 1585)
- June 19 - Claes Jansz. Visscher, Dutch genre painter (born 1587)
- July 25 - Bonaventura Peeters, Flemish Baroque painter (born 1614)
- August 9 - Jan Dirksz Both, Dutch painter (born 1610/1618)
- September 2 - Jusepe de Ribera, Spanish Tenebrist painter and printmaker (died 1591)
- October 1 - Jan Asselijn, Dutch painter of landscapes and animals 1610)
- date unknown
  - Bartholomeus van Bassen, Dutch painter (born 1590)
  - Jacob Gerritsz. Cuyp, Dutch portrait and landscape painter (born 1594); and his half-brother Benjamin Gerritsz. Cuyp, also a painter (born 1612)
  - Chen Hongshou, Chinese painter of late Ming Dynasty (born 1598)
  - Georg Pachmann, Austrian portrait painter (born 1600)
  - Jørgen Ringnis, Danish woodcarver (born unknown)
  - Andries van Eertvelt, Flemish Baroque painter, primarily sea scenes (born 1590)
  - Pieter van Avont, Flemish painter, draughtsman and printmaker (born 1600)
  - Wang Duo, Chinese calligrapher and painter in Ming Dynasty (born 1592)
- probable
  - died 1652/1653: Pieter de Grebber, Dutch painter (born 1600)
  - died 1652/1658: Willem Hondius, Dutch engraver, cartographer and painter (born 1598)
