= 1721 in art =

Events from the year 1721 in art.

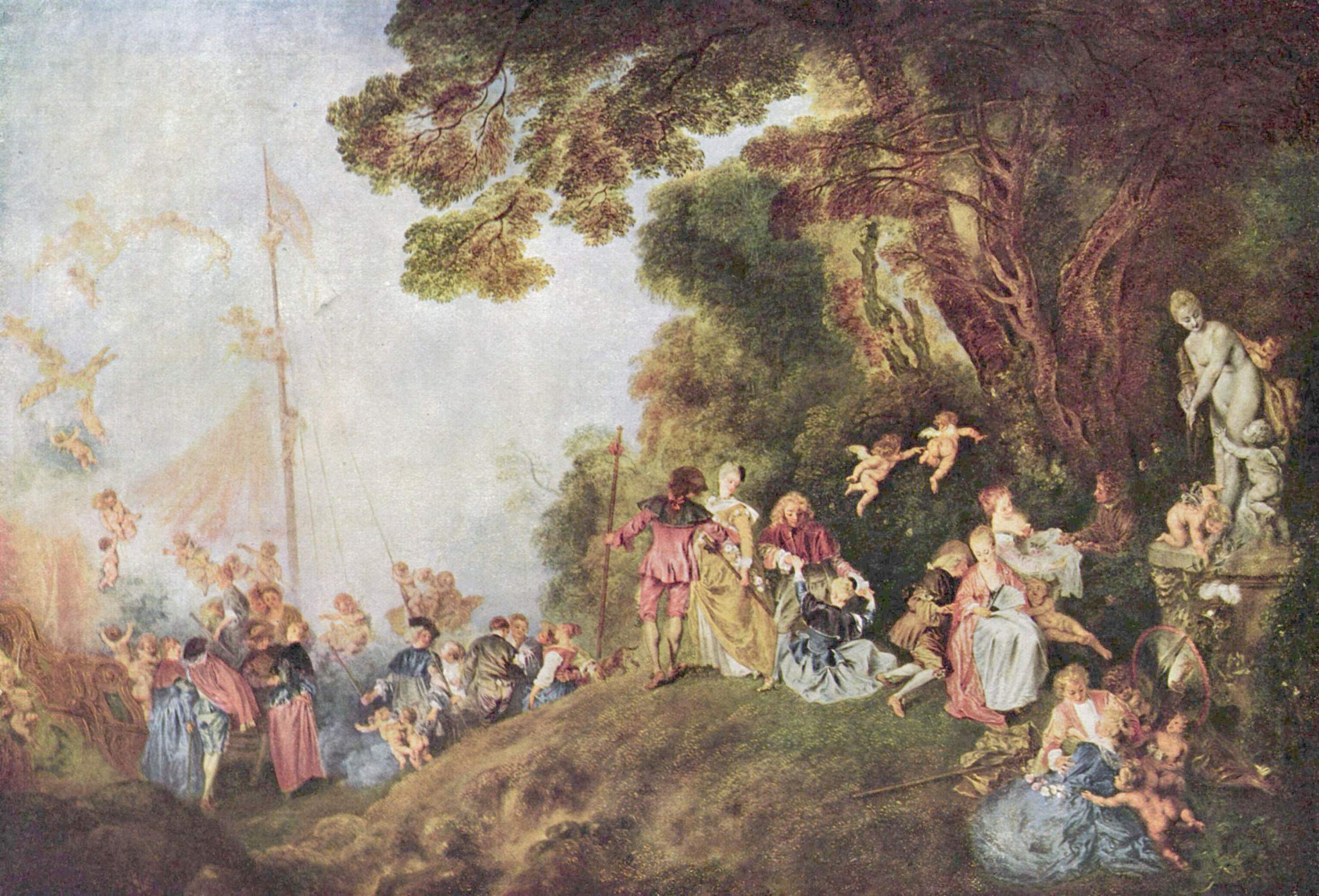
Pilgrimage to Cythera by Jean-Antoine Watteau, captures the frivolity and sensuousness of Rococo painting. (1721, Louvre)

== Events ==
- The Ascension Convent in Moscow is renovated by order of Tsar Peter I of Russia.

== Paintings ==
- Antoine Watteau – Pilgrimage to Cythera

== Births ==
- January 17 – Charles Germain de Saint Aubin, draftsman and embroidery designer to King Louis XV (died 1786)
- August 10 – Dirk van der Burg, Dutch artist, landscape painter and watercolourist (died 1773)
- date unknown
  - Francesco Albotto, Italian painter (died 1757)
  - Jean Charles Baquoy, French engraver (died 1777)
  - Charles Joseph Flipart, French painter and engraver (died 1797)
  - Charles Grignion the Elder, British engraver and draughtsman (died 1810)
  - Pietro Antonio Lorenzoni, Italian portrait painter (died 1782)

== Deaths ==
- April 20 – Louis Laguerre, French decorative painter working in England (born 1663)
- July 18 – Antoine Watteau, painter (born 1684)
- August 3 – Grinling Gibbons, English master wood carver (born 1648)
- September 3 - Benoît Audran the Elder, French engraver (born 1661)
- December 19 – Bonaventura Lamberti, Italian painter active mainly in Rome (born 1653)
- date unknown
  - Giovanni Lorenzo Bertolotti, Italian painter active in Genoa (born 1640)
  - Francesco Antonio Caneti, Italian miniature painter (born 1652)
  - Andrea dell'Asta, Italian painter (born 1673)
  - John Faber the Elder, Dutch portrait engraver active in London (born 1660)
  - Luigi Garzi, Italian painter (born 1638)
  - Giuseppe Ghezzi, Italian painter, active mainly in Rome (born 1634)
  - Nicola Malinconico, Neapolitan painter (born 1663)
  - Jose Risueño, Spanish painter who helped decorate the cupola of the church in the Carthusian monastery (born 1640)
