= 1738 in art =

Events from the year 1738 in art.

== Events ==
- Louis-François Roubiliac's sculpture of George Frederick Handel goes on display at Vauxhall Gardens in London.

== Paintings ==
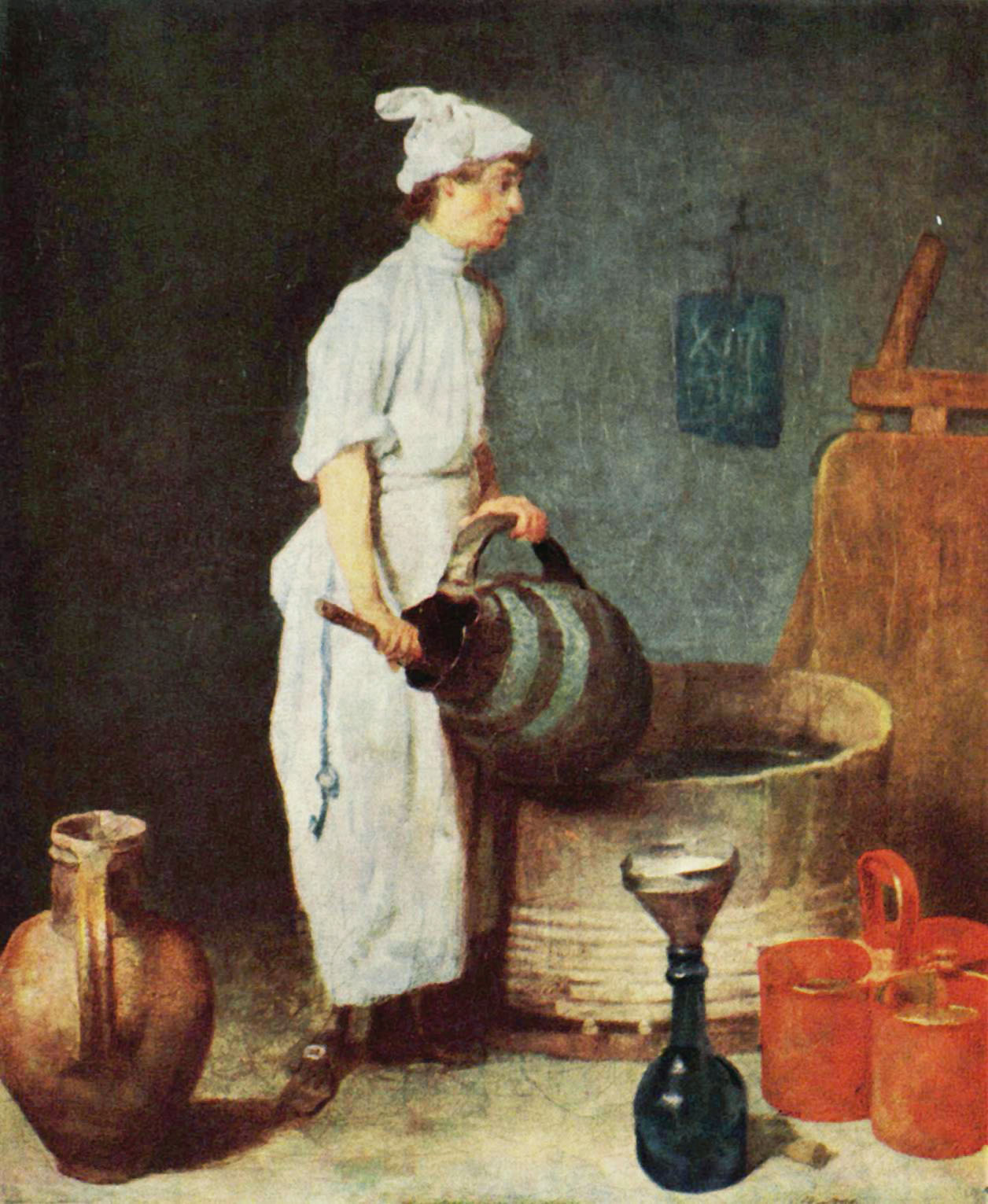
Chardin, The Wash Barrel

- Andrea Casali – Portrait of Charles Frederick
- Jean-Baptiste-Siméon Chardin – The Wash Barrel
- William Hogarth – The Strode Family
- Louis de Silvestre – Portrait of the Princess Maria Amalia of Saxony in Polish costume
- Jean-Baptiste van Loo – Portrait of William Murray

== Births ==
- January 3 – Johann Friedrich Bause, German engraver (died 1814)
- June 4 – George III of the United Kingdom, patron of the arts and collector (died 1820)
- June 10 – Hubert Maurer, Austrian painter of portraits and religious themes (died 1818)
- July 3 – John Singleton Copley, American-born painter active in the Thirteen Colonies and England (died 1815)
- July William Wynne Ryland, English engraver (died 1783)
- August 6 – Johann Balzer, Czech etcher and engraver (died 1799)
- October 10 – Benjamin West, American-born painter who specialized in history painting (died 1820)
- December 20 – Claude Michel, French sculptor in the Rococo style (died 1814)
- date unknown
  - William Cochran, Scottish portrait painter both in oil and miniature (died 1785)
  - Antoine Raspal, French painter (died 1811)
  - Camillo Tinti, Italian painter (died unknown)
  - Fredrika Eleonora von Düben, Swedish textile artist, member of the Royal Swedish Academy of Arts (died 1808)

== Deaths ==
- January 20 – Francesco Galli Bibiena, Italian architect/designer/painter (born 1659)
- January 27 – Alessandro Marchesini, Italian painter of allegories with small figures (born 1664)
- February 16 – Carel de Moor, Dutch etcher and painter (born 1655)
- August 9 – Pierre Drevet, French portrait engraver (born 1663)
- October 5 – Antonio Amorosi, Italian painter, active in Ascoli Piceno and Rome (born 1660)
- November – Giovanni Enrico Vaymer, Italian portrait painter (born 1665)
- November 18 – Hendrick Krock, Danish history painter (born 1671)

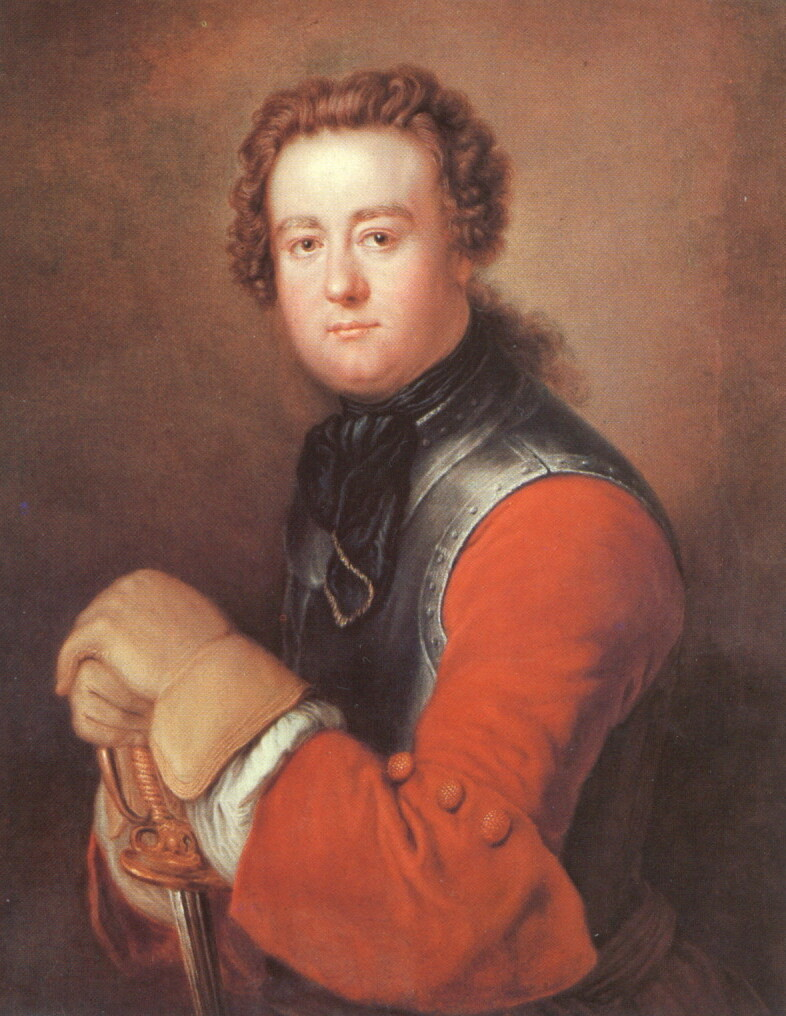
Officer, architect and painter Georg Wenzeslaus von Knobelsdorff by Antoine Pesne, 1738

- date unknown
  - Felice Cappelletti, Italian painter of the late-Baroque period active in Verona (born 1698)
  - Giovanni Battista Cassana, Italian painter of fruit, flowers, and still-life (born 1668)
  - Edme Jeaurat, French engraver (born 1688)
  - Carlo Antonio Tavella, Italian painter of landscapes (born 1668)
