= Decio =

Decio is both a given name and a surname. Notable people with the name include:

== Given name ==
- Decio Azzolini (seniore) (1549–1587), Italian Roman Catholic cardinal
- Decio Carafa (1556–1626), Italian Archbishop
- Decio Termisani (1565–1600), Italian painter
- Decio Caracciolo Rosso (died 1613), Italian Roman Catholic prelate
- Decio Azzolino (1623–1689), Italian Catholic Cardinal
- Décio Villares (1851–1931), Brazilian artist and sculptor
- Decio Vinciguerra (1856–1934), Italian physician and ichthyologist
- Decio Pavani (1891-unknown), Italian gymnast
- Decio Klettenberg (1902-unknown), Brazilian rower
- Decio Scuri (1905–1980), Italian basketball coach and administrator
- Decio Trovati (1906-unknown), Italian hockey player
- Décio Esteves (1927–2000), Brazilian football manager and midfielder
- Décio Pignatari (1927–2012), Brazilian poet and essayist
- Décio de Azevedo (born 1939), Brazilian volleyball player
- Décio (footballer) (1941–2000), full name Décio Randazzo Teixeira, Brazilian football defender
- Decio López (born 1946), Colombian football defender
- Décio Sá (1970–2012), Brazilian political journalist

== Surname ==
- Filippo Decio (1454–1535), Italian jurist

== Other uses ==
- Estádio Décio Vitta, Brazilian football stadium in Americana, São Paulo
