= Fellini (disambiguation) =

Federico Fellini (1920–1993) was an Italian film director and screenwriter.

Fellini may also refer to:

== People ==
- Giulio Cesare Fellini (born c. 1600), Italian painter
- Maddalena Fellini (1929–2004), Italian actress and writer
- Riccardo Fellini (1921–1991), Italian film actor

== Film ==
- Fellini: A Director's Notebook, an Italian documentary
- Fellini: I'm a Born Liar, a 2002 French documentary

== Other uses ==
- Federico Fellini: His Life and Work, a book by Tullio Kezich originally published as Fellini
- Felini (tribe)
- Fellini (band), a Brazilian rock band
- 5150 Fellini, a minor planet

== See also ==
- Federico Fellini International Airport
