= Alboni =

Alboni is the surname of:

- Marietta Alboni (1826–1894), Italian contralto opera singer
- Paolo Alboni (1671–1734), Italian painter
- Edgardo Alboni (1919–2015), Italian partisan and politician
- Roberto Alboni (1963-), Italian politician
