= Charlatan (disambiguation) =

A charlatan is a trickster or con artist.

Charlatan may also refer to:

== Film and television ==
- The Charlatan (1917 film), a Hungarian film by Michael Curtiz
- The Charlatan (1929 film), a Universal Pictures film by George Melford
- Charlatan (2020 film), a film by Agnieszka Holland
- O Tsarlatanos or The Charlatan, a 1973 Greek film starring Thanasis Veggos

== Music ==
- The Charlatan (operetta), an 1898 operetta by John Philip Sousa
- The Charlatans (American band), a psychedelic rock band in the 1960s
  - The Charlatans (1969 album), an album by the American band The Charlatans
- The Charlatans (English band), an alternative rock band active since 1989
  - The Charlatans (1995 album), an album by the English band The Charlatans
- Šarlatán, a 1936 opera by Pavel Haas
- Charlatan (album), a 2011 album by Victorian Halls
- "Charlatan", a 2008 song by Four Letter Lie from What a Terrible Thing to Say
- "Charlatan", a 2011 song by Howling Bells from The Loudest Engine

== Books ==
- The Charlatan, an 1895 book by Robert Williams Buchanan and Henry Murray
- The Charlatan, a 1934 book by Sydney Horler
- The Charlatan, a 2002 book by Derek Walcott
- Charlatan: America's Most Dangerous Huckster, the Man Who Pursued Him, and the Age of Flimflam, a 2008 book by Pope Brock about John R. Brinkley

== Other uses ==
- The Charlatan (Mei), a 1656 painting by Bernardino Mei
- The Charlatan (student newspaper), a student newspaper at Carleton University in Ontario, Canada
