= 1722 in art =

Events from the year 1722 in art.

== Events ==
- Foundation of the first public theatre in Denmark, Lille Grönnegade.

== Paintings ==
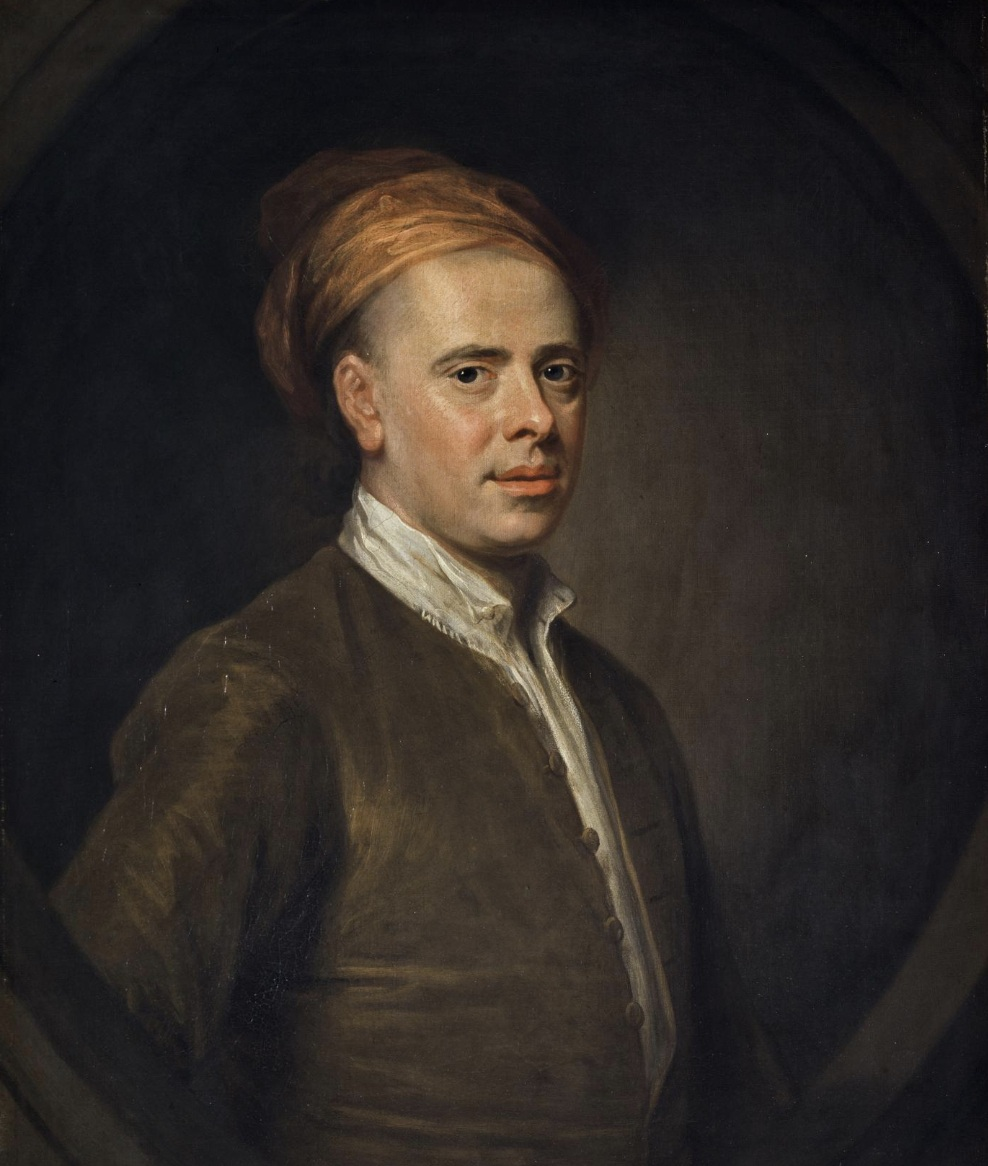
Allan Ramsay by William Aikman

- William Aikman – Portrait of the Scottish poet Allan Ramsay
- William Kent – Ceiling of Cupola Room, Kensington Palace
- Sir Godfrey Kneller – Portrait of Thomas Coningsby and his daughters Margaret and Frances
- Nicolas Lancret – La Fête dans un Bois
- Tiepolo – The Martyrdom of St. Bartholomew
- Maria Verelst – The Dowager Duchess of Marlborough with Lady Diana Spencer (approximate date)

== Births ==
- March 6 – Johann Christian Brand, Austrian painter (died 1795)
- May 25 - Anton Čebej – Slovenian painter (d. c. 1774)
- July 16 – Joseph Wilton, English sculptor and a founding member of the Royal Academy (died 1803)
- August 12 – Giuseppe Baldrighi, Italian painter (died 1803)
- September 2 – Vigilius Eriksen, Danish painter and royal portraitist (died 1782)
- October 3 – Johann Heinrich Tischbein, member of the Tischbein family of German painters (died 1789)
- November 30 – Theodore Gardelle, painter and enameller (died 1761)
- date unknown
  - Francesco Battaglioli, Italian painter of veduta and capriccios (died 1796)
  - Dominic Serres "the Elder", French-born marine painter (died 1793)

== Deaths ==
- January 7 – Antoine Coypel, French painter (born 1661)
- March 12 – Christian Berentz, German artist (born 1658)
- April 12 - Antonio Zanchi, Italian painter of canvases for churches in Venice (born 1631)
- May 4 – Claude Gillot, French painter, engraver, book illustrator, metal worker, and theatrical designer (born 1673)
- May 19 – Jan Karel Donatus van Beecq, Dutch painter (born 1638)
- May 23 - Pierre Aveline, French engraver, print-publisher and print-seller (born 1656)
- June 10 – Francescantonio Coratoli, Italian painter of frescoes (born 1671)
- August 7 – Johann Georg Beck, German engraver (born 1676)
- November 12 – Adriaen van der Werff, Dutch painter of portraits and erotic, devotional and mythological scenes (born 1659)
- November 21 - Sebastiaen van Aken, Flemish historical painter (born 1648)
- date unknown
  - Marziale Carpinoni, Italian painter (born c.1644)
  - Filippo Tancredi, Italian painter of church frescoes (born 1655)
  - Ma Yuanyu, Chinese painter during the Qing Dynasty (born c.1669)
