= 1656 in art =

Events from the year 1656 in art.

== Events ==
- March–December – Naples Plague kills many artists there.
- Rembrandt, facing bankruptcy, is forced to arrange sale of most of his paintings and collection of antiquities.

== Works ==
Velázquez – Las Meninas

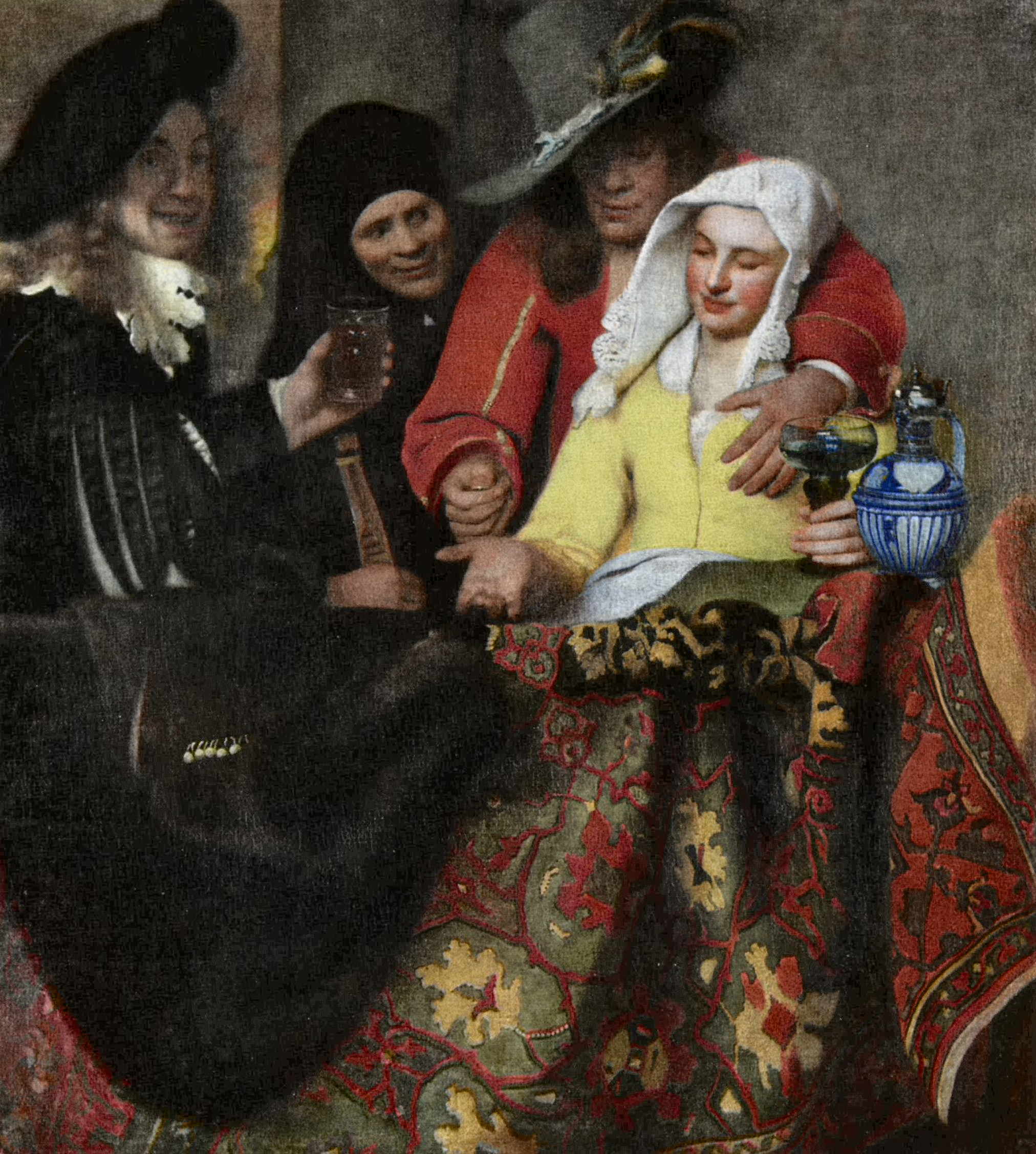
Vermeer – The Procuress. The figure on the left has been called Vermeer's self-portrait.

- Bernardino Mei – The Charlatan
- Rembrandt – Jacob Blessing the Sons of Joseph
- Diego Velázquez – Las Meninas (Museo del Prado, Madrid)
- Jan Vermeer – The Procuress (approximate date; Gemäldegalerie, Dresden)

== Births ==
- April 9 – Francesco Trevisani, Italian painter of frescoes (died 1746)
- April 25 – Giovanni Antonio Burrini, Bolognese painter in late-Baroque or Rococo style (died 1727)
- July 15 – Massimiliano Soldani Benzi, Italian sculptor and medallist (died 1740)
- August 18 – Ferdinando Galli Bibiena, Italian architect, designer, painter and author (died 1743)
- October 10 – Nicolas de Largillière, French painter (died 1746)
- November – Jacob de Heusch, Dutch painter (died 1701)
- December 11 – Johann Michael Rottmayr, Austrian painter (died 1730)
- date unknown
  - Pierre Aveline, French engraver, print-publisher and print-seller (died 1722)
  - François Barois, French sculptor (died 1726)
  - Simone Brentana, Italian painter of the Baroque period, active in Verona (died 1742)
  - Heinrich Charasky, Hungarian sculptor (died 1710)
  - José de Cieza, Spanish painter (died 1692)
  - Louis de Deyster, Flemish painter of churches and maker of musical instruments (died 1711)
  - Sebastiano Galeotti, peripatetic Italian painter of the late-Baroque period (died 1746)
  - Maria Oriana Galli-Bibiena, Italian painter (died 1749)
  - Willem Wissing, Dutch portrait artist (died 1687)

== Deaths ==
- April 27
  - Gerard van Honthorst, Dutch painter of Utrecht (born 1592)
  - Jan van Goyen, Dutch landscape painter (born 1596)
- May 17 - Dirck Hals, Dutch painter of festivals and ballroom scenes (born 1591)
- July 12 - Giovanni Giacomo Barbelli, Italian painter, active in Brescia (born 1604)
- August - Salomon Koninck, Dutch painter of genre scenes, portraits and an engraver (born 1609)
- November 12 - Hendrick van Anthonissen, Dutch marine painter (born 1605)
- December 20 - David Beck, Dutch portrait painter (born 1621)
- December 28 - Laurent de La Hyre, French painter (born 1606)
- date unknown
  - Guido Ubaldo Abbatini, Italian painter (born 1600)
  - Jacopo Barbello, Italian painter (born 1590)
  - Didier Barra, French Renaissance painter (born 1590)
  - Gregorio Bausá, Spanish painter (born 1590)
  - Remigio Cantagallina, Italian etcher (born 1582)
  - Francisco Collantes, Spanish painter (born 1599)
  - Maria de Abarca, Spanish painter of large and miniature portraits (born unknown)
  - Francesco Francanzano, Italian painter (born 1612; executed for inciting rebellion)
  - Francisco Herrera the Elder, Spanish painter and founder of the Seville school for the arts (born 1576)
  - Jean Monier, French painter (born 1600)
- victims of Naples Plague
  - Bernardo Cavallino, Italian painter working in Naples (born 1616)
  - Massimo Stanzione, Italian Caravaggisti painter of frescoes (born 1586)
- probable
  - Luigi Miradori, Italian painter, active mainly in Cremona (born 1600/1610)
  - Harmen Steenwijck, Dutch painter of still lifes, notably of fruit (born 1612)
- possible - Artemisia Gentileschi, Italian painter (born 1593)
