= 1668 in art =

Events from the year 1668 in art.

== Events ==
- The Sheldonian Theatre in Oxford is completed, to a design by Sir Christopher Wren with ceiling paintings by Robert Streater.

== Works ==
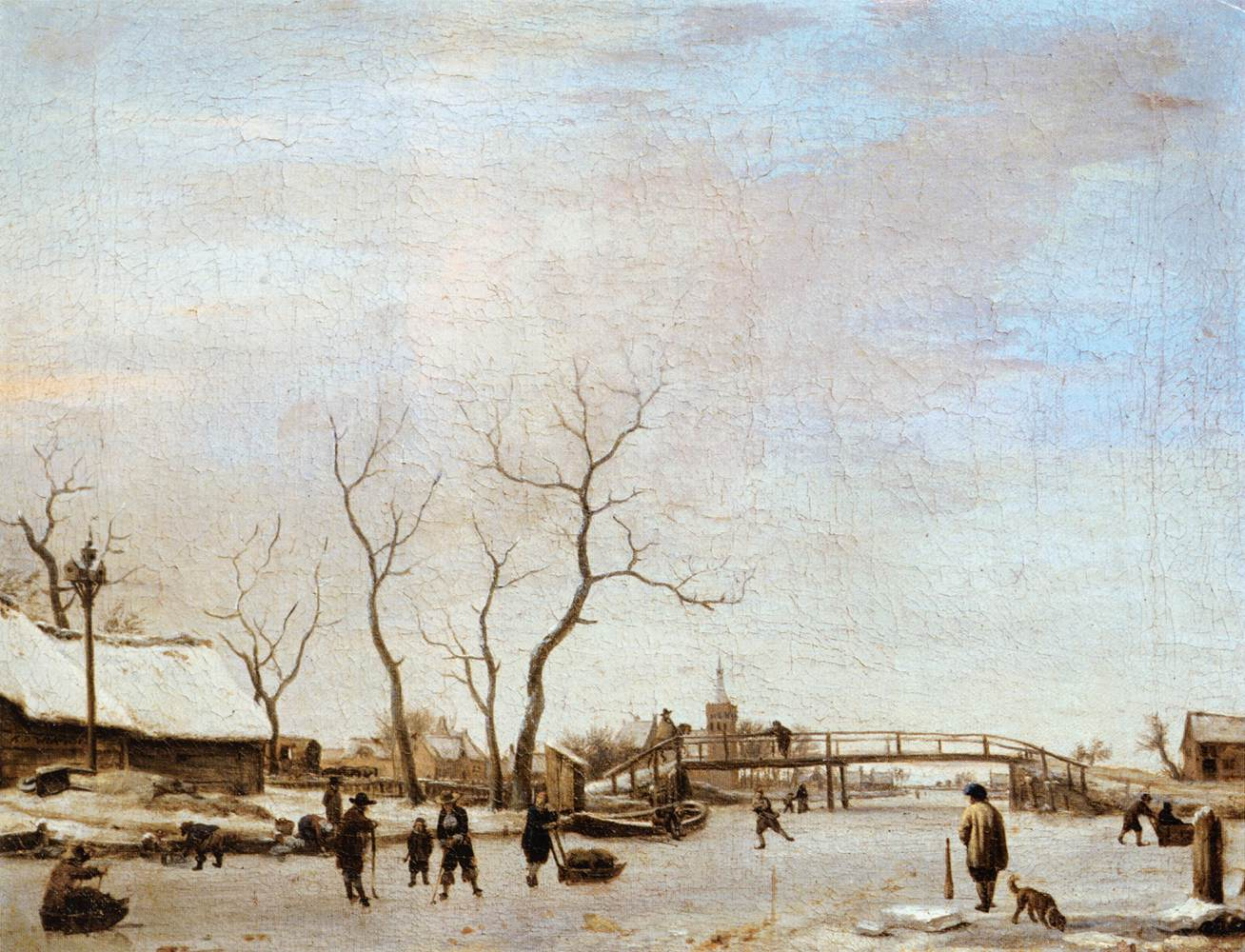
van de Velde – Frozen Canal with Skaters and Hockey Players, Musée du Louvre

- Viviano Codazzi and Filippo Lauri – The Bernini Arsenal at Civitavecchia
- Jan de Bray – The artist and his wife as Ulysses and Penelope
- Jean Baptiste Dieussart – lead statues Amor Dei and Amor Patriae, Riddarhuset, Stockholm
- Gerard de Lairesse – Allegory of the Five Senses
- Charles Le Brun
  - La Colère
  - Equestrian portrait of Louis XIV
- Adriaen van de Velde – Frozen Canal with Skaters and Hockey Players
- Jan Vermeer
  - The Astronomer
  - The Art of Painting (probably completed at or by this date)

== Births ==
- date unknown
  - Giovanni Battista Cassana, Italian painter of fruit, flowers, and still-life (died 1738)
  - Étienne-Jehandier Desrochers, French engraver (died 1741)
  - Yun Tusŏ, Korean painter and scholar of the Joseon period (died 1715)
  - Jan Griffier II, English painter (died 1750)
  - Clemente Ruta, Italian painter specializing in landscapes with pen and watercolor (died 1767)
  - Francesco Maria Schiaffino, Italian sculptor (died 1763)
  - Alessandro Specchi, Italian architect and engraver (died 1729)
  - Carlo Antonio Tavella, Italian painter of landscapes (died 1738)
  - Giuseppe Tonelli, Italian painter of frescoes and quadratura (died 1732)
  - Theodor van Pee, Dutch painter (died 1746)
  - Domenico Maria Viani, Italian painter of churches, born in Bologna (died 1711)
  - Peter Schubart von Ehrenberg, painter and stage designer active in Vienna (d. unknown)
- probable – Giacomo Antonio Arland, Italian painter of the Baroque period (died 1743)

== Deaths ==
- February 8 – Alessandro Tiarini, Italian Baroque painter of frescoes, façade decorations, and altarpieces (born 1557)
- April 21 – Jan Boeckhorst, German-born Flemish Baroque painter (born 1604)
- May 19 – Philips Wouwerman, Dutch painter (born 1619)
- August 23 – Artus Quellinus the Elder, Flemish sculptor (born 1609)
- September – Jan Miense Molenaer, Dutch genre painter (born 1610)
- September 4 - Titus van Rijn, son and model of Rembrandt (born 1641)
- date unknown
  - Benito Manuel Agüero, Spanish painter of the Baroque period (born 1624)
  - Giulio Benso, Genovese painter of the early Baroque (born 1592)
  - Giovanni Battista Bolognini, Italian painter and engraver of the Baroque (born 1611)
  - Philips de Marlier, Flemish Baroque painter and copyist (born 1600)
  - Jan Goedart, Dutch painter famous for his illustrations of insects (born 1620)
  - Antonio Travi, deaf Italian landscape painter (born 1613)
