= Frymburk =

- Market town
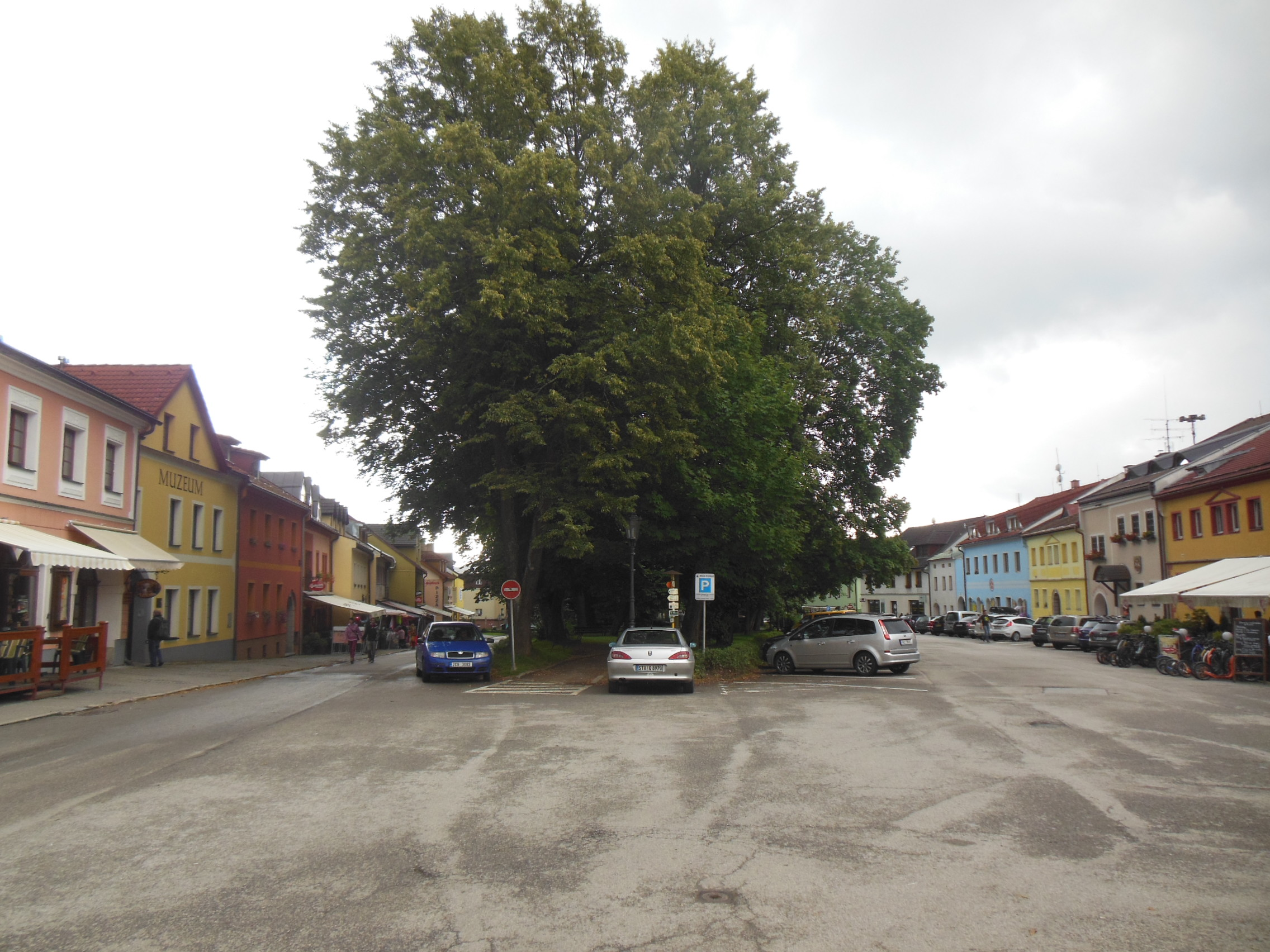
- The square

- Flag Coat of arms

- Location in the Czech Republic
- Coordinates: 48°39′40″N 14°9′56″E
- Country: Czech Republic
- Region: South Bohemian Region
- District: Český Krumlov
- First mentioned: 1277

Area
  - Total: 54.91 km^{2} (21.20 sq mi)
- Elevation: 708 m (2,323 ft)

Population (2026-01-01)
  - Total: 1,347
  - Density: 24.53/km^{2} (63.54/sq mi)
- Time zone: UTC+1 (CET)
  - Summer (DST): UTC+2 (CEST)
- Postal code: 382 79
- Website: www.frymburk.info

Frymburk (Czech pronunciation: [ˈfrɪmburk]; German: Friedberg) is a market town in Český Krumlov District in the South Bohemian Region of the Czech Republic. It has about 1,300 inhabitants. The municipality is a popular summer resort.

== Administrative division ==
Frymburk consists of four municipal parts (in brackets population according to the 2021 census):

- Frymburk (1,101)
- Blatná (26)
- Kovářov (28)
- Milná (71)

== Etymology ==
The initial German name of the local castle and later the settlement was Frideburk. The name was derived from the Middle High German words vride ('peace', 'security', 'protection') and burk ('castle'), referring to a castle with a protective function. The German form of the name fluctuated between the endings -burg and -berg, until it settled on Friedberg in the 16th century. The Czech name Frymburk was created by transcription of the German name.

== Geography ==
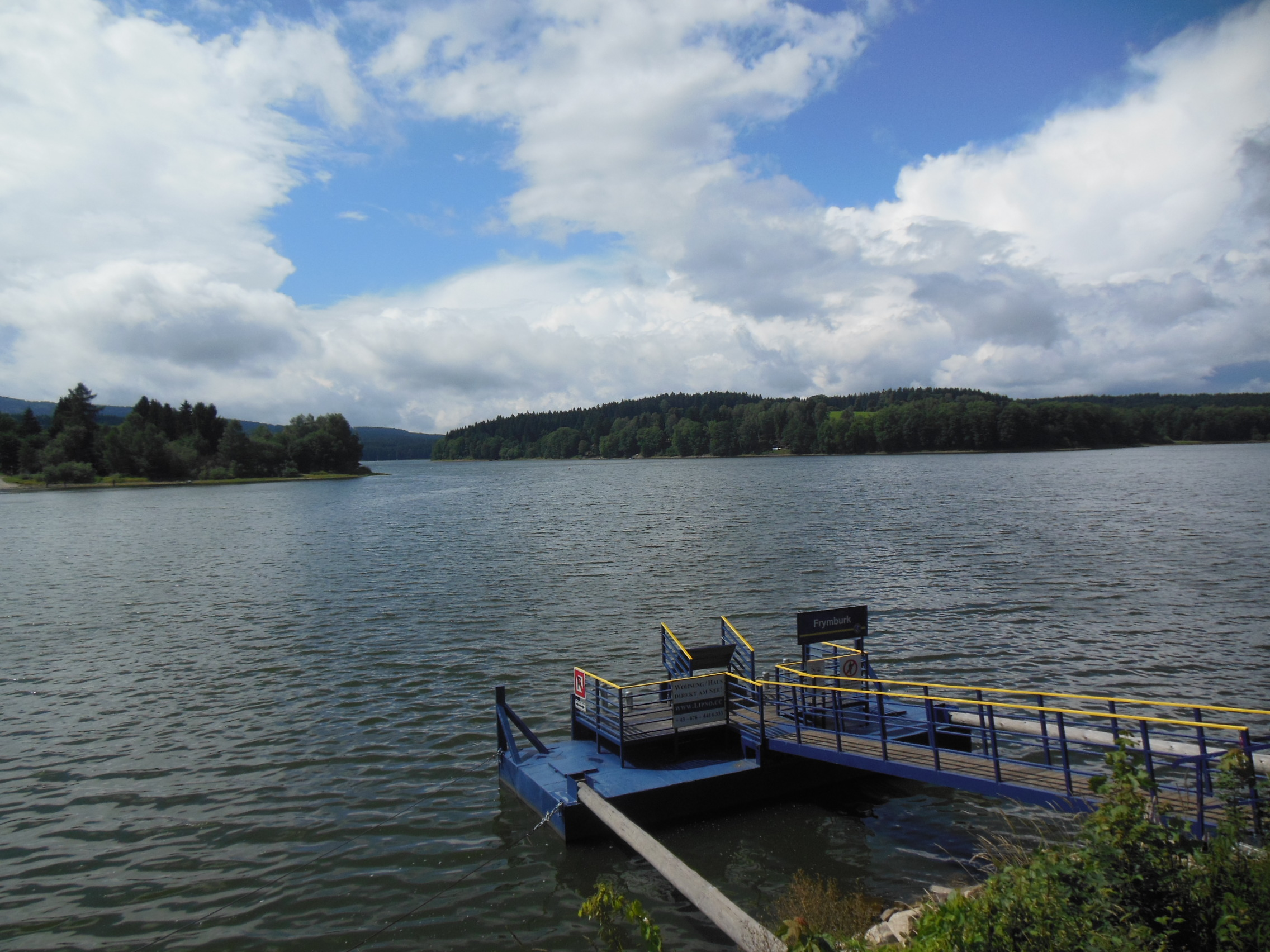
Small wharf on the Lipno Reservoir

Frymburk is located about 20 kilometres (12 mi) southwest of Český Krumlov and 40 km (25 mi) southwest of České Budějovice. The municipal territory briefly borders Austria in the west. It lies on the border between the Bohemian Forest Foothills and Bohemian Forest. The highest point is a contour line on the mountain Kaliště at 988 m (3,241 ft) above sea level. The built-up area is situated on the left shore of the Lipno Reservoir.

== History ==
The first mention of a castle in Frymburk's area is from 1198. The first written mention of the settlement is from 1270. Until 1302, it belonged to the Vítkovci lords of Český Krumlov, and after their extinction it was acquired by the Rosenberg family. It 1379, it was first referred to as a town.

From the 16th century on, Frymburk had its own brewery. In 1598, Frymburk had already 118 houses. In 1620, it was acquired by the Lords of Bucquoy. During the Thirty Years' War, the town was destroyed and burnt down by Swedish troops. Another disaster occurred in 1856 when a fire destroyed the town square and 54 houses. The town was relatively progressive, as could be seen by the installation of streets lights as early as 1881 and the introduction of a telegraph station in 1884.

In 1918, Frymburk became part of the newly established Czechoslovakia, and its population had German majority. In 1938, it was annexed to Germany. After World War II, the German population was expelled and Frymburk was resettled by Czechs, Slovaks, Romanians and Volhynian Czechs.

The most significant change at Frymburk occurred in 1959 when the Lipno Reservoir was built and it became a recreation area.

== Demographics ==
Historical population

Year	Pop.	±%
1869	2,648	—
1880	2,843	+7.4%
1890	2,850	+0.2%
1900	2,876	+0.9%
1910	2,938	+2.2%

Year	Pop.	±%
1921	2,751	−6.4%
1930	2,653	−3.6%
1950	764	−71.2%
1961	922	+20.7%
1970	951	+3.1%

Year	Pop.	±%
1980	1,099	+15.6%
1991	1,289	+17.3%
2001	1,319	+2.3%
2011	1,339	+1.5%
2021	1,226	−8.4%

Source: Censuses

== Transport ==
There are no railways or major roads passing through the municipality.

== Sights ==
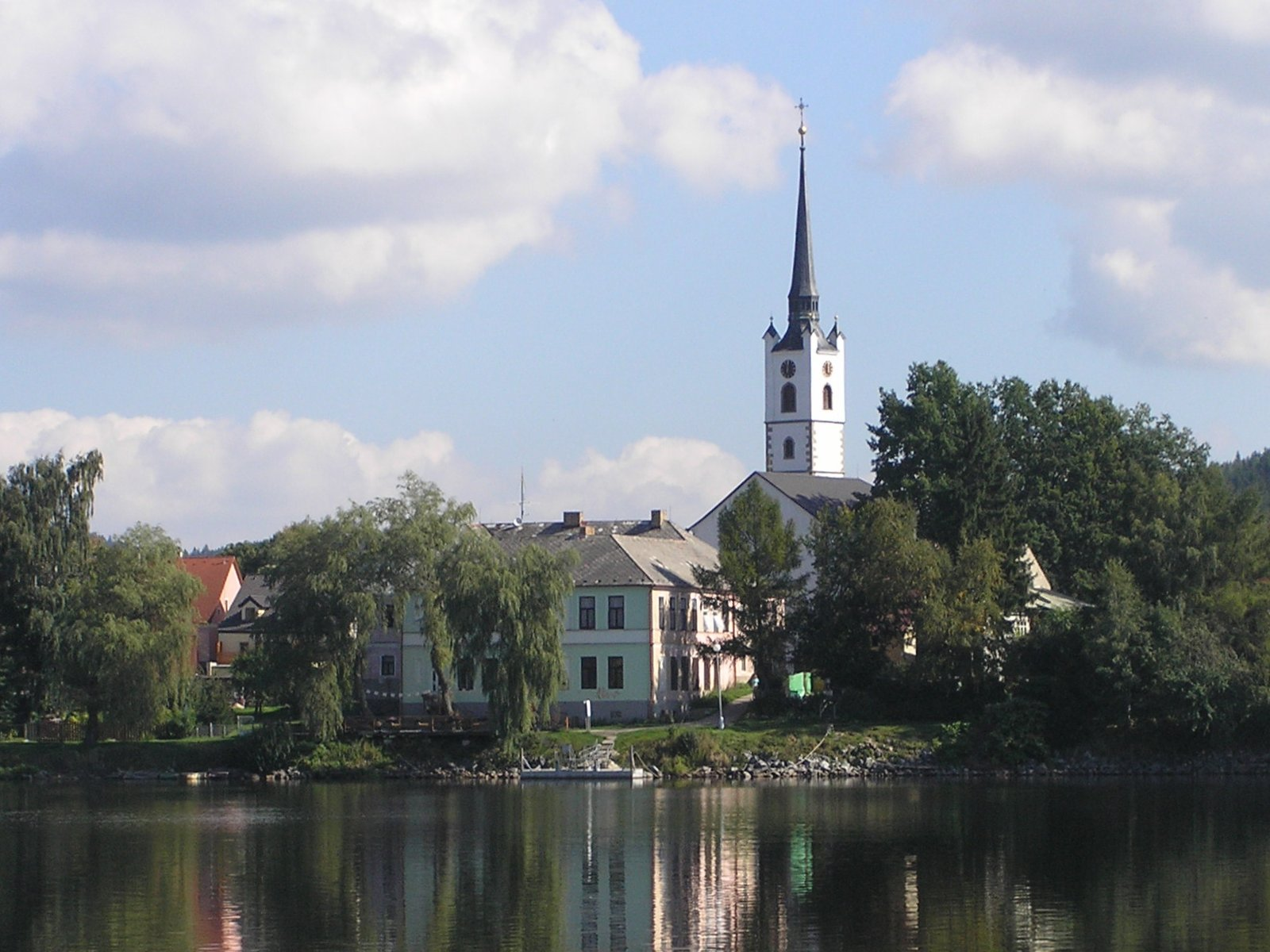
Church of Saint Bartholomew

The main landmark of Frymburk is the Church of Saint Bartholomew. It was built in 1277. In 1530, it was rebuilt in the late Gothic style and had to be renovated from 1649 to 1652 due to the Swedish attack. The tower was rebuilt in 1870. The interior of the church is in the Baroque style.

Frymburk's central square used to be the market square and was turned into a park after the great fire of 1856. Since the late 16th and early 17th century, an artificial stream fed from the stream Podhorský potok flows through the square. While the two streams were linked by a canal, the water is now led through a hose. On the square there is a well, which is presumed to date back to 1676 and is being fed from the stream. Furthermore, there is a pillory made of stone of about 5 m height with the inscription "1651". It replaced a wooden pillory that had been destroyed by the Swedes. The most obvious sight in the square though is the monument for Adalbert Stifter, who frequently used to visit Frymburk because of his lover Fanny Greipl.

== Notable people ==
- Georg Pachmann (c. 1600 – 1652), Austrian painter
- Martin Dobrizhoffer (1717–1791), Austrian missionary and writer
- Simon Sechter (1788–1867), Austrian music theorist and composer
