= Martin Dobrizhoffer =

Austrian missionary and writer (1717-1791)

Martin Dobrizhoffer (7 September 1717 – 17 July 1791) was an Austrian Roman Catholic missionary and writer.

== Biography ==
Dobrizhoffer was born in Frymburk (Friedberg), Bohemia. He joined the Jesuits in 1736, and in 1749 proceeded to Paraguay, where for eighteen years he worked devotedly first among the Guaranis, and then among the Abipones. Returning to Europe, on the expulsion of the Jesuits from South America, he settled at Vienna, obtained the friendship of Maria Theresa, survived the suppression of his order, and wrote the history of his mission. He died in Vienna in 1791.

== Book ==
The book on which his claim to fame rests, An Account of the Abipones, an Equestrian People of Paraguay was found in Vienna in 1784 in the author's own Latin, and in a German translation by Professor Kreil of the University of Pest. Of its contents some idea may be obtained from its extended title:

Historia de Abiponibus, equestri bellicosaque Paraquariae natione, locupletata copiosis barbarorum gentium, urbium, fluminum, ferarum, amphibiorum, insectorum, serpentium praecipuorum, piscium, avium, arborum, plantarum aliarumque ejusdem provinciae proprietatum observationibus

— Dobrizhoffer's title
Translation:

History of the Abipones, an equestrian and warlike nation of Paraguay, enriched with abundant observations of the barbarian peoples, cities, rivers, wild animals, amphibians, insects, principal serpents, fish, birds, trees, plants, and other properties of the same province.

— English translation

The work, published in three volumes, London, 1822, there appeared in London, an anonymous English translation sometimes ascribed to Southey, but really the work of Sara Coleridge, who had undertaken the task to defray the college expenses of one of her brothers. A delicate compliment was paid to the translator by Southey in the third canto of his A Tale of Paraguay, the story of which was derived from the pages of Dobrizhoffer's narrative:

“	And if he could in Merlin’s glass have seen By whom his tomes to speak our tongue were taught, The old man would have felt as pleased, I ween, As when he won the ear of that great Empress Queen.”

Southey did, however, write a 36-page article about the topic in the January 1822 edition of the Quarterly Review, pp. 277–324.

== Early map of Paraguay ==
Published in Vienna, 1780, "Mappa Paraquariae", one of the most important early maps of the region, engraved by Franz Assner.
