= Esteban Márquez de Velasco =

Spanish painter

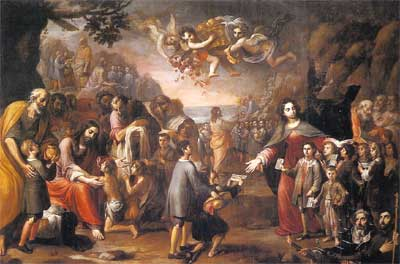
Christ and the Virgin as protectors of the youth, by Esteban Márquez de Velasco, University of Seville auditorium, from the refectory of the College of San Telmo, dedicated to the training of future navigators, 1693

Esteban Márquez de Velasco (1652–1696) was a Spanish Baroque painter.

== Biography ==
Márquez de Velasco was born in Puebla de Guzmán (Huelva). He moved at an early age to Seville with his uncle Fernando Márquez, at that time an unknown painter, with whom he worked until 1672. His works show a strong dependence on the known art of Bartolomé Esteban Murillo, who was very popular at the time. He most likely worked in one of Murillo's workshops, which produced many works.

== Works ==
The signed and dated works, from which it has been possible to set his style, however, are rare and mostly date from late in his life:

- Lactation of Saint Dominic, dated 1693, preserved in the parish of Santa Maria de las Nieves ("Church of Saint Mary of the Snows")
- Christ and the Virgin as protectors of the youth, dated 1694, large oil painting from the College of San Telmo in Seville, where he was installed in the refectory, now preserved in the auditorium of the University of Seville.
- Also signed were four stories of a holy martyr, present whereabouts unknown
- St. Augustine and St. Joseph with the Child, Museum of Fine Arts of Seville
- A series of the Life of St. Francis of Assisi, preserved in Guadalajara (Mexico)
- Life of the Virgin, from the convent of the Trinity in Seville,
- The Dormition of the Virgin, late 1600s. Art Gallery of Ontario, Toronto, Canada

A large painting of the Last Supper at Baylor University which was originally attributed to Murillo is now thought to have been painted by Velasco.
