= Maria de Abarca =

Spanish painter

Maria de Abarca, often referred to as Doña Maria de Abarca, was a seventeenth-century Spanish painter active between 1630 and 1656 in Madrid, Spain. She was born in Madrid, but the dates of her birth and death are unknown. Little is known of her family, but an entry in Dr. Coombe's Catalogue of Engravers' Specimens suggests that her father may have been Marius Abacus. She was known for her work as an amateur portrait painter, and praised for her ability in taking likenesses. Maria de Abarca was a contemporary of Peter Paul Rubens and Diego Velázquez, who reportedly admired her work.
