= Camillo Tinti =

Italian engraver

Camillo Tinti (born c. 1738) was an Italian engraver, born in Rome. He was employed by Gavin Hamilton to engrave some of the plates for his Schola Itálica; among these were the following: The Marriage of St. Catherine after Parmigianino; Meleager and Atalanta after Polidoro da Caravaggio; and Christ on the Mount of Olives after Giovanni Lanfranco.
