= Decio Trovati =

Italian ice hockey player

- Born: 16 October 1906; Genoa, Italy
- Died: 21 June 1968 (aged 61)
- Position: Right Wing
- Shot: Right
- National team: Italy
- Playing career: 1924–1941

Decio Guglielmo Romolo-Trovati (16 October 1906 – 21 June 1968) was an Italian ice hockey player. He competed in the men's tournament at the 1936 Winter Olympics.
