= David and Uriah =

1665–1669 painting by Rembrandt van Rijn

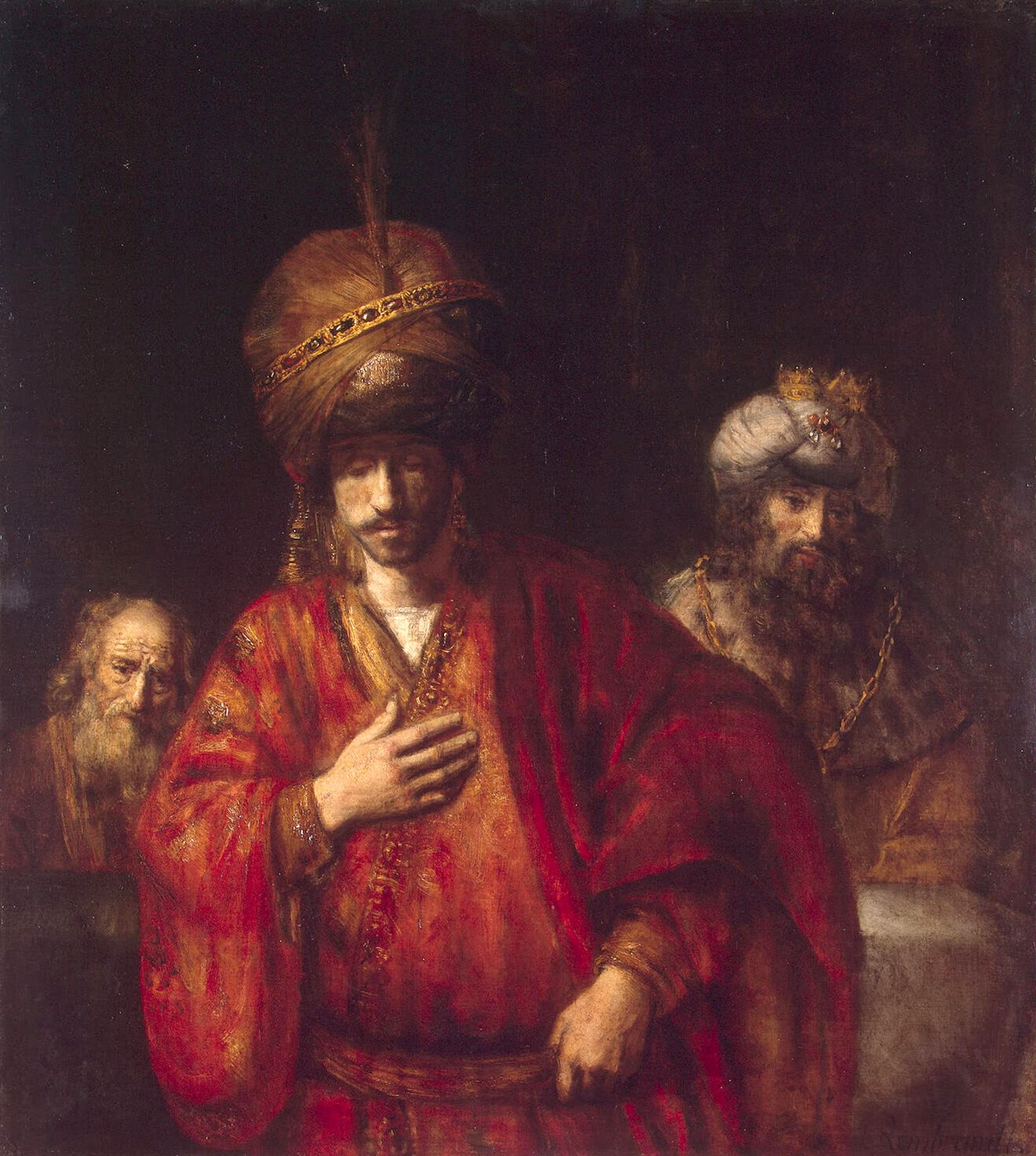
- Artist: Rembrandt van Rijn
- Year: circa 1665
- Medium: oil on canvas
- Dimensions: 127 cm × 116 cm (50 in × 46 in)
- Location: Hermitage, St-Petersburg

David and Uriah is a late, oil-on-canvas painting by Rembrandt, dated to around 1665 by the Hermitage Museum (which owns it) or c. 1666–1669 in the 2015 Late Rembrandt exhibition at the Rijksmuseum. It shows the moment when David sends Uriah the Hittite to the frontline of the war with the Ammonites so that David can sleep with Uriah's wife Bathsheba. Uriah is identified as the foreground figure, with David and Nathan in the background. It was first given this title by Abraham Bredius in his catalogue of Rembrandt's work – this has been supported by several other scholars from 1950 onwards, including in a 1965 study by Madlyn Kahr.

The work has also been identified as Haman Recognises His Fate after Haman from the Book of Esther. It entered the Russian imperial collection in 1773 with that title, which the Hermitage still retains.

== Gallery ==
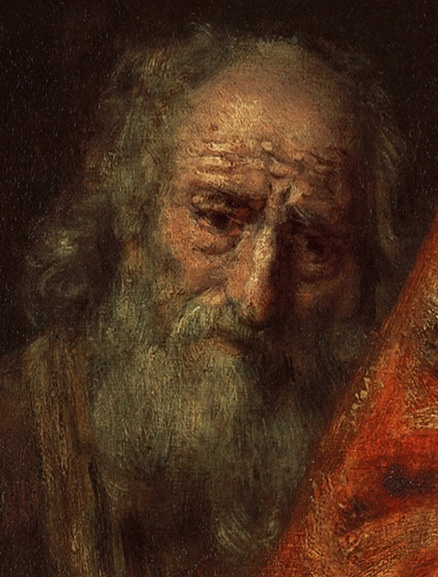
Nathan

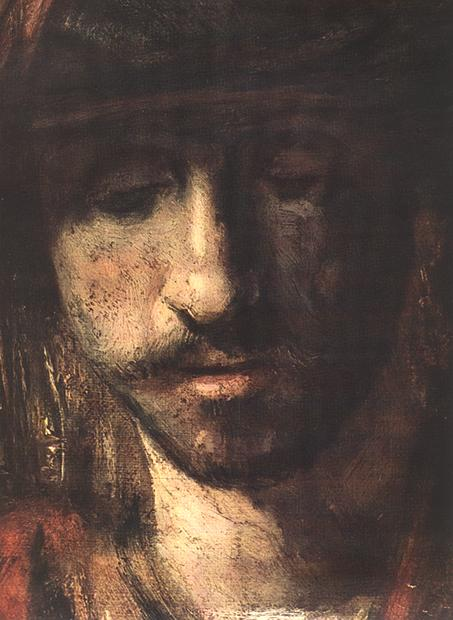
Uriah

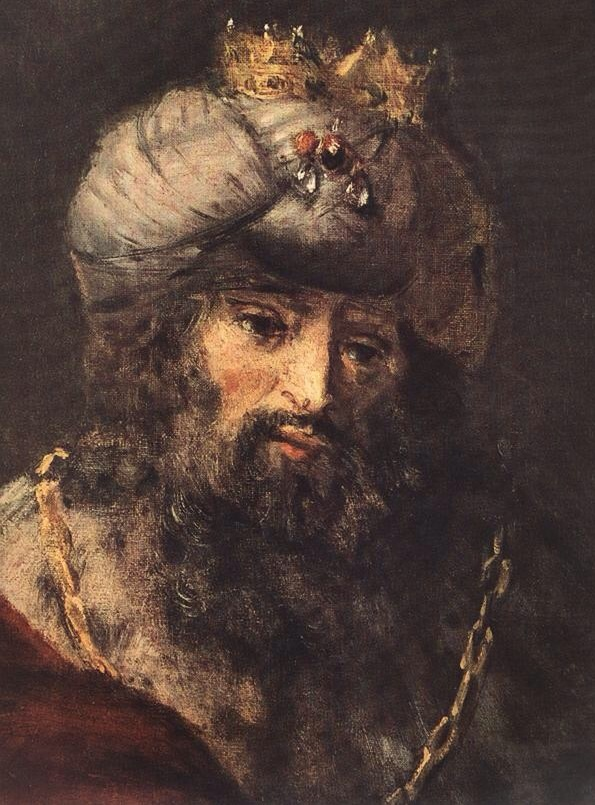
David

== See also ==
- List of paintings by Rembrandt
