= Maurelio Scanavini =

Italian painter

Maurelio Scanavini or Scannavini (Ferrara, 7 May 1665 – 1 June 1698) was an Italian painter of the Baroque period, mainly active in Ferrara.

== Biography ==
He trained as a fresco painter with Francesco Ferrari in Ferrara, then spent some time in Bologna, where he worked as an oil canvas painter under Carlo Cignani, at a time when Giacomo Parolini was also a pupil. He was a friend of the painter Baruffaldi. He is called the Leccardino and Laderchi recounts a small scandal when Scanavini painted a dog licking himself in a canvas, afterwards obscured, for the Oratory of San Crispino.

He is said to have died from melancholy from lack of payment for his work. Barotti quotes: "poverty and misfortune, who accompanied him wherever he went, were the reasons for his death".
