= Mater Dolorosa (Murillo) =

Painting by Bartolomé Esteban Murillo

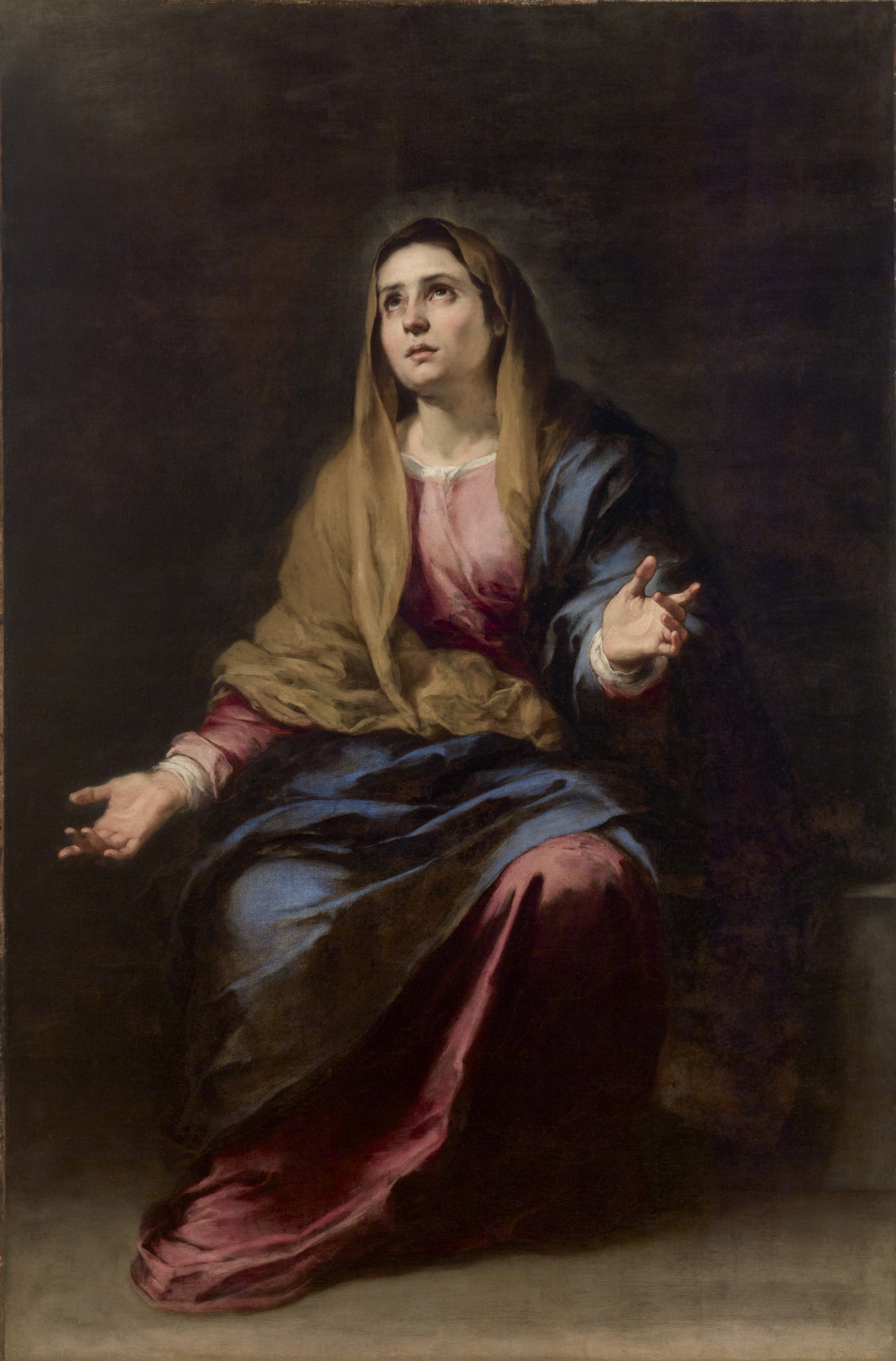
Mater Dolorosa (1665) by Bartolomé Esteban Murillo

The Mater Dolorosa is a painting of the Madonna by the Spanish artist Bartolomé Esteban Murillo. The work is in oils on canvas and was painted in 1665.

It is located in the Museo de Bellas Artes de Sevilla in Seville, Spain.

== See also ==
- Roman Catholic Marian art
