= Jaime Mosen Ponz =

Spanish painter

Jaime Mosen Ponz (Catalan: Jaume Pons y Monravà; 1671 – 30 March 1730) was a Spanish painter.

== Life ==
Ponz was born and died at Valls near Tarragona. He trained in the school of the Juncosas at Barcelona. In 1722 he painted a number of pictures for the Carthusians of Scala Dei. In 1723 he painted some frescoes on the dome of the Hermitage of Nuestra Señora de Misericordia. The parish church of Valls and Altafulla also had some frescoes by Ponz.
