= Giacomo Antonio Arland =

Italian painter

Giacomo Antonio Arland (c. 1668–1743) was an Italian painter of the Baroque period. He was born in Genoa, and at age 20, he traveled to Paris, where he was patronized by the Duke of Orleans. He became renowned as a portrait miniature painter. He returned in 1729 to Genoa as a wealthy man.
