= Dirk van der Burg =

Dutch painter

- Born: 10 August 1721; Utrecht, Dutch Republic
- Died: 2 June 1773 (aged 51); Utrecht, Dutch Republic
- Known for: Drawing, painting, watercolour

Dirk van der Burg (10 August 1721 – 2 July 1773) was a Dutch 18th-century artist, landscape painter and watercolourist.

He was born in Utrecht on 10 August 1721. He drew landscapes, some of which are currently in the Centraal Museum of Utrecht. He made especially sketches and drawings of towns, villages and castles, but also portraits. His works include landscapes of the Utrecht region: Leerdam (1743) and in 1749: Hagestein, Vianen, Tiel, Rijswijk and de Lek. In 1762 he visited Kennemerland and the Northern province of Brabant.

He died on 2 July 1773, and was buried in a family grave in the Buurkerk in Utrecht.

In 2008, the oil painting, Milking Time, was sold by Christies in Amsterdam

The influence of his work can be seen in the etchings of the artist J. van Hiltrop.
