= The Strode Family =

Painting by William Hogarth

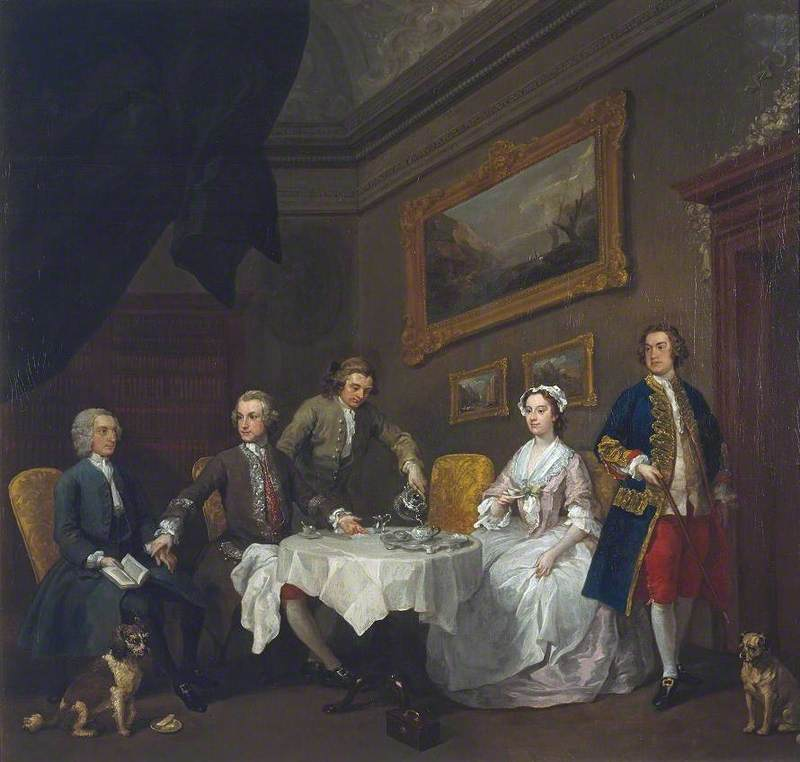
- Artist: William Hogarth
- Year: c. 1738
- Type: Oil on canvas, portrait painting
- Dimensions: 87 cm × 91.5 cm (34 in × 36.0 in)
- Location: Tate Britain; London

The Strode Family is a 1738 oil painting by the British artist William Hogarth. A conversation piece, it features a group portrait of the merchant William Strode and his family. Amongst those depicted are Strode's wife Lady Anne Cecil and his former tutor the Irish cleric Arthur Smyth who was later Archbishop of Dublin. Also present is a cousin Colonel Strode and a servant pouring tea. William Strode came from a family who has gained their wealth from the South Sea Company and has married Anne, the sister of the Earl of Salisbury in 1736. They walls of the room are covered in paintings of Italy, suggesting monentos from a Grand Tour. Today the work is in the collection of Tate Britain in Pimlico having been transferred from the National Gallery in 1951.

== Bibliography ==
- Einberg, Elizabeth and Egerton, Judy. The Age of Hogarth: British Painters Born 1675-1709. Tate Gallery, 1988.
- Hallet, Mark & Riding, Christine. Hogarth. Harry N. Abrams, 2006
- Smith, Chloe Wigston. Small Things in the Eighteenth Century: The Political and Personal Value of the Miniature. Cambridge University Press, 2022.
