= Antonio Richieri =

Italian painter

Antonio Richieri (born 1600) was an Italian painter of the Baroque period.

Born in Ferrara, he trained under Giovanni Lanfranco, and followed his master to Naples and Rome. He painted some frescoes at the Theatini from the designs of Lanfranco.
