= Filippo d'Angeli =

Italian painter

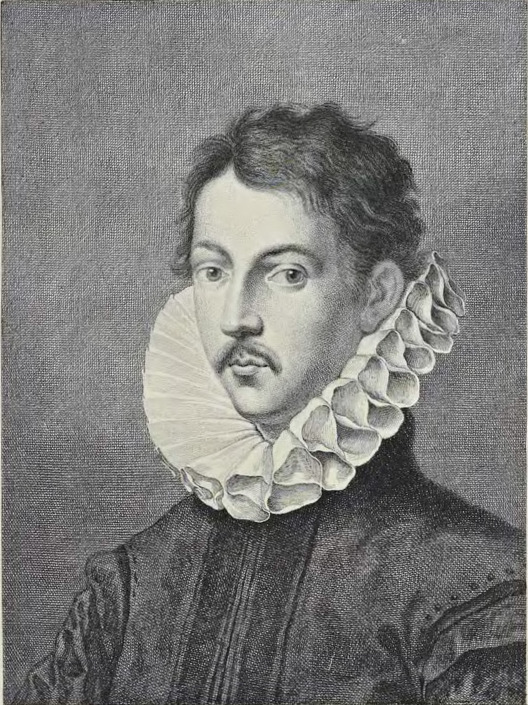
- Occupation: Painter

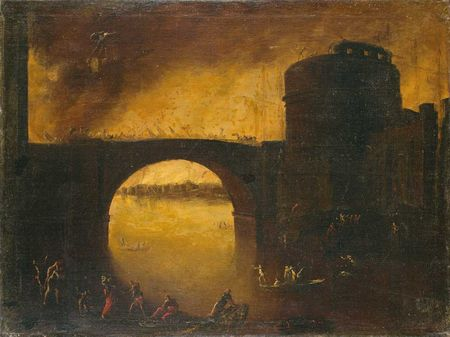
Filippo d'Angeli, Construction of a Bridge and Battles on a Bridge (2 fabrics)

Filippo d'Angeli (1600 – 1660) was an Italian painter of the Baroque period, active mainly in Florence and Naples, painting battle scenes with small figures. Despite being known as il Napoletano, he was born in Rome.
