= Jan van Almeloveen =

Dutch painter, engraver, and draughtsman

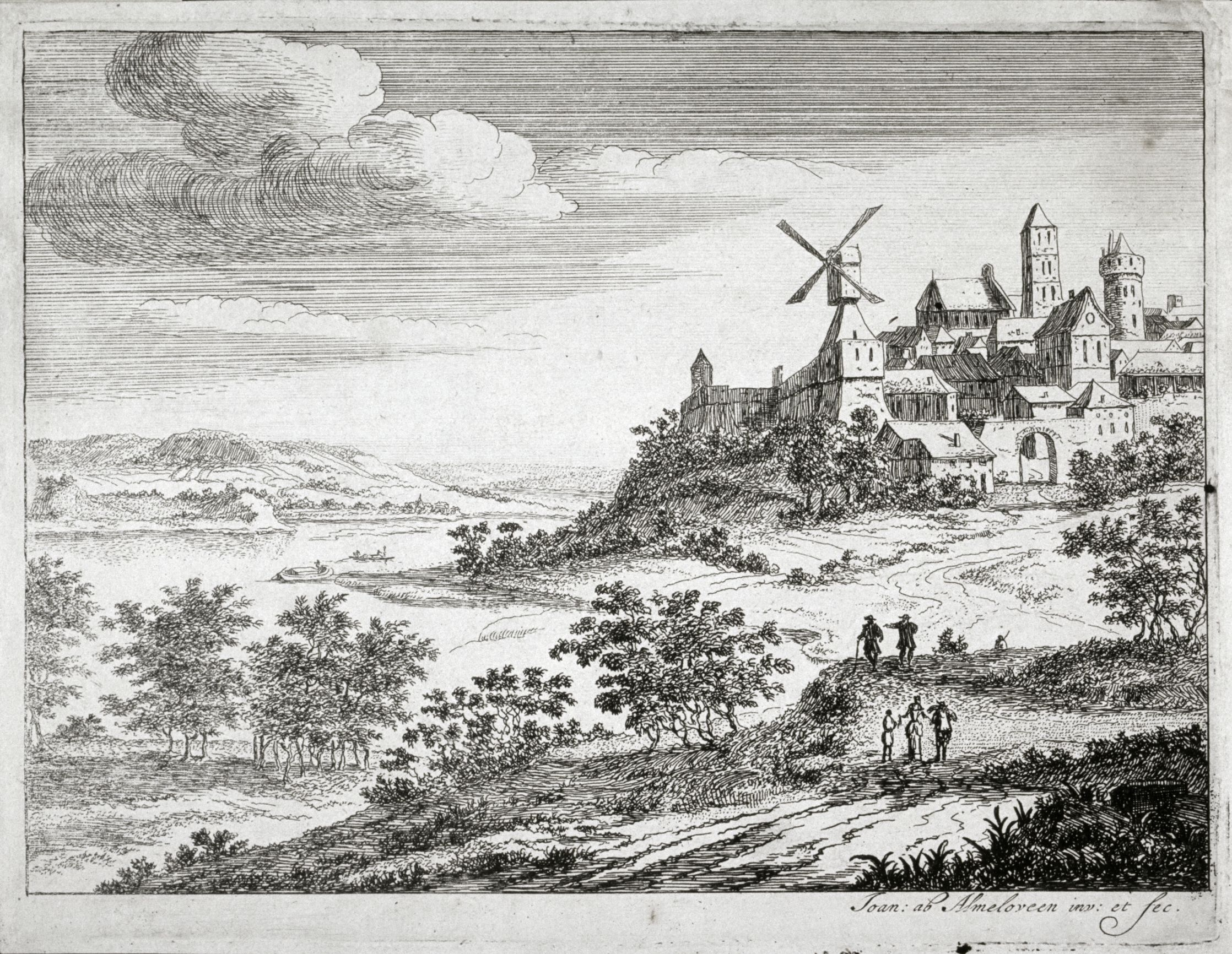
Landscape with River and Town on the high ground, from the Fine Arts Museums of San Francisco

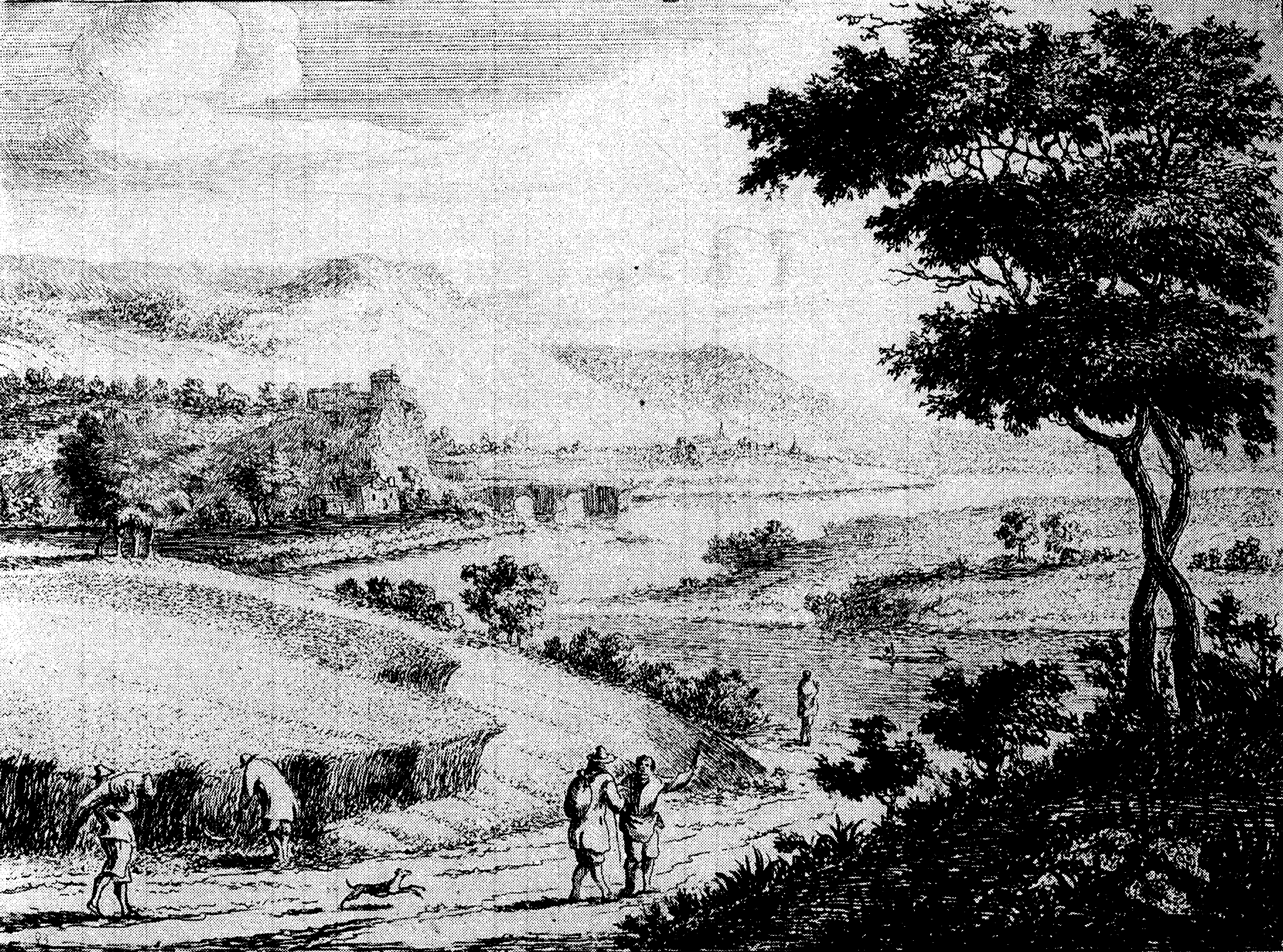
Landscape with Harvesters, from the Metropolitan Museum of Art

Jan van Almeloveen (1656 – 1684) was a Dutch painter, engraver, and draughtsman of the 17th century, principally known for some neatly executed etchings of landscapes.

He was born in Mijdrecht, according to an inscription on his 1678 mezzotint portrait of his father, Johannes ab Almeloveen, a preacher in that city. He made 38 prints in total, all of which are etchings, mostly landscapes, including Dutch villages and rivers. Twenty of his landscape prints are based on the work of Dutch painter Herman Saftleven, with twelve depicting Dutch villages, and a series of four diamond-shaped prints of the Four Seasons. The other prints were created from his own designs and are less lively in composition. He died sometime after 1683, the year written on his last known print.

His Landscape with Harvesters illustrates the mid-17th-century shift in Dutch landscape art from a fascination with agricultural work that was prevalent in the 16th century, to a recreational interest in the scenery and the pleasures of country life.
