= Michele Rocca =

Italian painter (1671–1751)

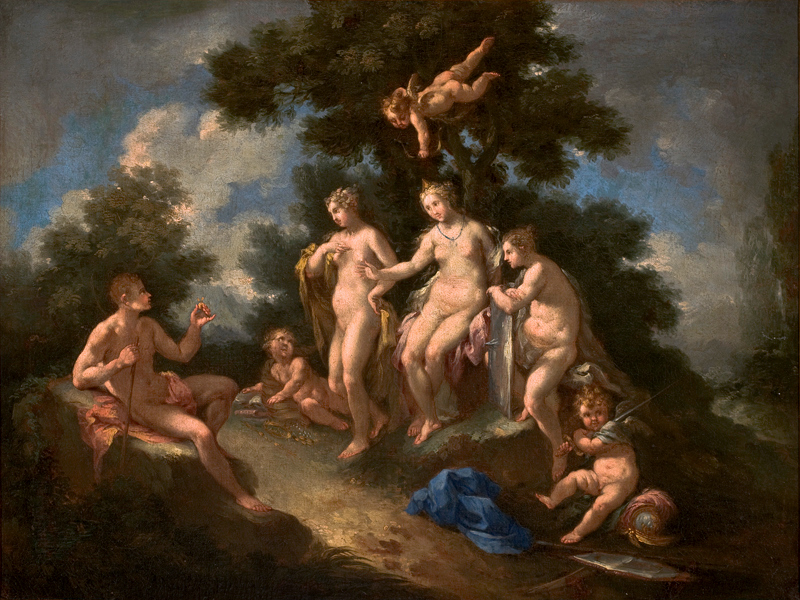
Michele Rocca, The Judgement of Paris, c.1710, São Paulo Museum of Art

Michele Rocca (1671-died after 1751) was an Italian painter of the Baroque period. He was born in Parma and practised in Rome, and died some time after 1751. He was also called Parmigianino the younger or Michele da Parma. He worked in the manner of Pietro da Cortona.
