= Francesco Albotto =

Italian painter (1721–1757)

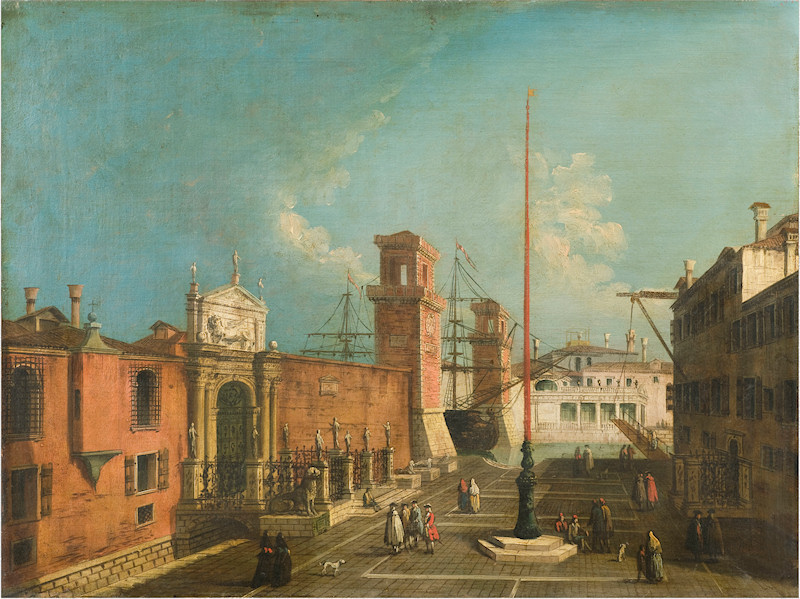
Veduta del campo e delle porte dell'Arsenale, 1743–1746 (Fondazione Cariplo)

Francesco Albotto (1721–1757) was an Italian painter from Venice, mainly producing vedute. He was a pupil of Michele Marieschi. After Marieschi's death, Albotto married his widow and took over his shop, and continued to produce paintings in a similar style until his own death, which has led to some problems in attributing paintings to Marieschi versus Albotto.

== Works ==
- Veduta del Molo e del Bacino di San Marco, Sotheby's, New York,
- San Giuseppe di Castello (1745), oil canvas, private collection
- Campo Santi Giovanni
- Molo San Marco
- Capriccio con obelisco, oil canvas, Galleria Lorenzelli, Bergame,
- Capriccio con obelisco e arco gotico, oil canvas, Gallerie dell'Accademia, Venise,
- Campo dei Santi Giovanni e Paolo, oil canvas, Gallerie dell'Accademia, Venise,
- View of grand canal with the Santa Maria della Salute church, oil canvas,
- View of the camp and doors of the Arsenal (1743–1746),
- View of the Piazzetta, with the Palazzo Ducale and the Biblioteca Marciana, Westbury Fine Art ltd, oil on canvas

== Bibliography ==
- R. Toledano, Michele Marieschi: l'opera completa, Milan, 1988,
- Dario Succi, Marieschi: tra Canaletto e Guardi, catalogue, Turin, 1989,
- M. Manzelli, Michele Marieschi e il suo alter-ego Francesco Albotto, Venise, 1991,
- Domenico Sedini, Francesco Albotto, online catalogue Artgate of the Fondazione Cariplo, 2010, CC-BY-SA.
- Miklós Boskovits, Giorgio FossaluzzaLa collezione Cagnola. I dipinti, editor: Nomos Edizioni, Busto Arsizio, 1998.

== Other projects ==
Media related to Francesco Albotto at Wikimedia Commons
