= Antonio Bacci (painter) =

Italian painter

Antonio Bacci (17th century) was an Italian painter of the Baroque period, active in Rovigo as a still life painter. He was born c. 1600 and still alive in Venice in 1665.

== Bibliography ==
- Ticozzi, Stefano (1830). Dizionario degli architetti, scultori, pittori, intagliatori in rame ed in pietra, coniatori di medaglie, musaicisti, niellatori, intarsiatori d'ogni etá e d'ogni nazione' (Volume 1). Milan: Gaetano Schiepatti. p. 93.
- Bryan, Michael (1886). Robert Edmund Graves (ed.). Dictionary of Painters and Engravers, Biographical and Critical. Vol. I: A-K. London: George Bell and Sons. pp. 65–66.
