= Carlo Antonio Tavella =

Italian painter (1668–1738)

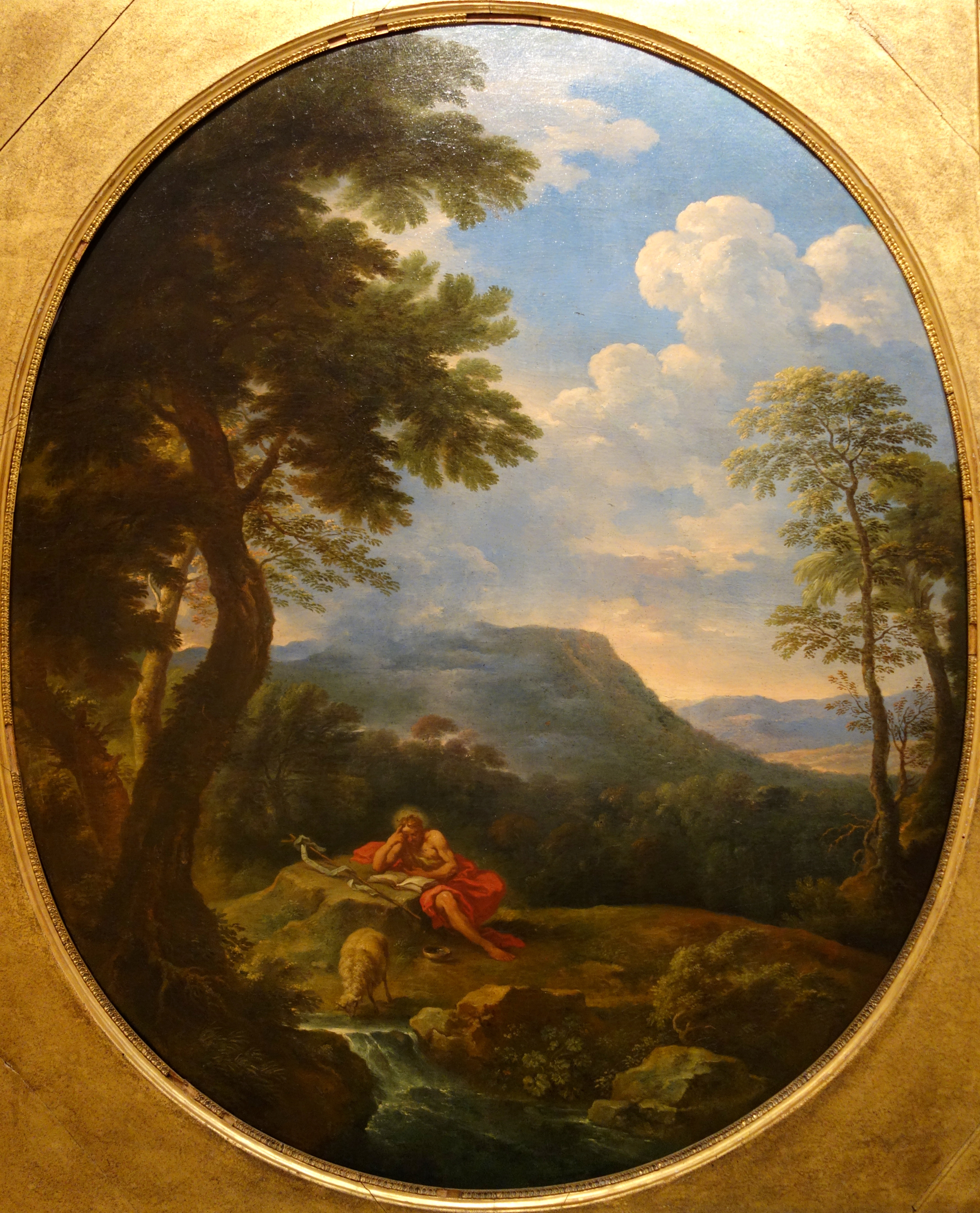
Landscape with Saint John the Baptist

Carlo Antonio Tavella (1668–1738) was an Italian painter of the Baroque period, active mainly in Genoa.

== Biography ==
Tavella was born in Milan, the son of Domenico Tavella, a Genoese merchant, Domenico. He was initially the pupil of the painter Giuseppe Merati, then later of a painter by the name of Johann Gruembroech or Greuenbrech, also called il Solfarolo. Later in 1695, Tavella worked with the Dutch painter Pieter Mulier II (Molyn), also known as Cavaliere Tempesta or il Tempesta.

In the following years, Tavella worked as a landscape painter for Alessandro Magnasco and Domenico and Paolo Piola. He helped decorate Palazzo Franchi in Genoa. Tavella had daughters by of the name of Teresa and Angiola (who was herself a painter). Among his other pupils was Niccolò Micone, known locally as Lo Zoppo. He died in Genoa in 1738.

== Sources ==
- Bryan, Michael (1889). Walter Armstrong; Robert Edmund Graves (eds.). Dictionary of Painters and Engravers, Biographical and Critical. Vol. II L-Z. London: George Bell and Sons. p. 554.
- Soprani, Raffaello (1769). Carlo Giuseppe Ratti (ed.). Delle vite de' pittori, scultori, ed architetti genovesi; Tomo secundo scritto da Carlo Giuseppe Ratti. Genoa: Stamperia Casamara. pp. 198–207.
