= Francescantonio Coratoli =

Italian painter (1671–1722)

Francesco Antonio Coratoli (13 December 1671 – 10 June 1722) was an Italian painter of the late-Baroque or Rococo periods.

Born in Monteleone di Puglia, Coratoli trained under a painter by the name of Zoda. He travelled to Rome to study painting. His works include frescoes in the Basilica di San Leone Luca, Santa Maria di Gesù, a Coronation of the Virgin for the church of Santa Maria degli Angeli, and a Marriage of St. Joseph for il Gesù. He died in Monteleone in 1722 at age 50.
