= Georg Pachmann =

Austrian painter (c. 1600 – 1652)

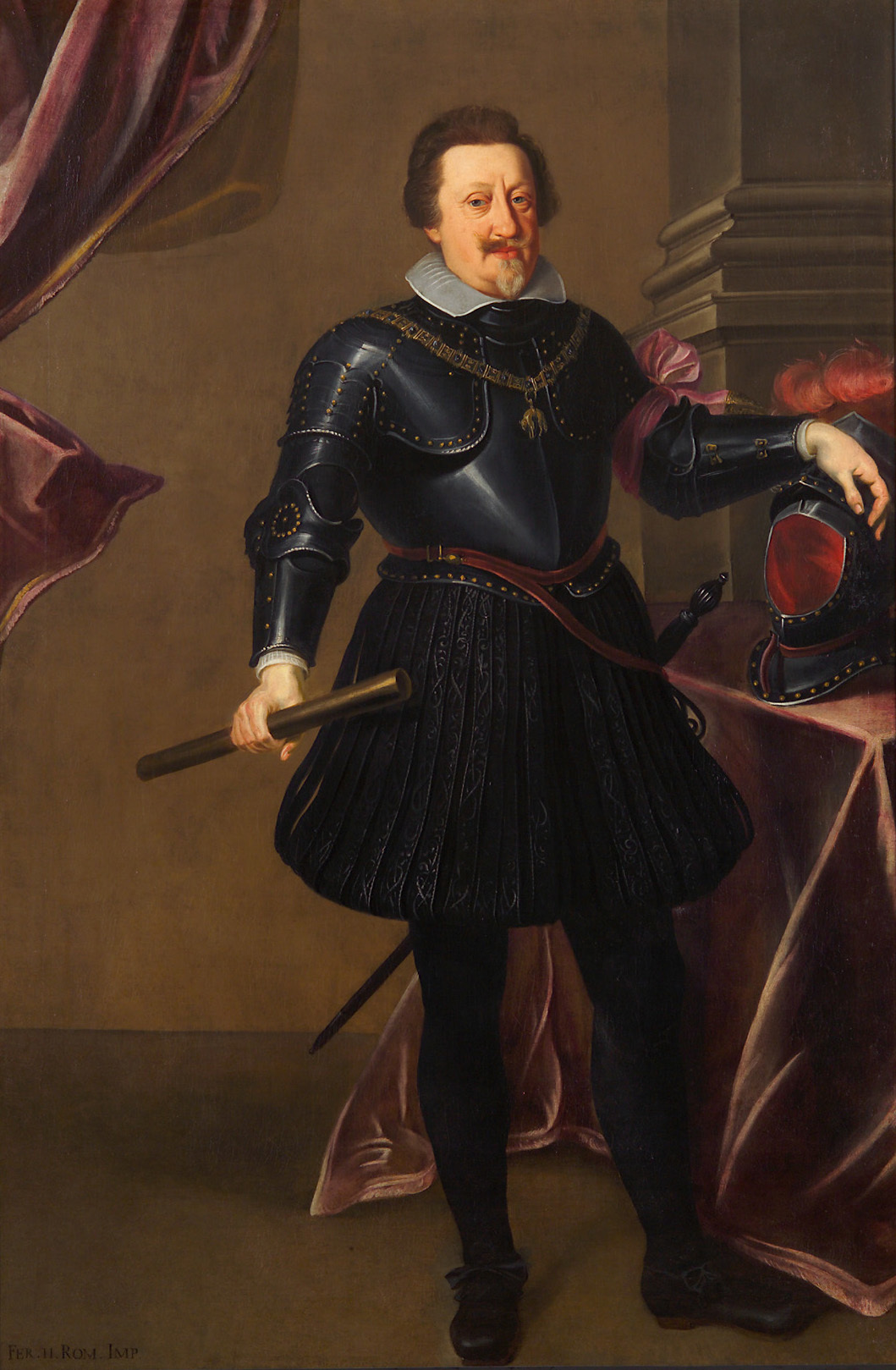
Portrait of Ferdinand II, Holy Roman Emperor, Kunsthistorisches Museum, 1635

Georg Pachmann (c. 1600 – 1652) was an Austrian painter.

Pachmann was born in Frymburk, Bohemia. He specialised in painting portraits, including many royal subjects. Pachmann died in Vienna in 1652.
