= Francesco Antonio Caneti =

Italian painter

Francesco Antonio Caneti (1652–1721) was an Italian miniature painter of the Baroque period. He was born at Cremona, where he was a pupil of Giovanni Battista Natali. He afterwards became a Capuchin friar.
