= Paolo Alboni =

Italian painter

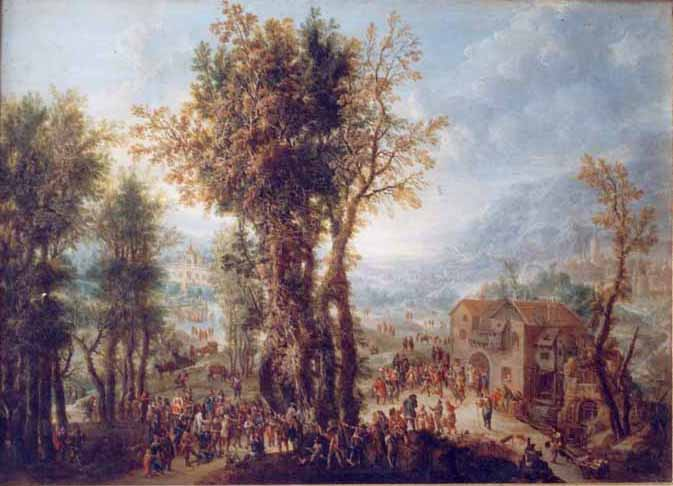
Folk Party near a Mill (1713), oil on copper, in the collection of the Brukenthal National Museum

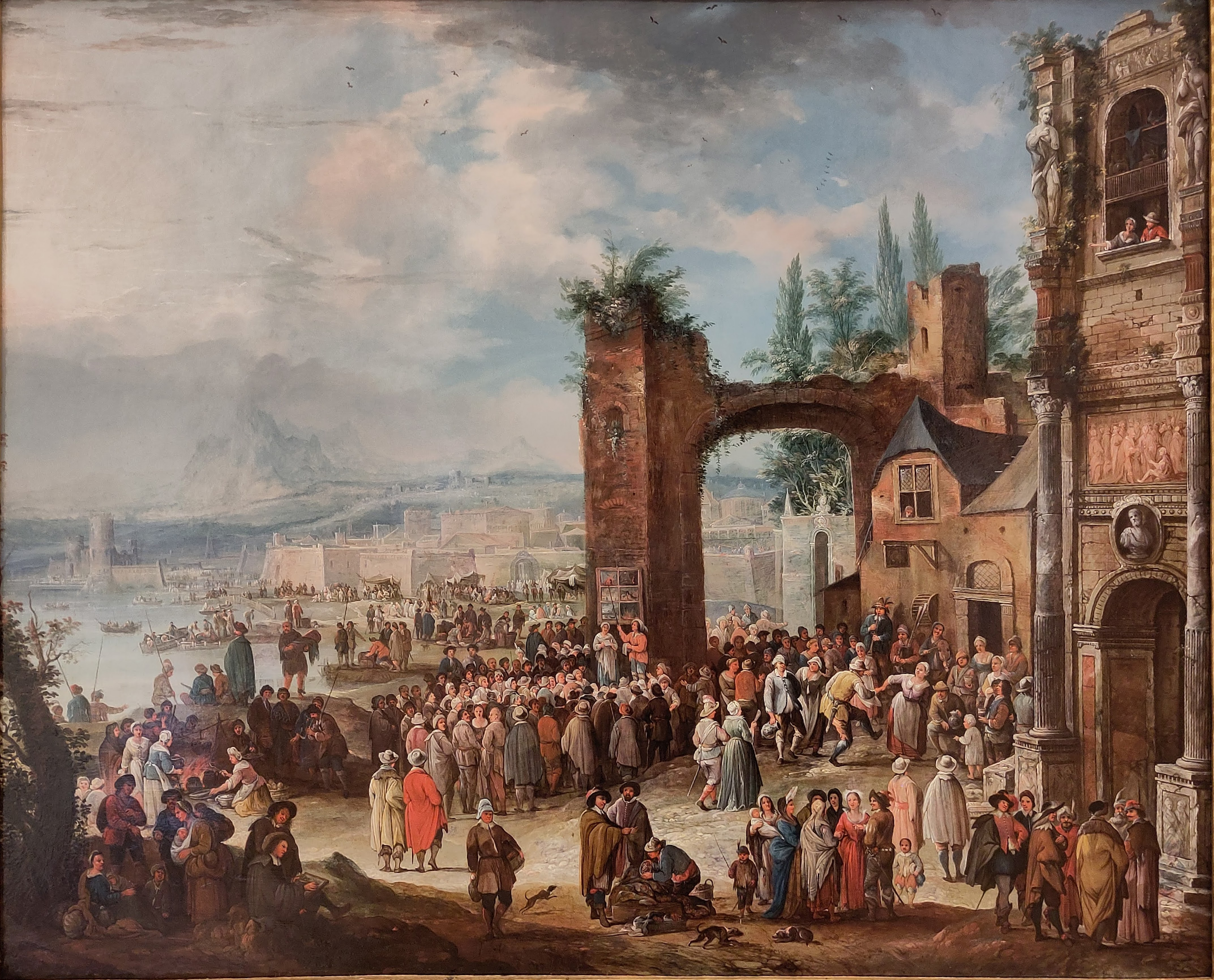
City with Harbour, oil on copper, in the collection of the Brukenthal National Museum

Paolo Antonio Alboni (1671 – 5 October 1734) was an Italian painter of the late-Baroque period. He was born and trained in Bologna, where he became a landscape painter.

== Biography ==
Paolo Alboni was born in Bologna to an ancient and very comfortable family of Antonio and Angiola Alboni. He formed his painting preferences by studying the Nordic landscape artists, from whom he derived the particular dedication to landscapes.

He lived and worked in Rome and then in Naples, a city in which he enjoyed considerable success, and then returned home, where he married and had three children, of whom one, Rosa, was his follower. In 1710 he went to Vienna, where he remained until 1722, but being deprived of the use of his right side by a stroke, he returned to Bologna, and subsequently painted with his left hand.

He died in 1730 and was buried in the church of San Procolo. In addition to his daughter, he had a single pupil, Gabriello Giuseppe Patarazzi, who became an Augustinian.

His daughter, Luigia Maria Rosa Alboni, was also a landscape painter. She died in 1759.
