= Giulio Cesare Fellini =

Italian painter of the Baroque period

Giulio Cesare Fellini (born c. 1600) was an Italian painter of the Baroque period. He was a pupil of Gabriele Ferrantini and Annibale Carracci. He excelled in painting horses and figures, and was assisted by his son Marcantonio Fellini.
