= Decio Termisani =

Italian painter

Decio Termisani (1565—1600) was an Italian painter of the late-Renaissance. He was born in Naples, and studied there first under Giovanni Filippo Criscuolo, and then under Pittone and Marco Pino. He painted a Last supper (1597) for the church of Santa Maria a Piazza.
