= 1737 in art =

Events from the year 1737 in art.

== Events ==
- The Salon of 1737 opens at the Louvre in Paris. It was the beginning of the Salon as a regular, scheduled event

== Paintings ==
- Pompeo Batoni – The Triumph of Venice
- Canaletto – St. Mark's and the Campanile, Venice (National Gallery of Canada, Ottawa)
- William Hogarth – The Good Samaritan
- Balthazar Nebot – Covent Garden Market
- Charles Parrocel – Halt of the King's Mounted Grenadiers
- Charles-André van Loo – The Grand Turk Giving a Concert to his Mistress
- Jean Baptiste van Loo – Portrait of William Murray
- Richard Wilson – The Inner Temple after the Fire of 4th January 1736/7

== Births ==
- February 24 – Étienne Dantoine, French sculptor (died 1809)
- May 22 – Tethart Philipp Christian Haag, German-born Dutch portrait artist (died 1812)
- June 9 – Hendrik-Jozef Antonissen, Dutch landscape painter (died 1794)
- August 10 – Anton Losenko, Ukrainian-Russian Neoclassical painter who specialized in historical subjects and portraits (died 1773)
- August 11 – Joseph Nollekens, English sculptor, founder member of the Royal Academy (died 1823)
- September 15 – Jacob Philipp Hackert, landscape painter (died 1807)
- September 30 – Magdalene Bärens, Danish still life painter (died 1808)
- October 14 – José del Castillo, Spanish painter and a leader of the artistic movement "Illustrious Absolutism" (died 1793)
- October 30 – Niclas Lafrensen, Swedish genre and miniature painter (died 1807)
- November 7 – Johann Eleazar Zeissig, German genre and portrait painter, porcelain painter and engraver (died 1806)
- date unknown
  - Philippe Curtius, wax modeller (died 1794)
  - John Donaldson, Scottish miniature painter in enamel and water-colours (died 1801)
  - Antonio Diziani, Italian painter of veduta, landscapes, and vistas (died 1797)
  - Christopher Hewetson, Irish sculptor (died 1798)
  - Carlo Giuseppe Ratti, Italian art biographer and painter (died 1795)

== Deaths ==
- January 22 – Jean-Baptiste van Mour, Flemish-French painter (born 1671)
- March 17 – Hugh Howard, Irish portrait-painter and collector of works of art (born 1675)
- April 12 – Giovanni Battista Foggini, Italian sculptor of small bronze statuary (born 1652)
- June 4 – François Lemoyne, French rococo painter (born 1686)
- October 13 - Bernhard Vogel, German engraver (born 1683)
- December 3 – Giovanni Battista Tagliasacchi, Italian painter of historical scenes and portraits (born 1697)
- date unknown
  - Francisco Bustamante, painter (born 1680)
  - Evaristo Muñoz, Spanish painter (born 1684)
  - Francesco Penso, Venetian sculptor (born 1665)
