= Girl with a Racquet =

1737 painting by Jean Siméon Chardin

Girl with Racket and Shuttlecock
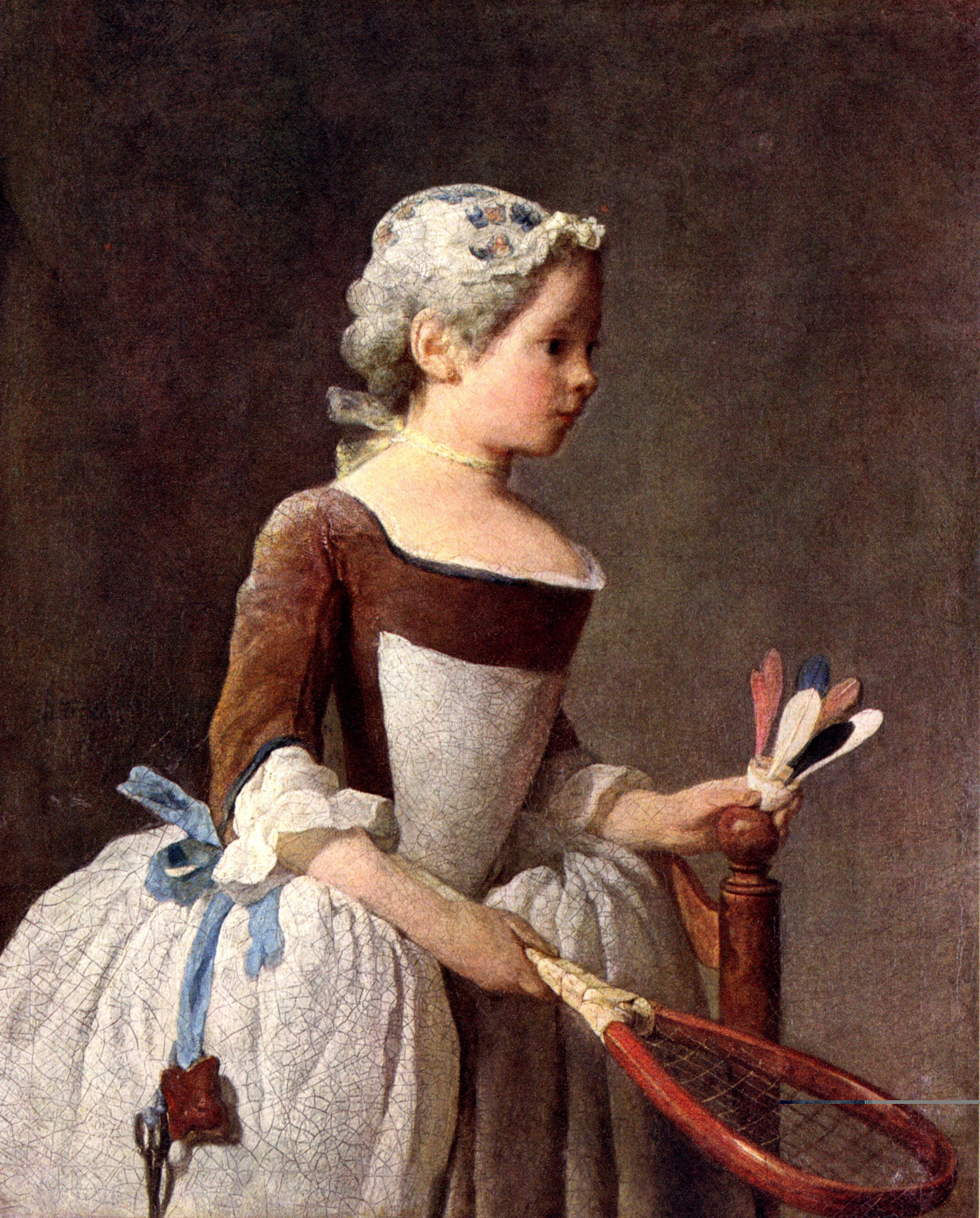
- Year: 1737
- Dimensions: 82 cm (32 in) × 66 cm (26 in)

Girl with a Racquet or Girl Playing with a Racquet is an oil-on-canvas painting of a young girl holding a racquet and shuttlecock by the French artist Jean Siméon Chardin. He exhibited it at the Paris Salon of 1737 as a pendant to The House of Cards (Washington) – he also exhibited Woman Playing in a Fountain and The Laundress (Stockholm) in the same Salon. It is now in the Uffizi in Florence, whose collections it entered in 1951.
