= Iris Theatre (company) =

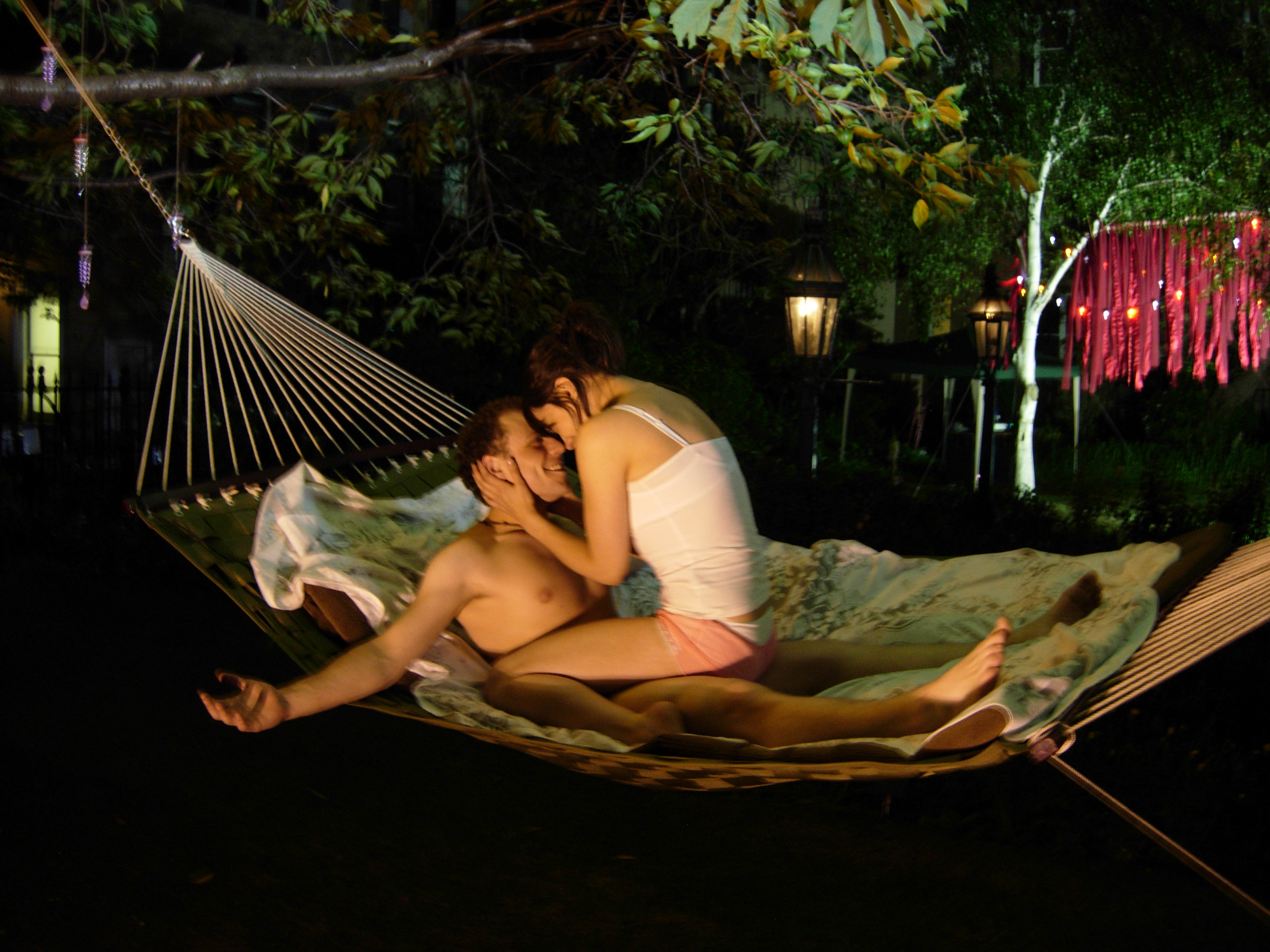
2009 Production of 'Romeo & Juliet' starring Laura Wickham and Sam Donnelly

Iris Theatre is a professional theatre company created in 2007 by Dr. Daniel Winder to produce work at St. Paul's Church, Covent Garden.

It is particularly known for its outdoor productions which run throughout the summer months, playing to audiences of 10,000 people a summer. These summer productions generally pair a Shakespeare play alongside a classic family show.

Iris Theatre became a charity in 2009.

Artistic director 2007–2019: Dr. Daniel Winder.
