= John Hester (priest) =

John Frear Hester, QHC (21 January 1927 – 9 February 2008) was a British Anglican priest and chaplain. An Anglo-Catholic with liberal views, he held a special ministry to the entertainment world as secretary of the Actors' Church Union and served varied chaplaincies, ranging from strip clubs to Brighton and Hove Albion Football Club. In addition to his chaplaincy, he served in parish ministry, including as rector of Soho (1963–1975), priest-in-charge of St Paul's, Covent Garden ("the actors' church"; 1969–1975), vicar of Brighton (1975–1985) and finally canon residentiary and precentor of Chichester Cathedral from 1985 until he retired in 1997.

== Personal life ==
In 1959, he married Elizabeth, daughter of Sir Eric Riches. Together they had three sons.

Hester was friends with "a wide circle of people in entertainment", including Peter Sellers. He was godfather to Sellers's daughter, Victoria, and officiated at his funeral.

== Selected works ==
- Hester, John (1970). Soho is my parish. London: Lutterworth Pres. ISBN 9780718817046.
