= St Paul's, Covent Garden =

St. Paul's, Covent Garden
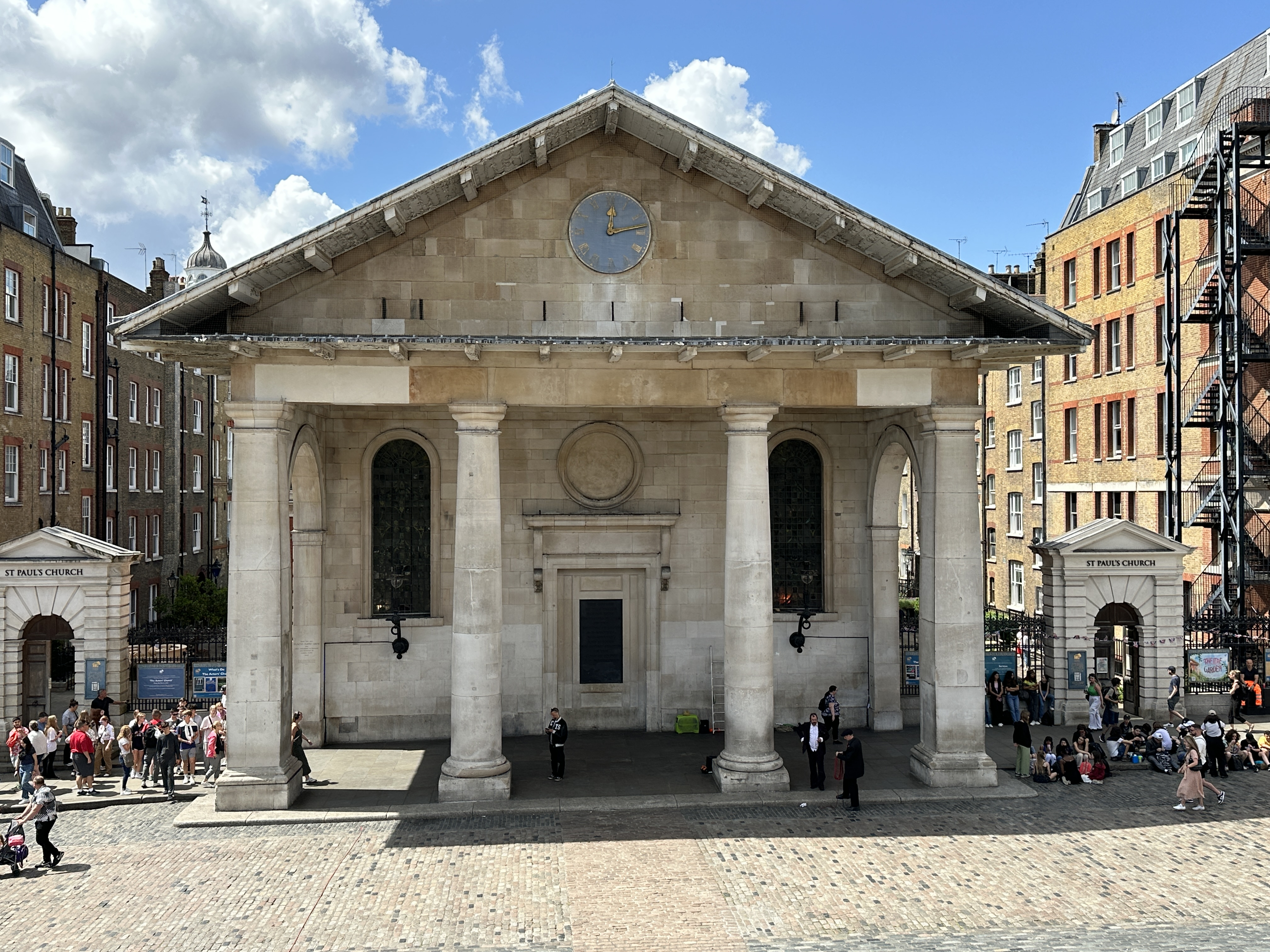
- St Paul's at Covent Garden in June 2023
- St. Paul's, Covent Garden
- 51°30′41″N 0°7′27″W
- OS grid reference: TQ 30300 80849
- Location: Bedford Street, Covent Garden, London
- Country: England
- Denomination: Church of England
- Churchmanship: High Church
- Website: http://www.actorschurch.org/

Architecture
- Heritage designation: Grade I
- Architect: Inigo Jones
- Years built: 1631–1633

Administration
- Diocese: London

St Paul's Church is a Church of England parish church located in Bedford Street, Covent Garden, central London. It was designed by Inigo Jones as part of a commission for the 4th Earl of Bedford in 1631 to create "houses and buildings fit for the habitations of Gentlemen and men of ability". Initially serving as an auxiliary chapel for the St. Martin-in-the-Fields parish, it was raised to a parish church with a dedication to Saint Paul in 1646, as the Covent Garden district expanded. The church is nicknamed "the actors' church" by a long association with the theatre community, particularly in the West End.

Completed in 1633, St Paul's was the first entirely new church to be built in London since the Reformation. Its design and the layout of the square have been attributed to Inigo Jones since the 17th century, although firm documentary evidence is lacking. According to an often repeated story, recorded by Horace Walpole, Lord Bedford asked Jones to design a simple church "not much better than a barn", to which the architect replied "Then you shall have the handsomest barn in England".

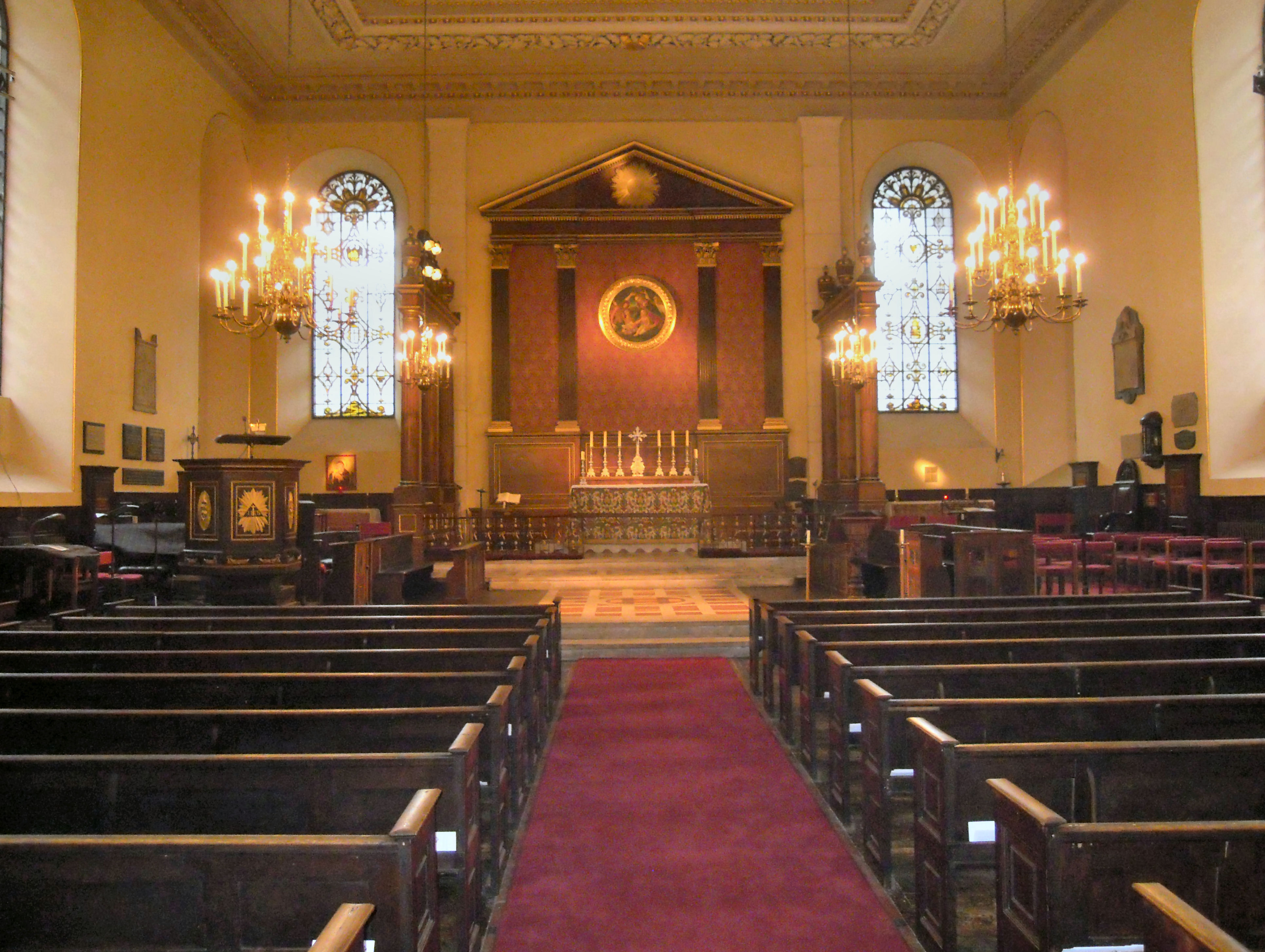
Nave and sanctuary

Jones's design closely follows the description of an Etruscan-style temple by Ancient Roman architect Vitruvius, which reflects the early forms of Roman temple. These essentially continued Etruscan architecture, though quite what Vitruvius intended by his account has divided modern scholars. The building is described by Sir John Summerson as "a study in the strictly Vitruvian Tuscan Order" and "almost an archaeological exercise". It has been seen as a work of deliberate primitivism: the Tuscan order having been associated by Renaissance architect Palladio with agricultural buildings.

The temple front with a portico on the square has never in fact been the main entrance, although this may have been Jones's first intention. The altar lies behind this wall, and the entrance is at the far end to this. The stone facing of this facade is also later; originally it was apparently brick with stucco. The other sides of the building remain brick, with details in stone. The triangular pediments at both ends are in wood.

== History ==
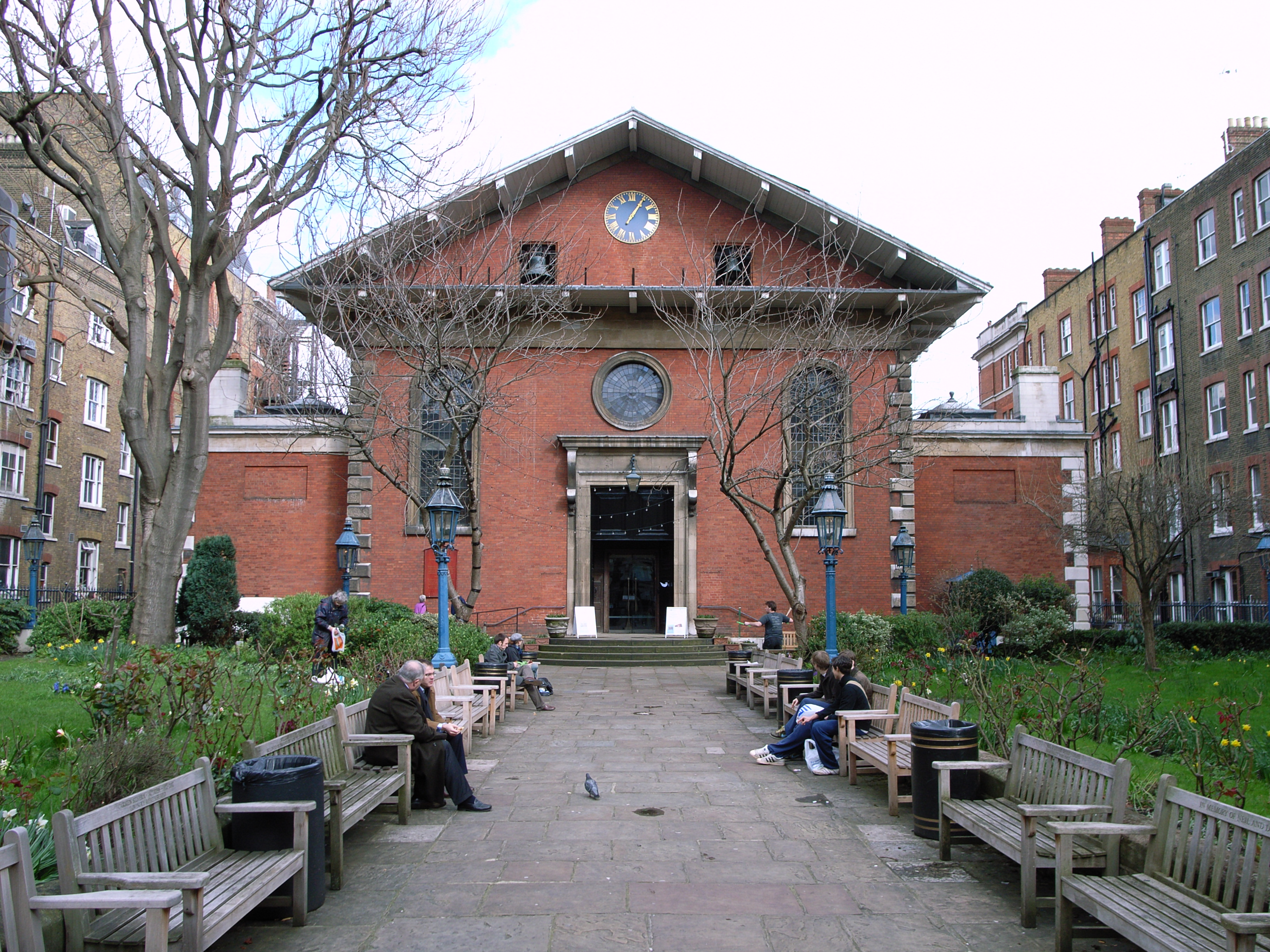
West end with entrance

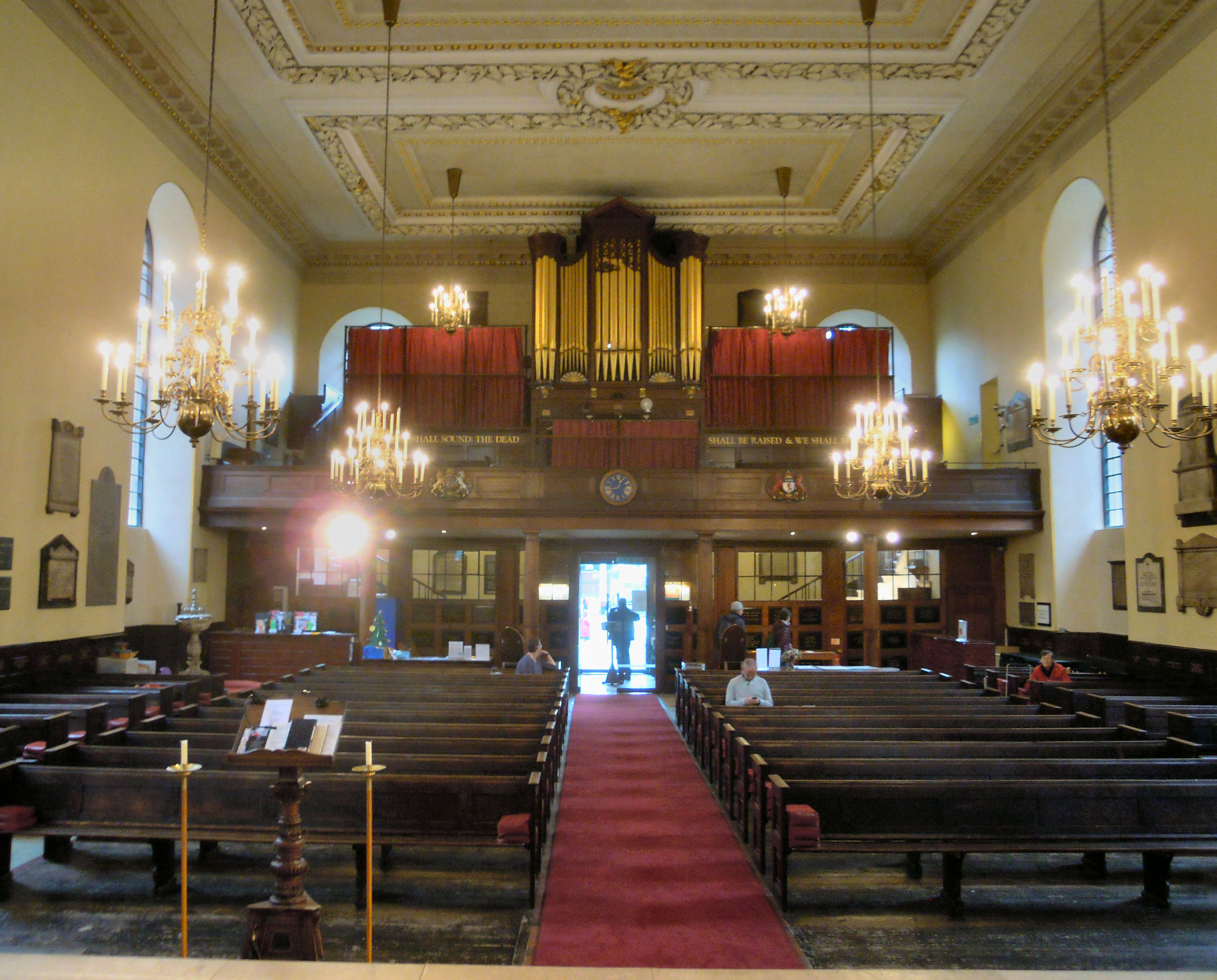
The nave from the altar

Precinct of Covent Garden Act 1660
- Act of Parliament
- Parliament of England
- Long title: An Act for making the Precinct of Covent Garden Parochial.
- Citation: 12 Cha. 2. c. 35 Pr.
- Territorial extent: England and Wales

Dates
- Royal assent: 29 December 1660
- Commencement: 25 April 1660 (Note: Start of session.)

Status: Current legislation

In 1630, the 4th Earl of Bedford was given permission to demolish buildings on an area of land he owned north of the Strand, and redevelop it. The result was the Covent Garden Piazza, the first formal square in London. The new buildings were classical in character. At the west end was a church, linked to two identical houses. The south side was left open.

Work on the church was completed in 1633, at a cost to the Bedford estate of £4,886, but it was not consecrated until 1638 due to a dispute between the earl and the vicar of St Martin-in-the-Fields. It remained a chapel within the parish of St Martin-in-the-Fields until January 1646, when Covent Garden was made a separate parish and the church dedicated to St. Paul.

In 1789 there was a major restoration of the church, under the direction of the architect Thomas Hardwick. Six years later, in September 1795, the church was burnt out by a fire, accidentally started by workmen on the roof. A survey of the damage found that the outer walls were still structurally sound, but that the portico would have to be reconstructed. It is unclear whether this was in fact done. Having been restored once more, again under Hardwick's supervision, the church was reconsecrated on 1 August 1798. Despite the destruction, the parish records were saved, as was the pulpit — the work of Grinling Gibbons.

The puritan Thomas Manton ministered from the pulpit of St Paul's until the Great Ejection. On 23 September 1662 Simon Patrick, later Bishop of Ely, was preferred to the rectory of St. Paul's where he served during the plague.

The first known victim of the 1665–1666 outbreak of the Plague in England, Margaret Ponteous, was buried in the churchyard on 12 April 1665.

== Architecture ==
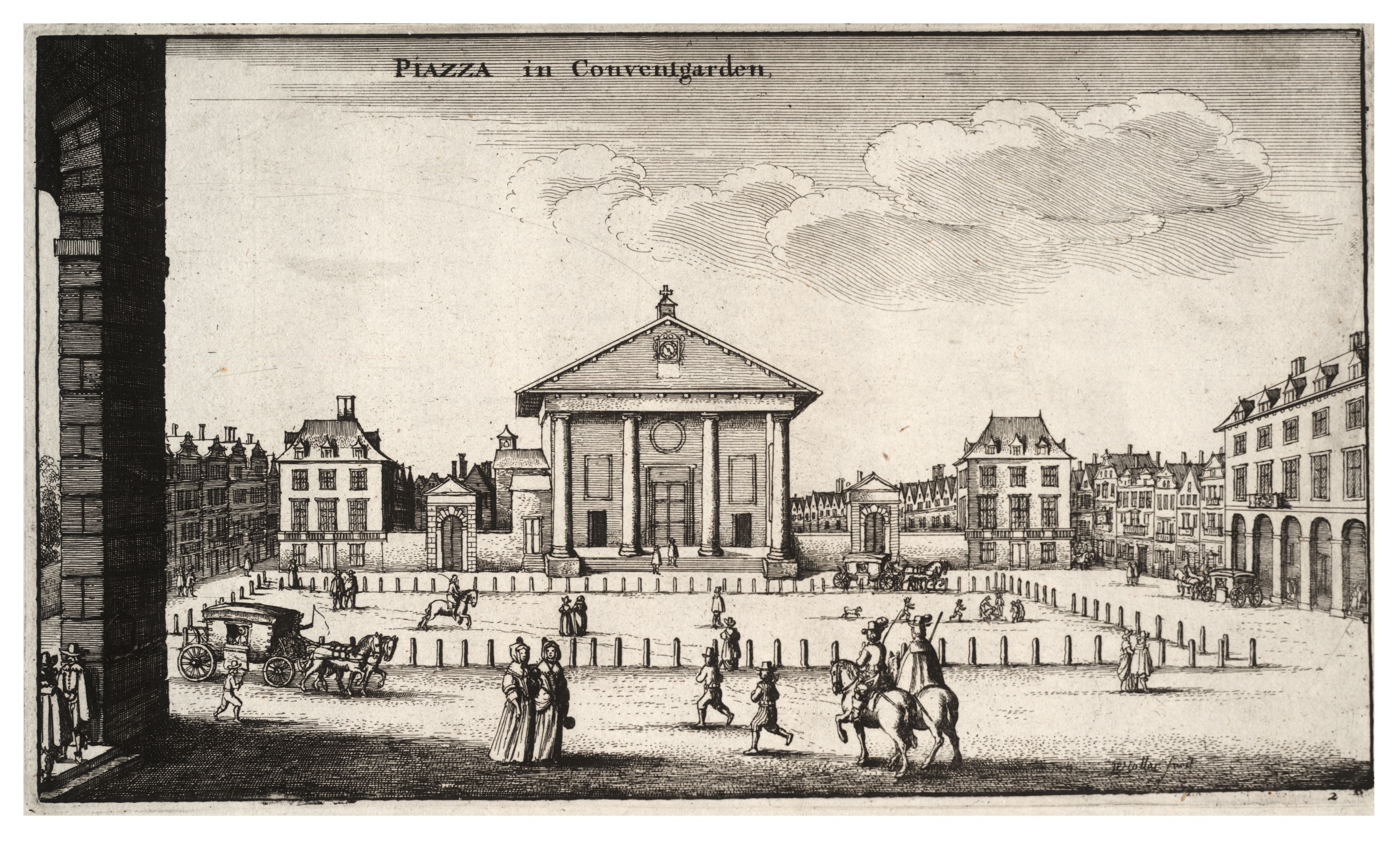
Wenceslas Hollar, before 1677

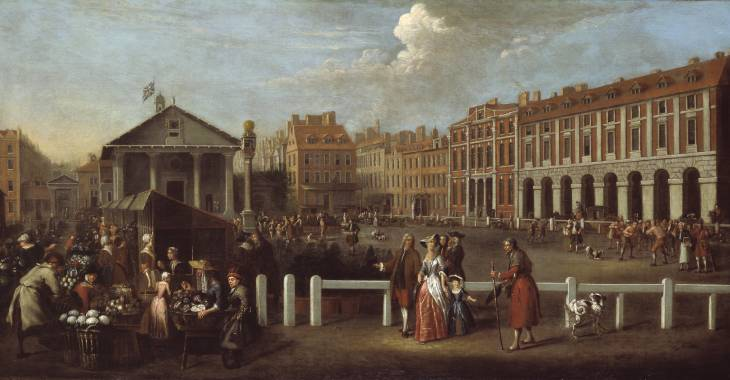
Covent Garden Piazza painted in 1737 by Balthazar Nebot

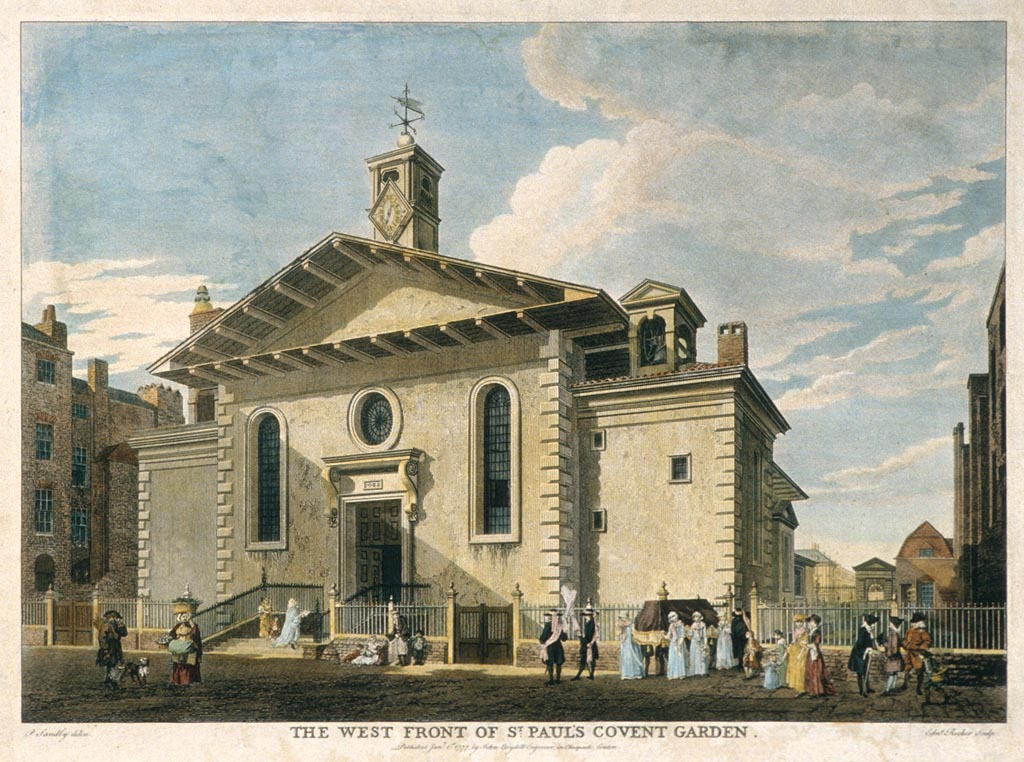
A view from Edward Rooker's "Six Views of London", 1766

The east end, facing the piazza, is now faced in stone, with a massive portico, its boldly-projecting pediment supported by two columns and two piers. There were originally three doorways behind the portico; the middle one, which survives, was built as a false door as the interior wall behind it is occupied by the altar. The other two were blocked up in the 19th century, when the chancel floor was raised. The main entrance to the church is through the plainer west front, which has a pediment, but no portico. William Prynne, writing in 1638 said that it was originally intended to have the altar at the west end, but pressure from the church hierarchy led to the imposition of the traditional orientation. The pathway to this Western entrance is named Inigo Place, after the architect, having been formerly called Church Place. The gateway from Inigo Place onto Bedford Street has been a Grade II listed building since 1973.

The earliest existing detailed description, dating from 1708, says that the exterior was not of bare brick, but rendered with stucco. In 1789 it was decided to case the walls in Portland stone as part of a major programme of renovation, which Thomas Hardwick was chosen to supervise. At the same time the tiled roof was replaced with slate, the dormer windows, added in the 1640s, were removed, and the archways flanking the church, originally of stuccoed brick, were replaced with stone replicas. When Hardwick's stone facing was removed from the church in 1888, it was found to be a thin covering less than three inches thick, poorly bonded to the brick. The building was then reclad in the present unrendered red brick.

There were originally six or seven steps leading up to the portico, but these disappeared as the level of the Piazza was raised gradually over the years. By 1823 there were only two steps visible, and none by 1887. The arches at the side of the portico were substantially widened and raised during a restoration of 1878–82 by Henry Clutton, The 9th Duke of Bedford's architect. Clutton also removed the bell-turret over the western pediment.

The interior is a single space, undivided by piers or columns. The eastern third was originally marked out as a chancel by means of the floor being raised by one step. The level was raised further during alterations by William Butterfield in 1871–72. The church was built without galleries, but they were soon added on three sides. Hardwick included them in his rebuilding, and the western one remains today.

To the sides of the portico there were two elaborate pedimented gateways to the churchyard that were removed, then replaced, continuing the "Tuscan" style. Plans and historical images show a variety of relatively small structures rising from the roof, some shown housing bells. The roof is now completely bare, and two bells can be seen in recesses cut high on the western facade.

The portico was a great inspiration for Roger Morris (1695–1749) when designing the stable block for Althorp House, Northamptonshire, which is believed to have been built between 1732 and 1733. In the Palladian style and constructed of local ironstone, the east and north sides of the stables feature the deep porticos, both of which face the house. Many architectural historians have expressed the view that the stables are of more architectural importance than the house itself, which is rather more plain in comparison as a result of many centuries of alterations, including a major exterior renovation by Henry Holland (1745-1806) in the 1790s.

== Theatrical connections ==
St Paul's connection with the theatre began as early as 1663 with the establishment of the Theatre Royal, Drury Lane, and was further assured in 1723 with the opening of Covent Garden Theatre, now the Royal Opera House.

On 9 May 1662, Samuel Pepys noted in his diary the first "Italian puppet play" under the portico—the first recorded performance of "Punch and Judy", a fact commemorated by the annual MayFayre service in May.

The portico of St Paul's was the setting for the first scene of Shaw's Pygmalion, the play that was later adapted as My Fair Lady. Since 2007 St Paul's has been home to its own in-house professional theatre company, Iris Theatre, originally created to mount a production of T. S. Eliot's Murder in the Cathedral. It gained full charitable status in October 2009.

== Baptisms, burials and memorials ==
The artist J. M. W. Turner and dramatist Sir William S. Gilbert (of Gilbert and Sullivan fame) were both baptised at St Paul's.

Samuel Butler (1613–1680), of Hudibras fame, was buried at St Paul's, Covent Garden. Aubrey in Brief Lives describes his grave as "being in the north part next to the church at the east end ... 2 yards distant from the pillaster of the dore". His grave was never marked. A monument to him was placed in Westminster Abbey in 1732 by a printer with the surname Barber, and the Lord Mayor of London.

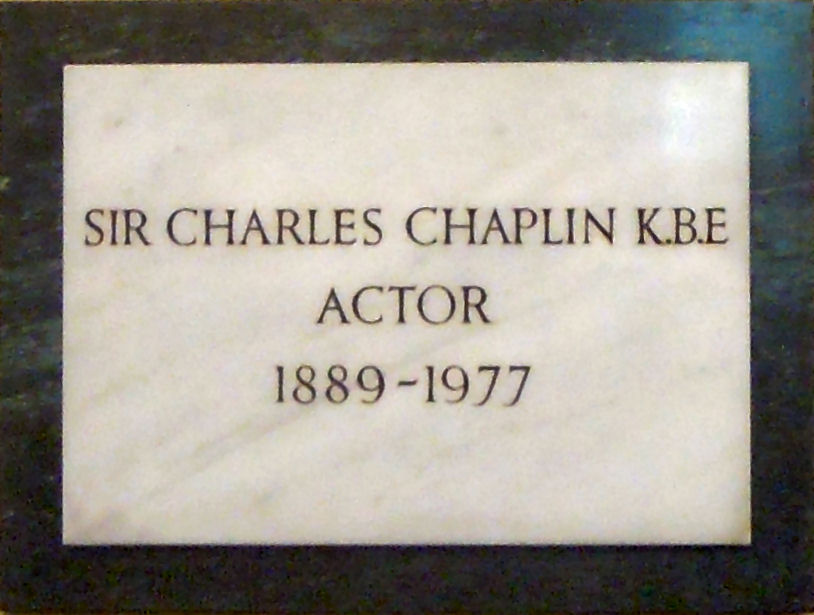
Charlie Chaplin memorial plaque in St Paul's, Convent Garden

Among others also buried at St Paul's, Covent Garden, are the wood-carver Grinling Gibbons, the painters Thomas Murray, Sir Peter Lely, and Thomas Girtin, Thomas Arne (composer of "Rule Britannia"), and Sir Henry Herbert who as Master of the Revels to James I and Charles I was a censor of the theatre. A memorial tablet in the church commemorates Charles Macklin, the great Shakespearean actor from Ulster. The ashes of Dames Ellen Terry and Edith Evans rest in St Paul's.

Memorials in the church are dedicated to many famous entertainment personalities of the 20th century, including Sir Charlie Chaplin, Sir Noël Coward, Dame Gracie Fields, Stanley Holloway, Boris Karloff, Vivien Leigh, Ivor Novello, Richard Greene, Kenneth More, Diana Rigg, and Richard Beckinsale. The Avenue of Stars, which commemorated many notable figures and groups from the entertainment industry, formerly passed outside the church. There is also a memorial plaque to music hall star Bransby Williams which was unveiled by Sir Michael Redgrave. The church is surrounded by an award-winning graveyard garden, in which Redgrave's ashes were scattered. The churchyard closed to burials in 1852.

== Notable events ==
In the 1980s, the site directly outside the church was where the then Greater London Council, soon to be abolished, liked to showcase bands, as part of its "Street Performers" policy for using public open spaces, and the Council then controlled the Covent Garden Piazza. On Sunday, 1 April 1984, the first samba school in Britain, the London School of Samba (LSS), performed its first ever public concert on this site. Its second concert, on Saturday, 7 April 1984, also took place outside the church. The LSS had been formed on 31 January 1984 and was considered to be the Madrinha, or "godmother", of samba in the United Kingdom. Later in 1984, the LSS was also the first school of samba to parade in the Notting Hill Carnival.

John Whitworth, a professor at the Guildhall School of Music, was organist of the church from 1965 to 1971.

== Orchestra ==
Covent Garden Sinfonia (known as the Orchestra of St Paul's until June 2017) is a professional chamber orchestra resident at the Actors' Church. In addition to a concert series in Covent Garden, the orchestra gives performances all around the UK and makes regular visits to the Southbank Centre, Cadogan Hall and St John's, Smith Square. Based around a core of principal players, Covent Garden Sinfonia adapts to each project, ranging in size from a small ensemble to a full symphony orchestra of 70 or more. The orchestra's Artistic Director is Ben Palmer and its patron is Sir Roger Norrington.

== Rectors of St Paul's, Covent Garden ==
- 1646–1656 Obadiah Sedgwick
- 1656–1662 Thomas Manton (ejected in the Great Ejection)
- 1662–1689 Simon Patrick (as Dean of Peterborough from 1679, later Bishop of Chichester then Ely)
- 1689–1707† Samuel Freeman (as Dean of Peterborough from 1691)
- 1708–1730† Robert Lumley Lloyd
- 1730–1754† Charles Tough
- 1754–1755 James Tattersall
- 1755–1758 John Cradock (as Bishop of Kilmore from 1757, later Archbishop of Dublin)
- 1758–1784† James Tattersall (2nd term)
- 1784–1809† Richard Bullock
- 1810–1817† Edward Embry
- 1817–1831† Francis Randolph
- 1831–1848 George Hull Bowers (as Dean of Manchester from 1847)
- 1848–1863† Henry Hutton
- 1863–1865† Charles Edward Oakley
- 1865–1873 Berdmore Compton
- 1873–1899† Samuel Francis Cumberlege
- 1899–1918† Edward Henry Mosse (killed in an air raid)
- 1918–1923 James Granville Adderley
- 1924–1944 Reginald Hart Davies
- 1944–1957† Vincent Howson
- 1957–1969† Clarence May
- 1969–1975 John Hester
- 1975–1984 F. John Arrow Smith
- 1986–1999 David Elliott
- 2000–2005 Mark Oakley
- 2006– Simon Grigg

† Rector died in post

== Gallery ==
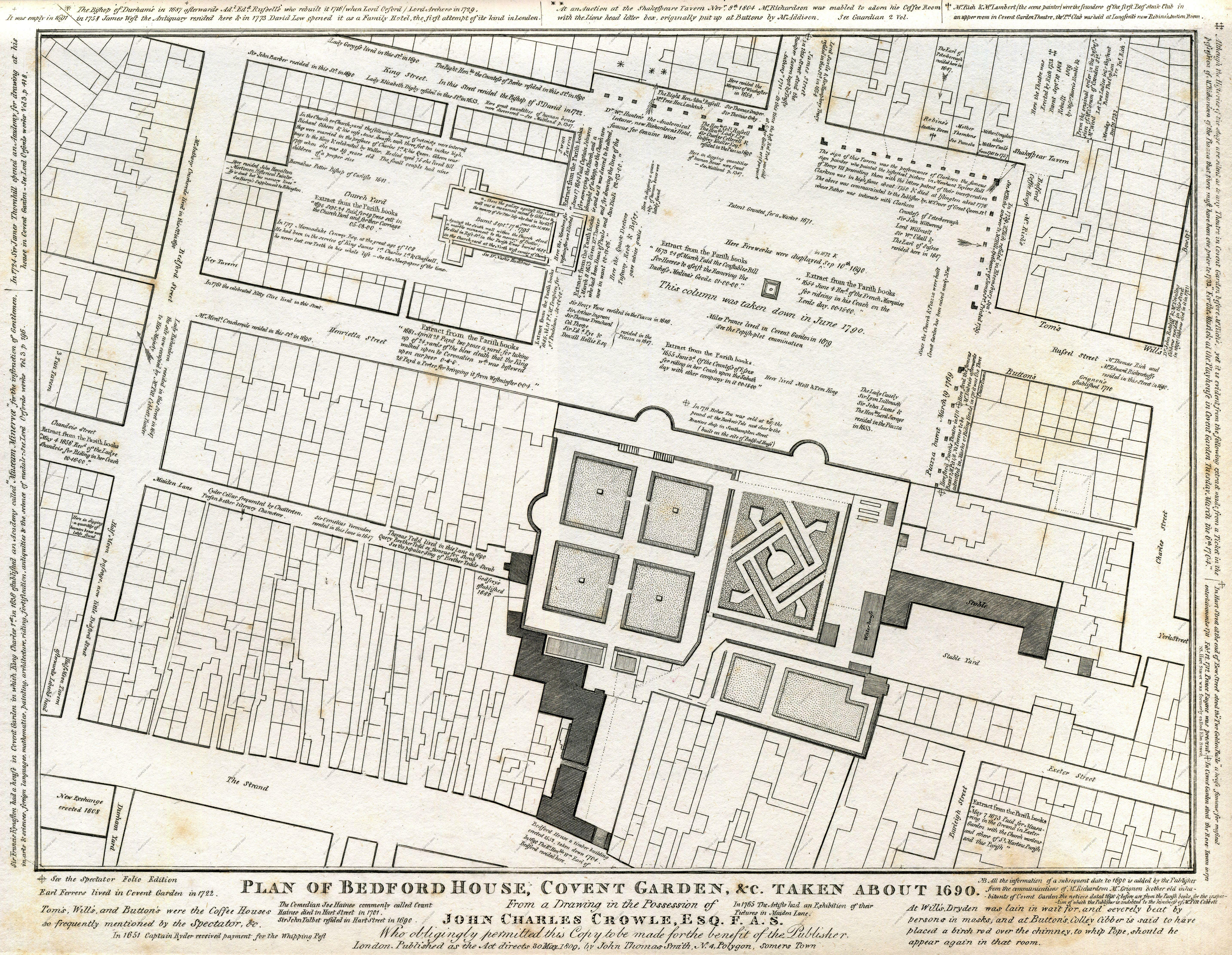
Map of Covent Garden, from a drawing of c. 1690

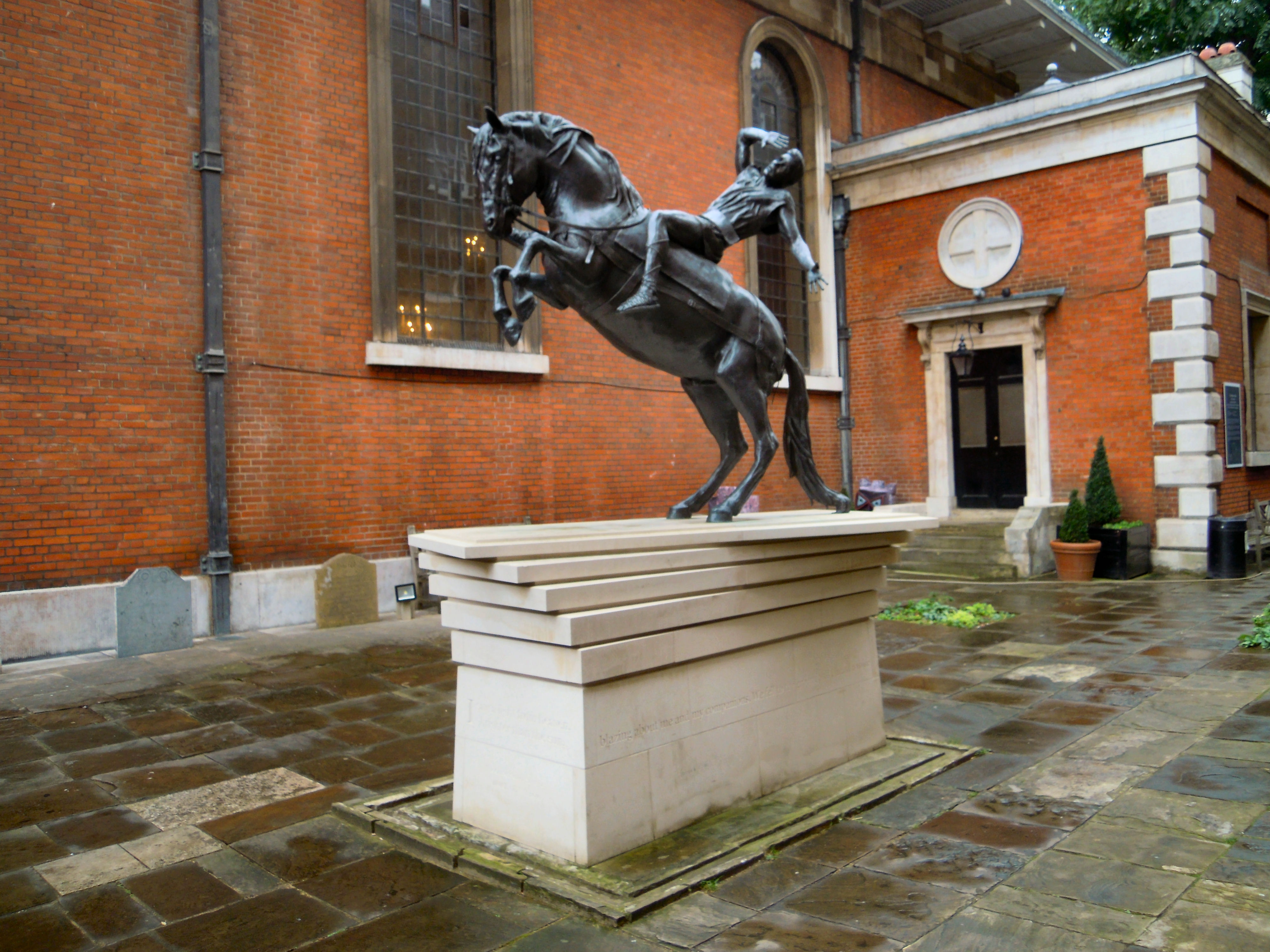
Statue of the Conversion of St Paul was sculpted by Bruce Denny and was unveiled by Dame Judi Dench

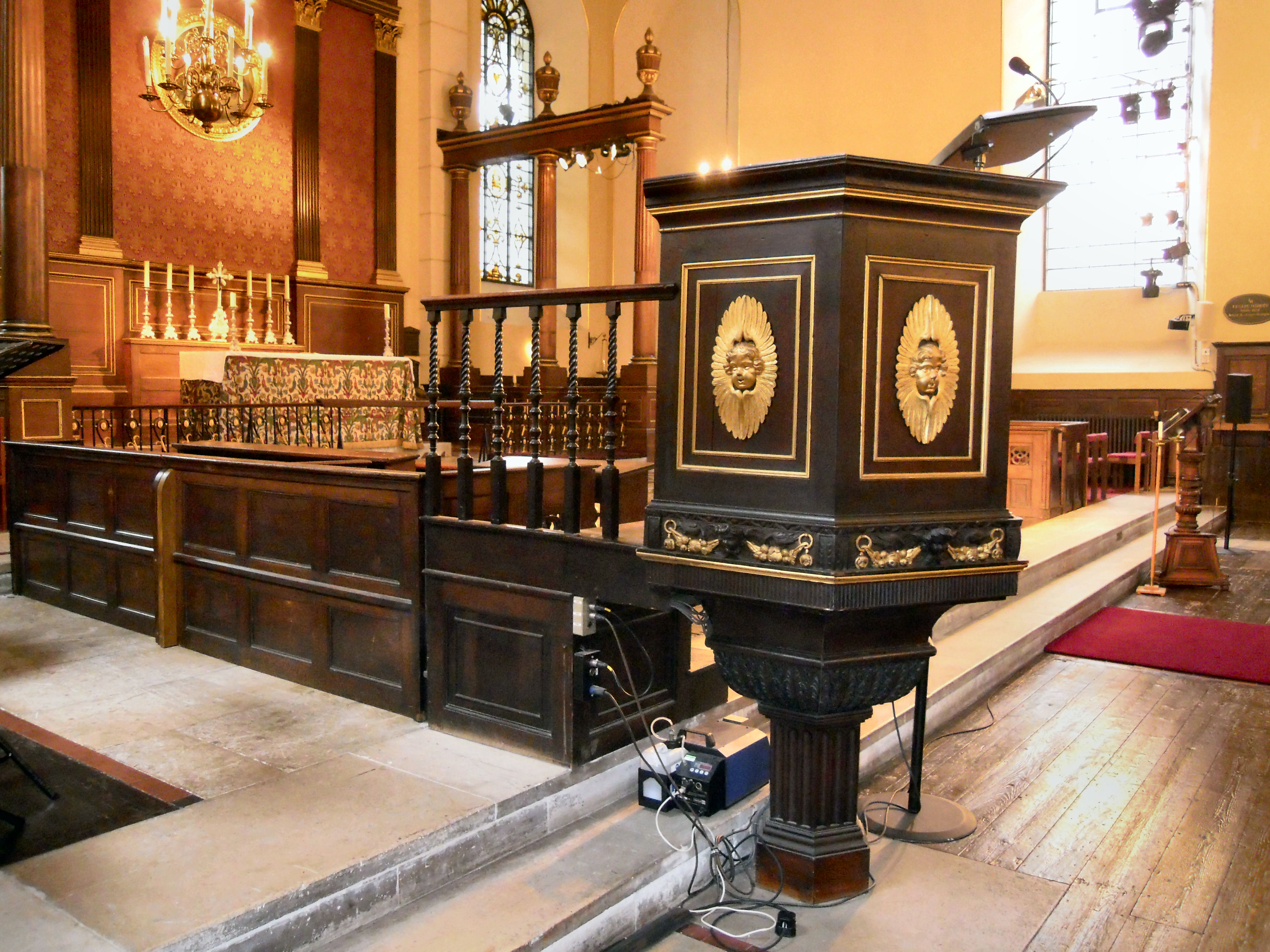
The pulpit was the work of Grinling Gibbons

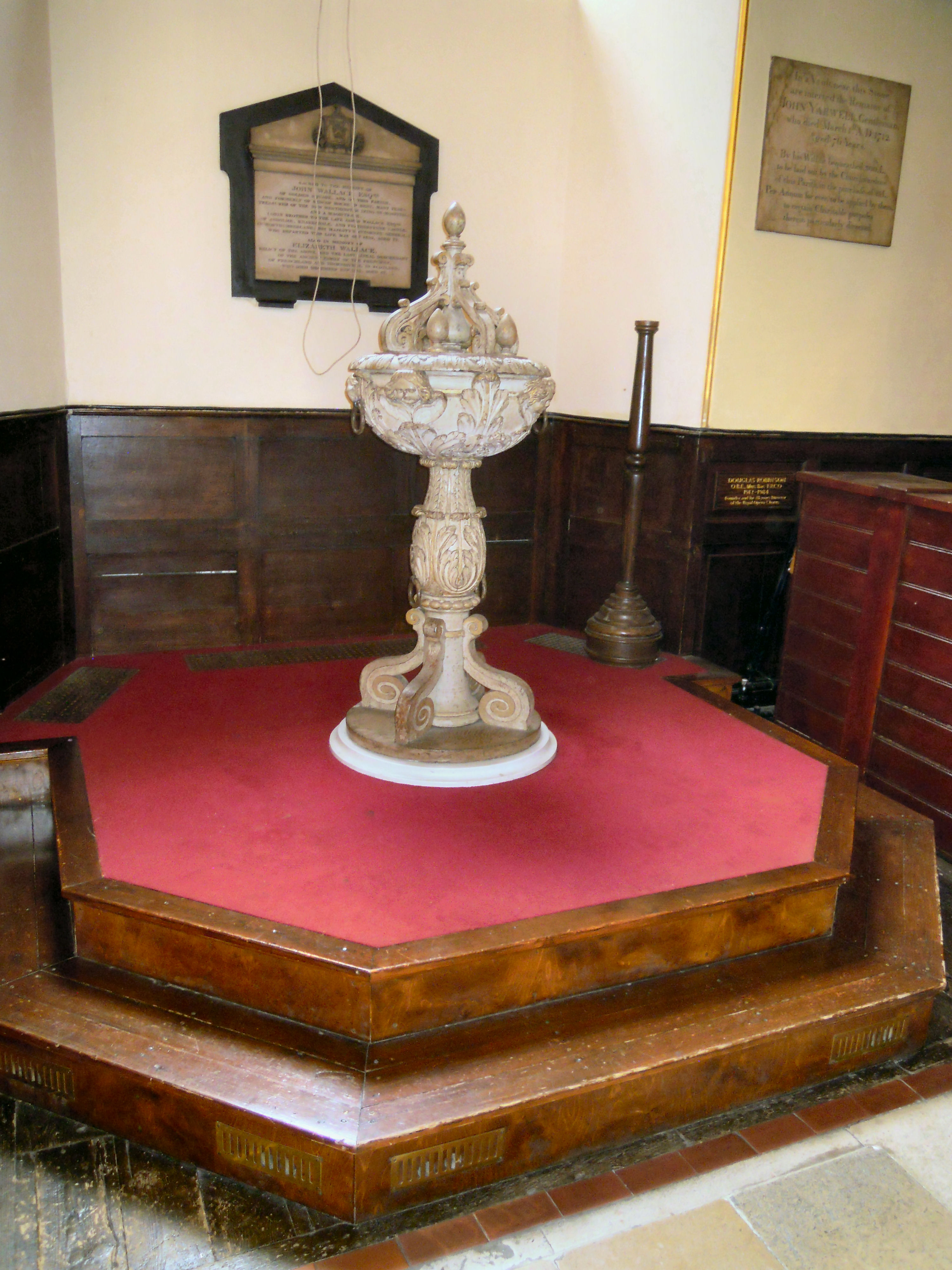
The font

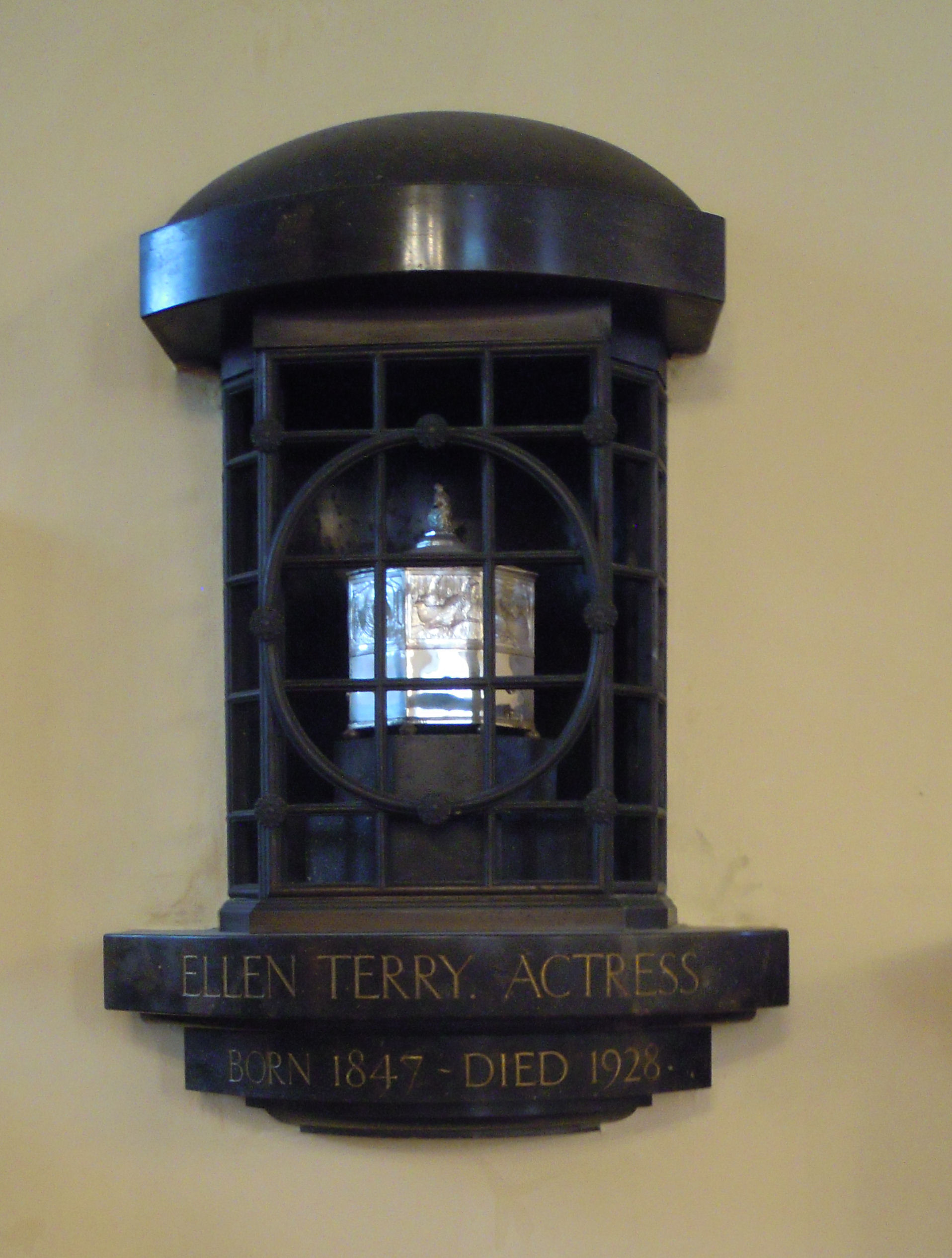
The ashes of Dame Ellen Terry

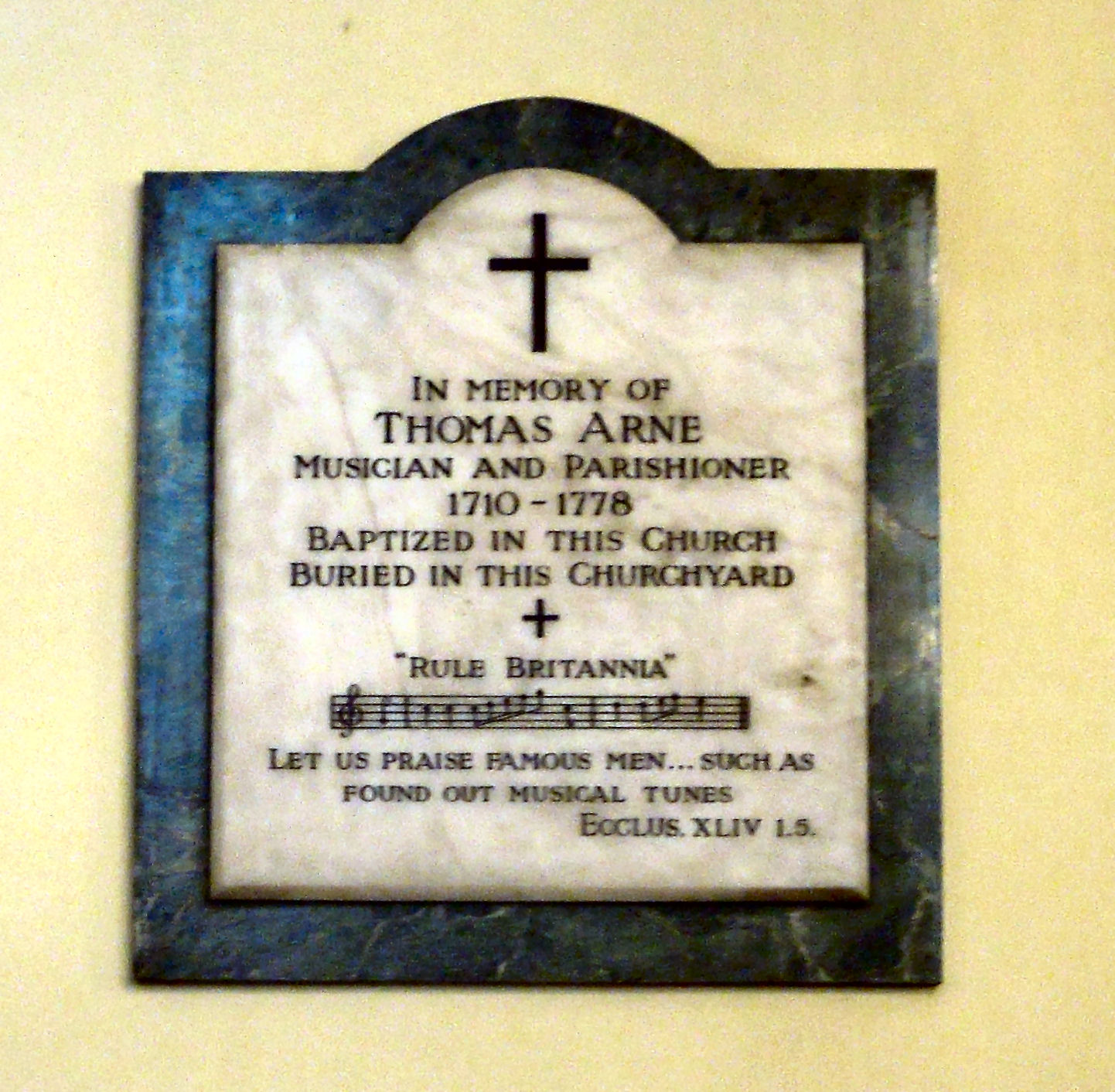
Memorial Plaque to composer Thomas Arne

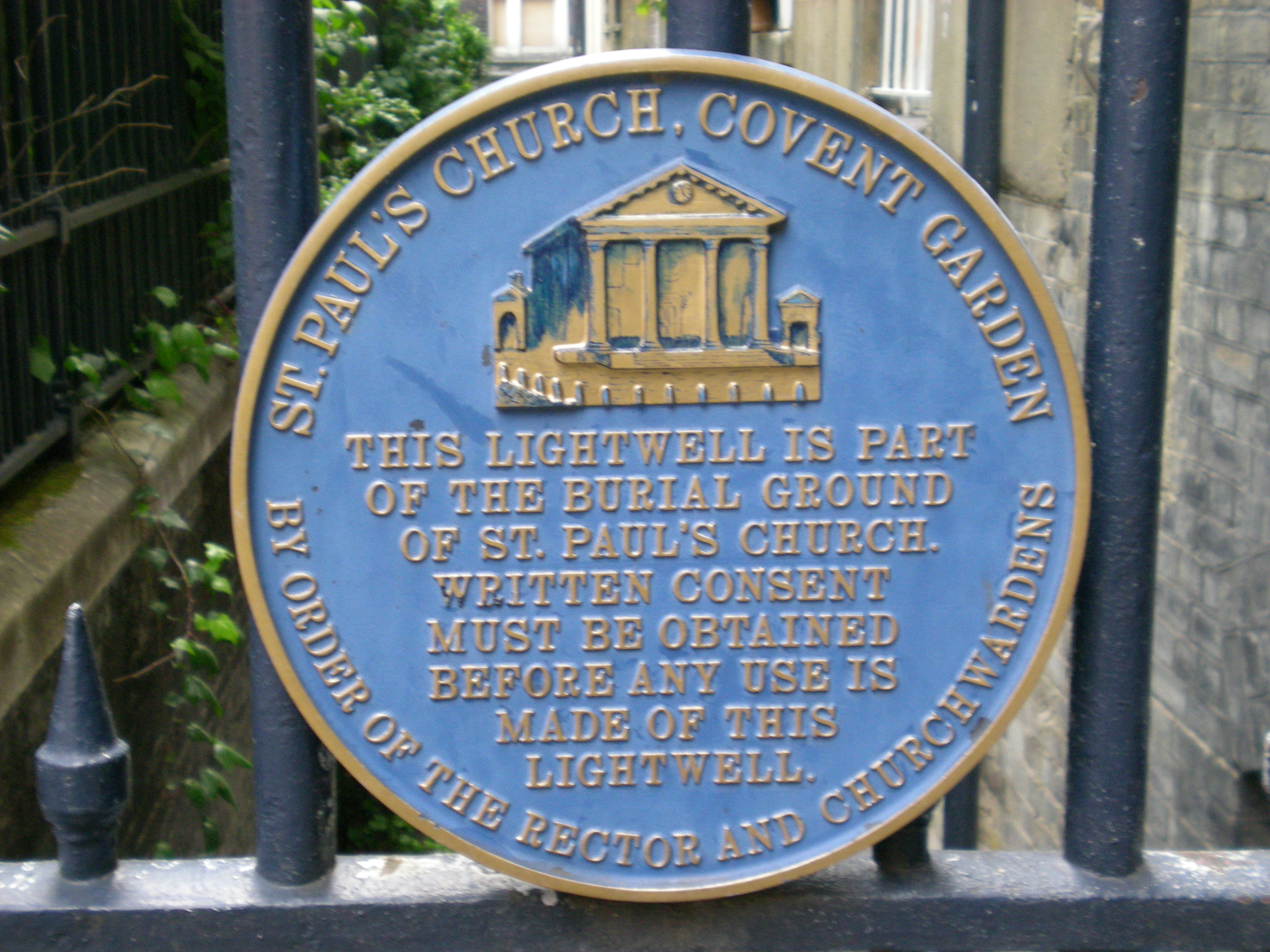
Plaque to the side of St Paul's Lightwell

== See also ==
- Berdmore Compton
- List of churches and cathedrals of London
- Crown Court Church – located nearby
- Saint Malachy's Roman Catholic Church, New York City, also known as the Actors' Church
- St. Lawrence's Church, Mereworth – partly modelled on this church.
