= Avenue of Stars, London =

Temporary walk of Fame in London, England

Coordinates: 51°30′42″N 0°7′24″W

The Avenue of Stars was a version of the Hollywood Walk of Fame in London, England. It opened in 2005 with one hundred names, and was a temporary installation to accompany a TV show to celebrate ITV's 50th birthday. The Avenue of Stars was a walkway through Covent Garden passing St Paul's Church, commonly known as the "Actors' Church". It honoured individuals or groups from the entertainment industry with notable achievements. As on the Hollywood Walk of Fame, the individual or group was represented by a five-pointed star containing the name set into the walkway. To qualify for a star, the individual or group had to have been from the United Kingdom, Ireland, or a Commonwealth nation.

The first inductee onto the Avenue of Stars was Jimmy Page, guitarist with Led Zeppelin. In 2006, all of the stars were removed, because the Avenue had been a temporary anniversary installation laid on boards and sand on top of the historic surface, and only the old flagstones are now visible again in the courtyard. American singer/songwriter Is'real Benton formed a U.S.-based eponymous foundation to restore the Walk of Fame.

== List of stars on the London Avenue of Stars ==
- Alfred Hitchcock
- The Beatles
- The Sex Pistols
- Trevor McDonald
- Maggie Smith
- Coronation Street
- Richard Attenborough
- Charles Chaplin
- Ant & Dec
- Victoria Wood
- Cliff Richard
- Gracie Fields
- Christopher Lee
- Cary Grant
- Hugh Grant
- John Mills
- Alec Guinness
- Rex Harrison
- Bob Geldof
- Laurence Olivier
- The Rolling Stones
- Glenda Jackson
- Peter Ustinov
- Nicole Kidman
- Michael Palin
- Cilla Black
- Julie Walters
- Frankie Howerd
- Ian McKellen
- Ralph Richardson
- David Frost
- Peter O'Toole
- Alan Whicker
- John Gielgud
- Tony Hancock
- Peggy Ashcroft
- David Bowie
- The Bee Gees
- Pink Floyd
- Shirley Bassey
- Edith Evans
- Ken Dodd
- Tommy Cooper
- Benny Hill
- Stan Laurel
- Lenny Henry
- Eric Sykes
- Dame Edna Everage
- Harry Secombe
- The Two Ronnies
- John Cleese
- Thora Hird
- Arthur Lowe
- Leonard Rossiter
- Paul Eddington
- Chris Tarrant
- John Thaw
- Robbie Coltrane
- Sean Connery
- Judi Dench
- Michael Caine
- Jimmy Page
- Margot Fonteyn
- Anthony Hopkins
- Julie Andrews
- Charles Laughton
- Queen
- Robbie Williams
- Errol Flynn
- Michael Gambon
- Noël Coward
- Richard Briers
- Alan Bates
- Bob Hope
- The Kinks
- Vera Lynn
- Brenda Blethyn
- Peter Cook
- Les Dawson
- Rowan Atkinson
- Peter Sellers
- Bruce Forsyth
- Spike Milligan
- David Jason
- Ricky Gervais
- Albert Finney
- Morecambe and Wise
- Diana Rigg
- Nigel Hawthorne
- Kenneth Branagh
- David Niven
- Kiri Te Kanawa
- Roger Moore
- Elizabeth Taylor
- Billy Connolly
- Richard Burton
- Alan Bennett
- Dirk Bogarde
- Alicia Markova
- Helen Mirren
- Yehudi Menuhin
- Eric Clapton
- Tom Jones
- Engelbert Humperdinck
- Simon Cowell
- Phillip Schofield
- Piers Morgan
- Amanda Holden

== See also ==
- Culture of London
