= Covent Garden Market (painting) =

Painting by Balthazar Nebot

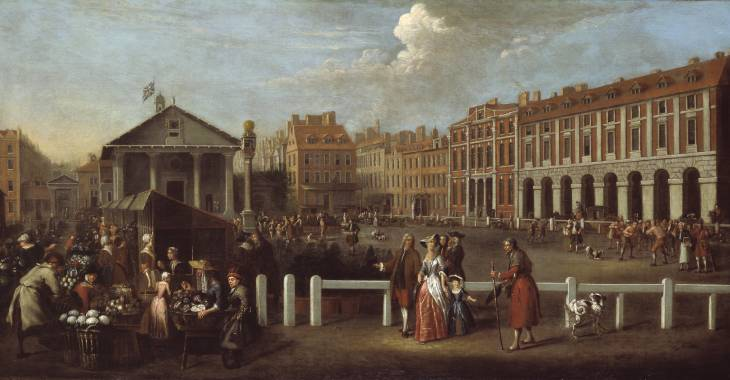
- Artist: Balthazar Nebot
- Year: 1737
- Type: Oil on canvas, landscape painting
- Dimensions: 64.8 cm × 122.8 cm (25.5 in × 48.3 in)
- Location: Tate Britain; London

Covent Garden Market is a 1737 landscape painting by the artist Balthazar Nebot. It depicts a view of Covent Garden Market in Central London] facing westwards St Paul's Church designed by Inigo Jones a century earlier. It depicts the busting fruit and vegetable stalls market. Comparatively little is known about the artist, although this has become one of the better-known images of early Georgian era

Today the painting is in the collection of the Tate Britain in Pimlico, having been acquired in 1895 by the National Gallery and later transferred to the Tate.

== Bibliography ==
- Hallet, Mark & Riding, Christine. Hogarth. Harry N. Abrams, 2006.
- Horning, Audrey. A Cultural History of Objects in the Age of Enlightenment. Bloomsbury Publishing, 2022.
