= Berdmore Compton =

English Anglican priest (1820–1908)

The Reverend Berdmore Compton
- Born: 1820
- Died: 3 January 1908 (aged 87–88)
- Education: Merton College, Oxford
- Spouse: Agnes Priscilla Drummond (m. 1851)
- Religion: Christianity (Anglican)
- Church: Church of England
- Congregations served: St Paul's, Covent Garden; All Saints, Margaret Street

Berdmore Compton (1820–1908) was an English Anglican priest most distinguished as vicar of All Saints, Margaret Street, from 1873 to 1886. Following education at Merton College, Oxford, he served as Rector of Barford, near Warwick, until beginning work at St Paul's, Covent Garden from 1865 to 1873. He began service at Margaret Street in 1873 and continued until 1886. At his death in 1907, he was a prebendary of St Paul's Cathedral.
