= Salon of 1737 =

1737 art exhibition in Paris

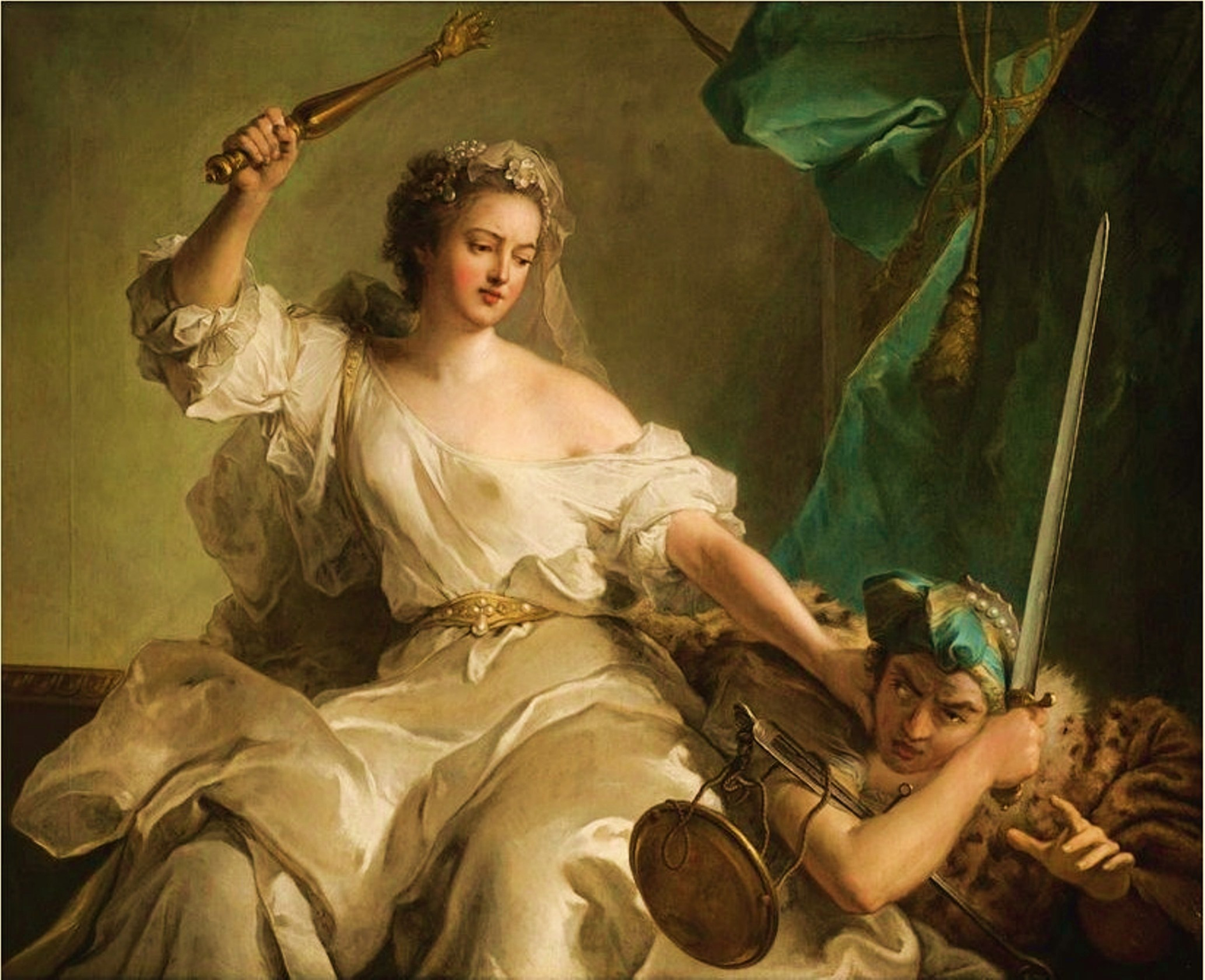
Justice Punishing Injustice by Jean-Marc Nattier

The Salon of 1737 was an art exhibition held at the Louvre in Paris, opening on the 18 August 1737. It was the first formal edition of the Salon to take place, although exhibitions had been taking place there since 1667. Significantly, for the first time the artworks were displayed in the Salon Carré, rather than at the Galerie d'Apollon providing a much greater space. The new venue gave its name both the Salon, which became the major art exhibition in France, as well as the practice of stacking pictures five of six high on the walls. Initially intended to be annual, it was held biannually for much of the eighteenth century.

The influential rococo painter François Lemoyne committed suicide shortly before the Salon was held, although several of his pupils including François Boucher and Charles-Joseph Natoire were prominent. Other major figures who would go on to dominate French art during the middle of the eighteenth century Jean Siméon Chardin, Maurice Quentin de La Tour, Jean-Marc Nattier and Charles-André van Loo all exhibited paintings at the Salon.

Jean-François de Troy displayed the genre painting Before the Ball and its companion piece After the Ball. Jean-Marc Nattier's exhibited the allegorical Justice Punishing Injustice. Charles-Antoine Coypel displayed the religious history painting Joseph Accused by Potiphar's Wife.

== Gallery ==
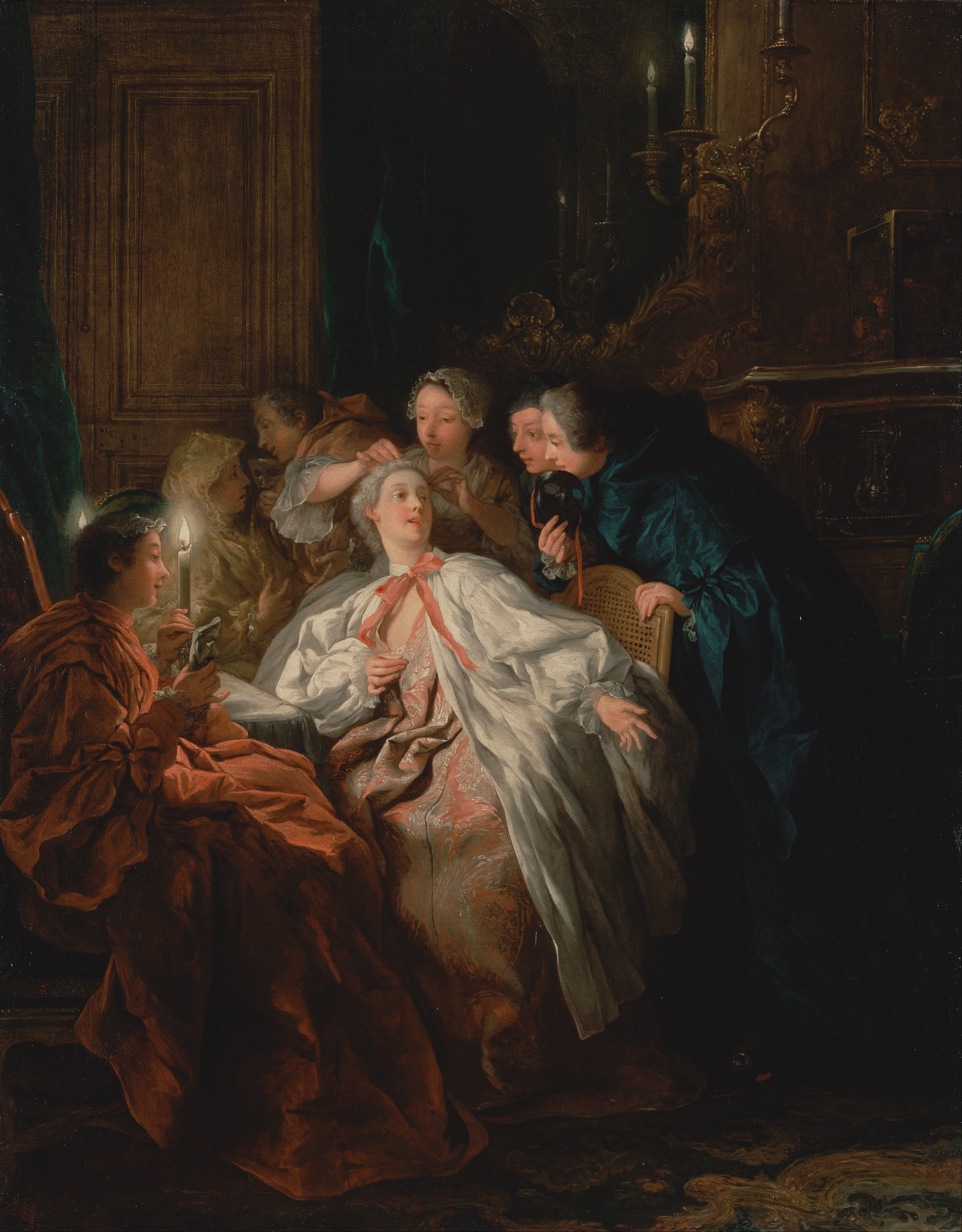
Before the Ball by Jean-François de Troy

After the Ball by Jean-François de Troy

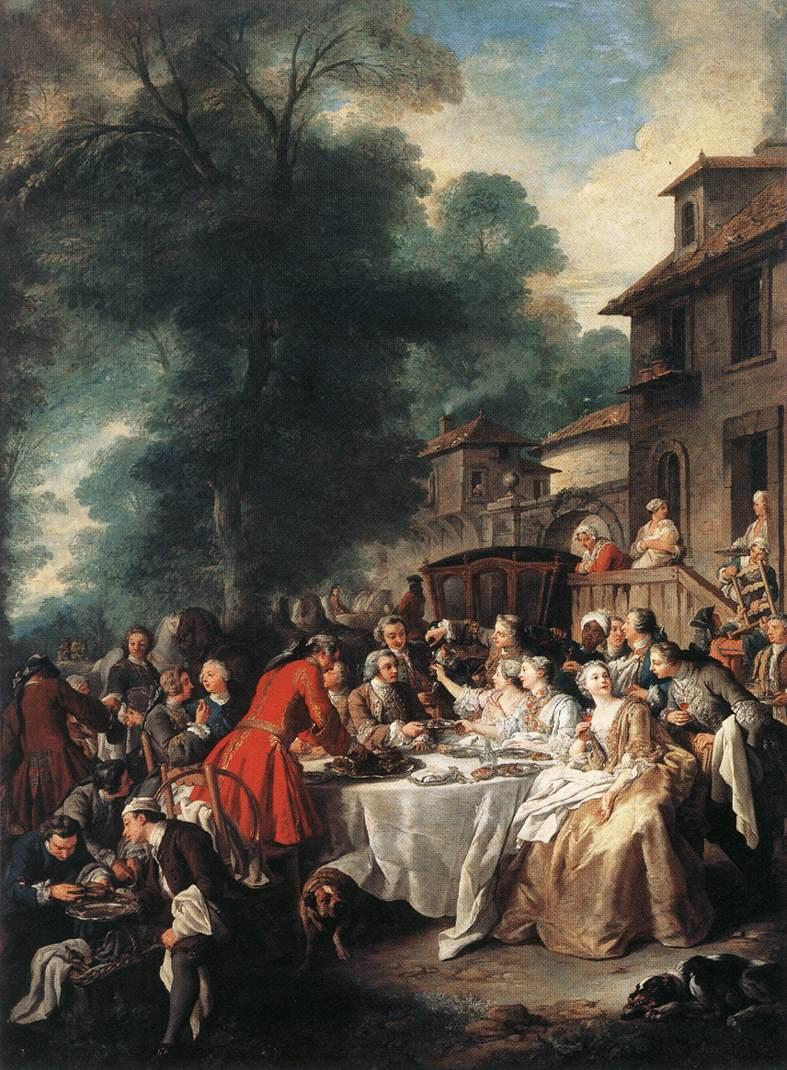
A Hunting Meal by Jean-François de Troy

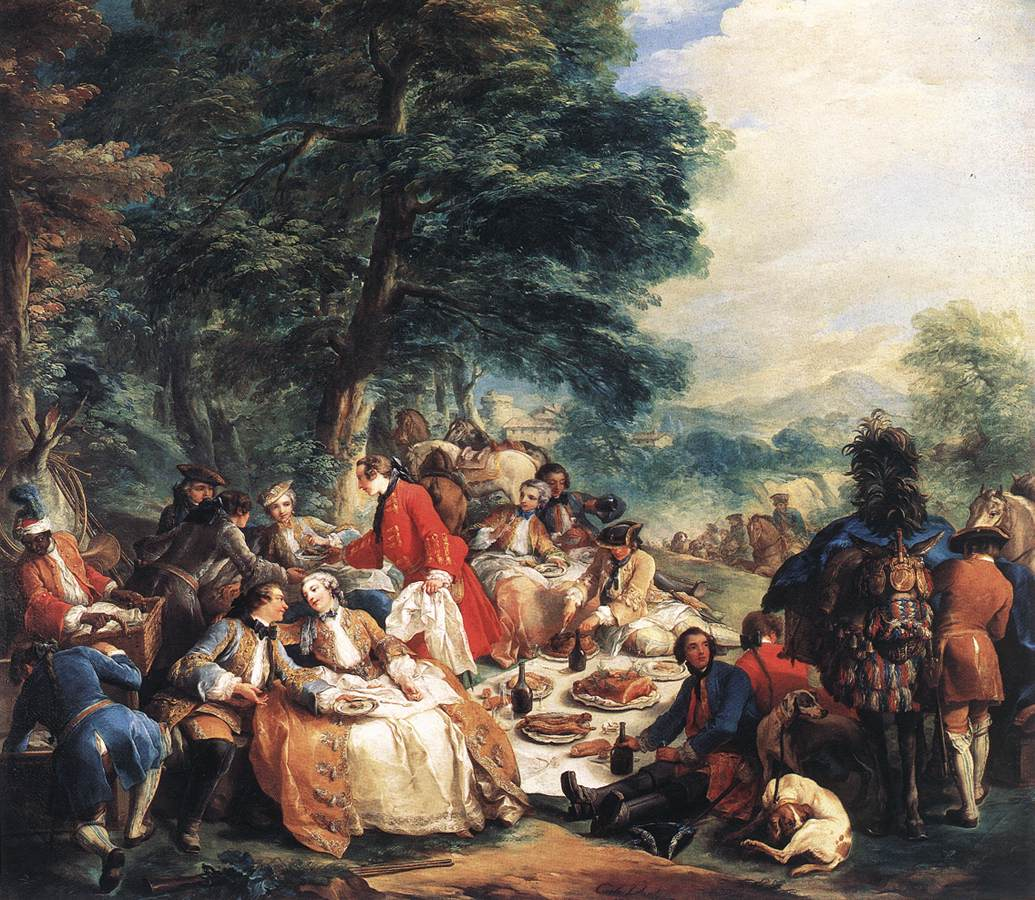
Halt During the Hunt by Charles-André van Loo

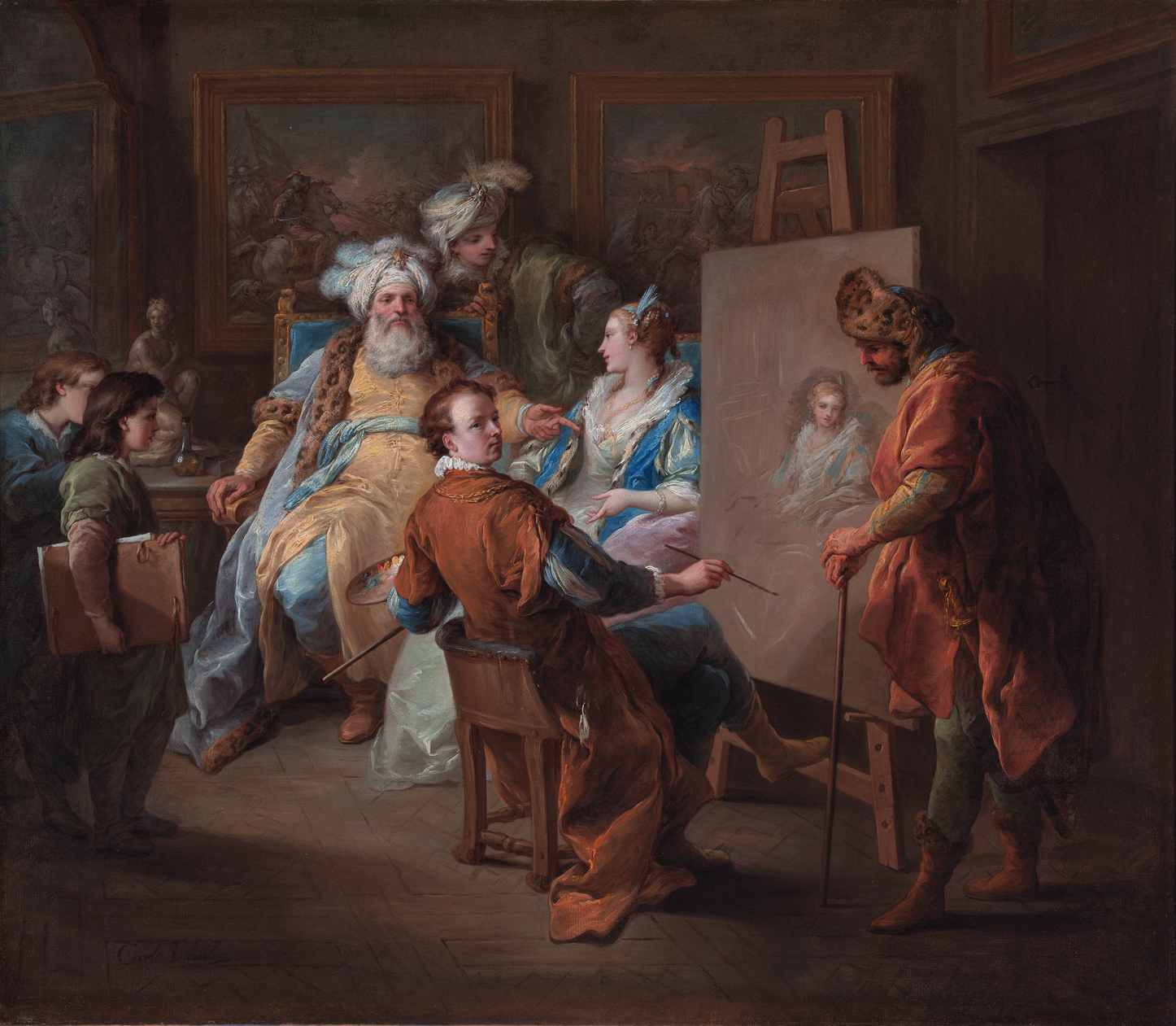
A Pasha Having His Mistress's Portrait Painted by Charles André van Loo

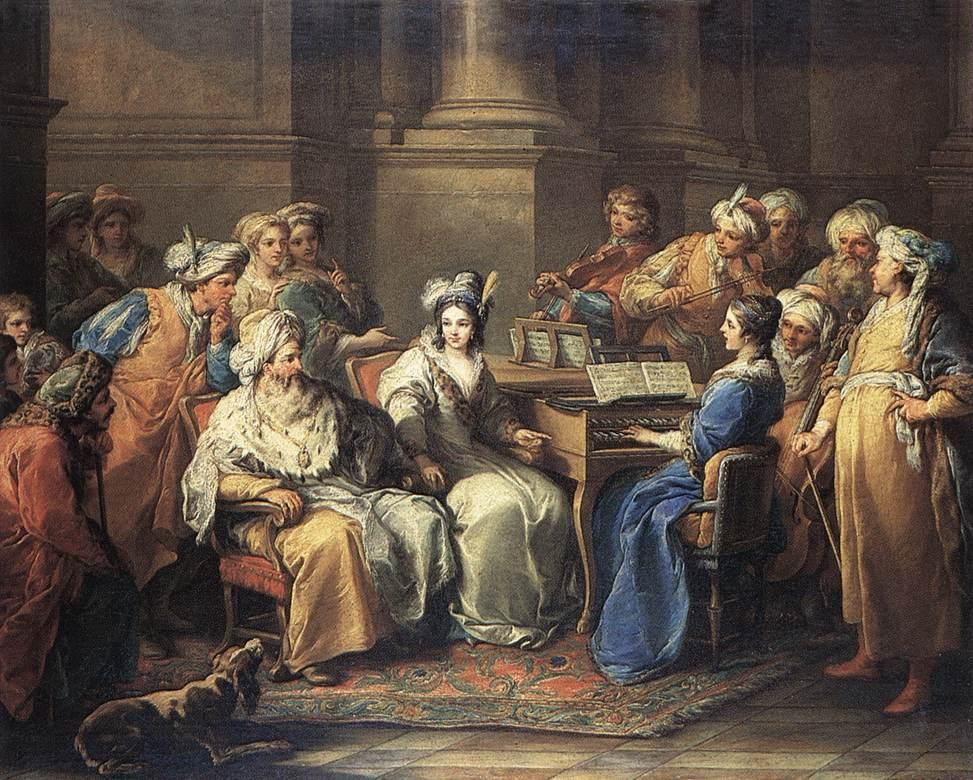
The Grand Turk Giving a Concert to his Mistress by Charles André van Loo

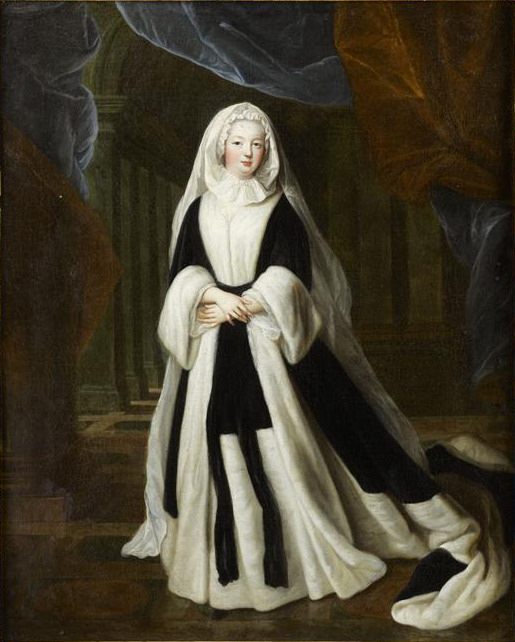
Louise Françoise, Princess of Condé as a Widow by Pierre Gobert

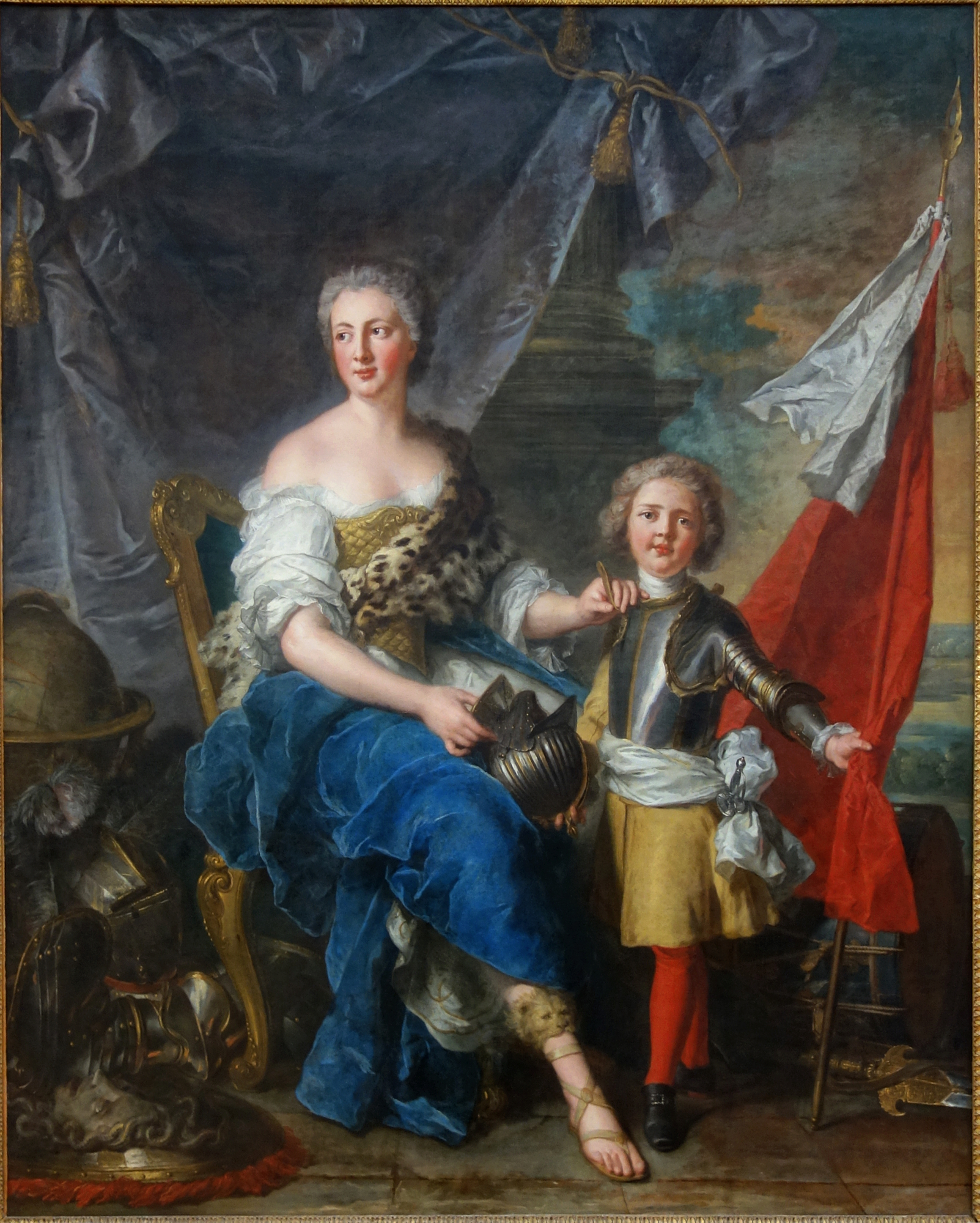
Mademoiselle de Lambesc and the Count de Brionne by Jean-Marc Nattier

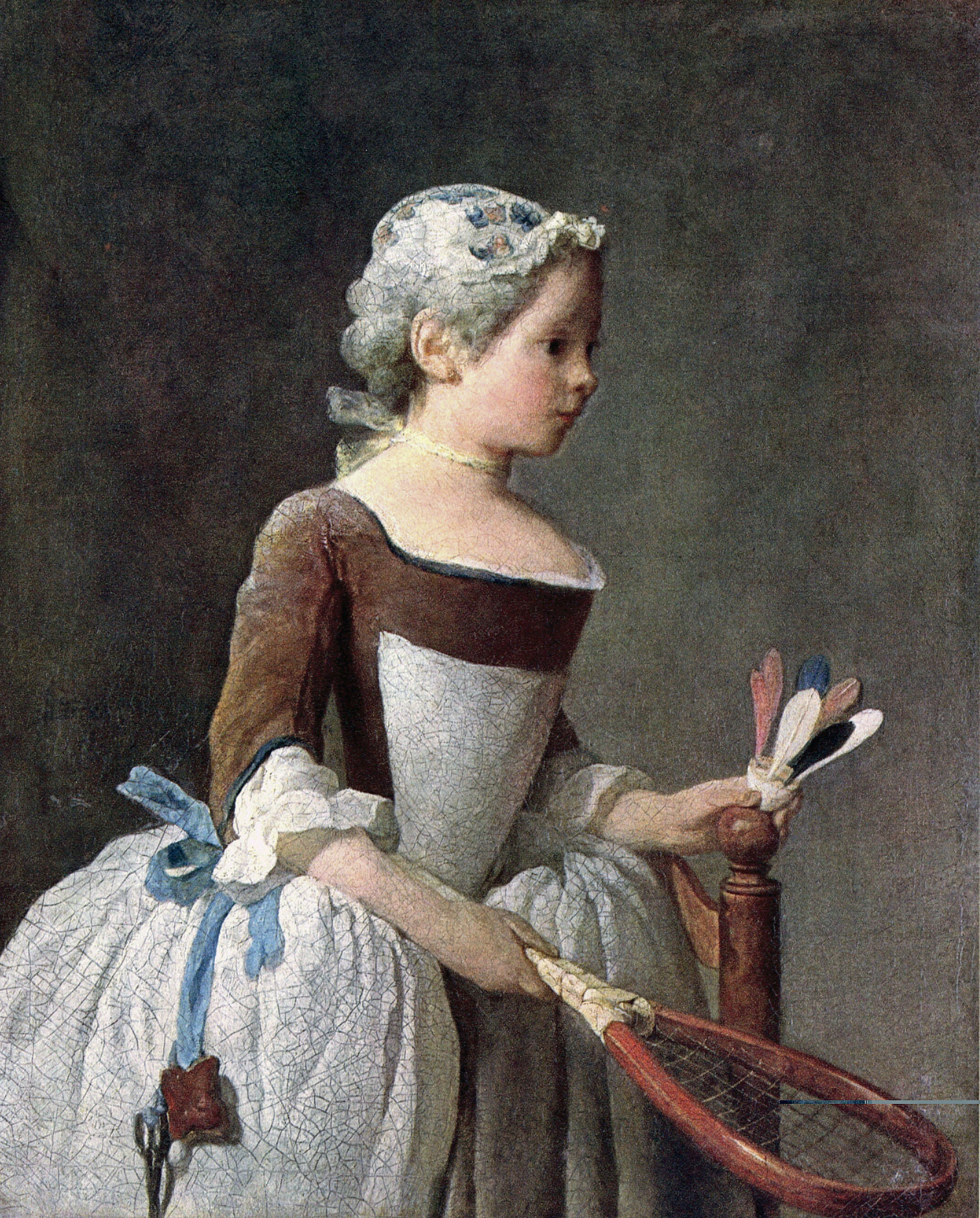
Girl with a Racquet by Jean Siméon Chardin

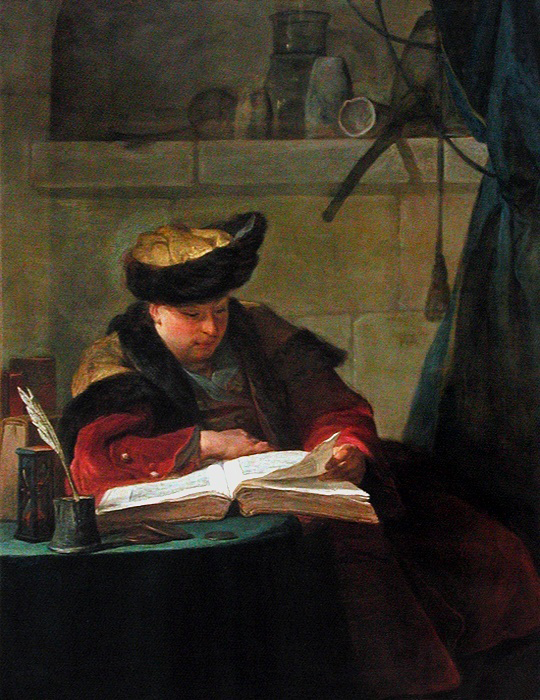
Portrait of Jacques Aved by Jean Siméon Chardin

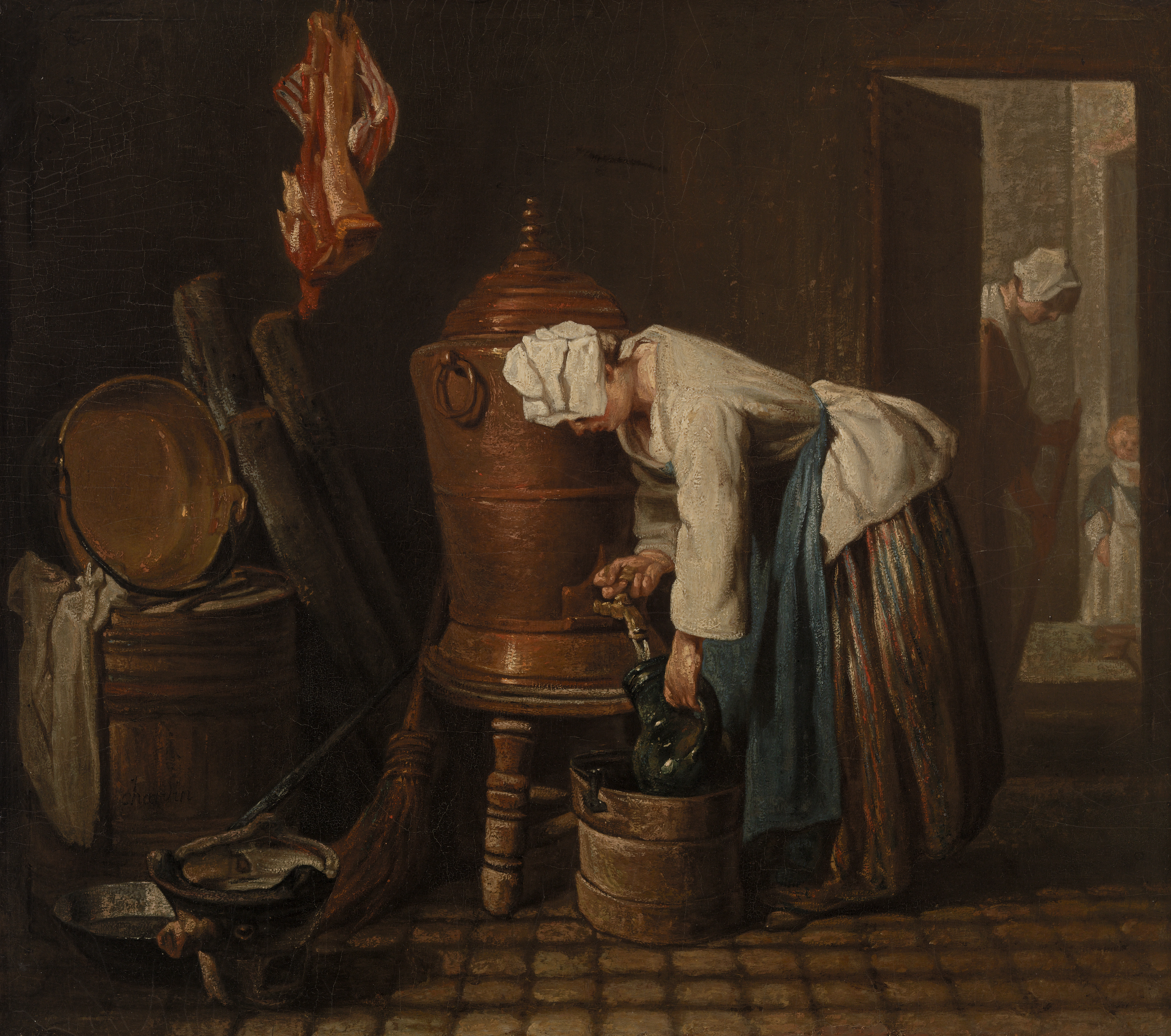
Woman Drawing Water from a Water Urn by Jean Siméon Chardin

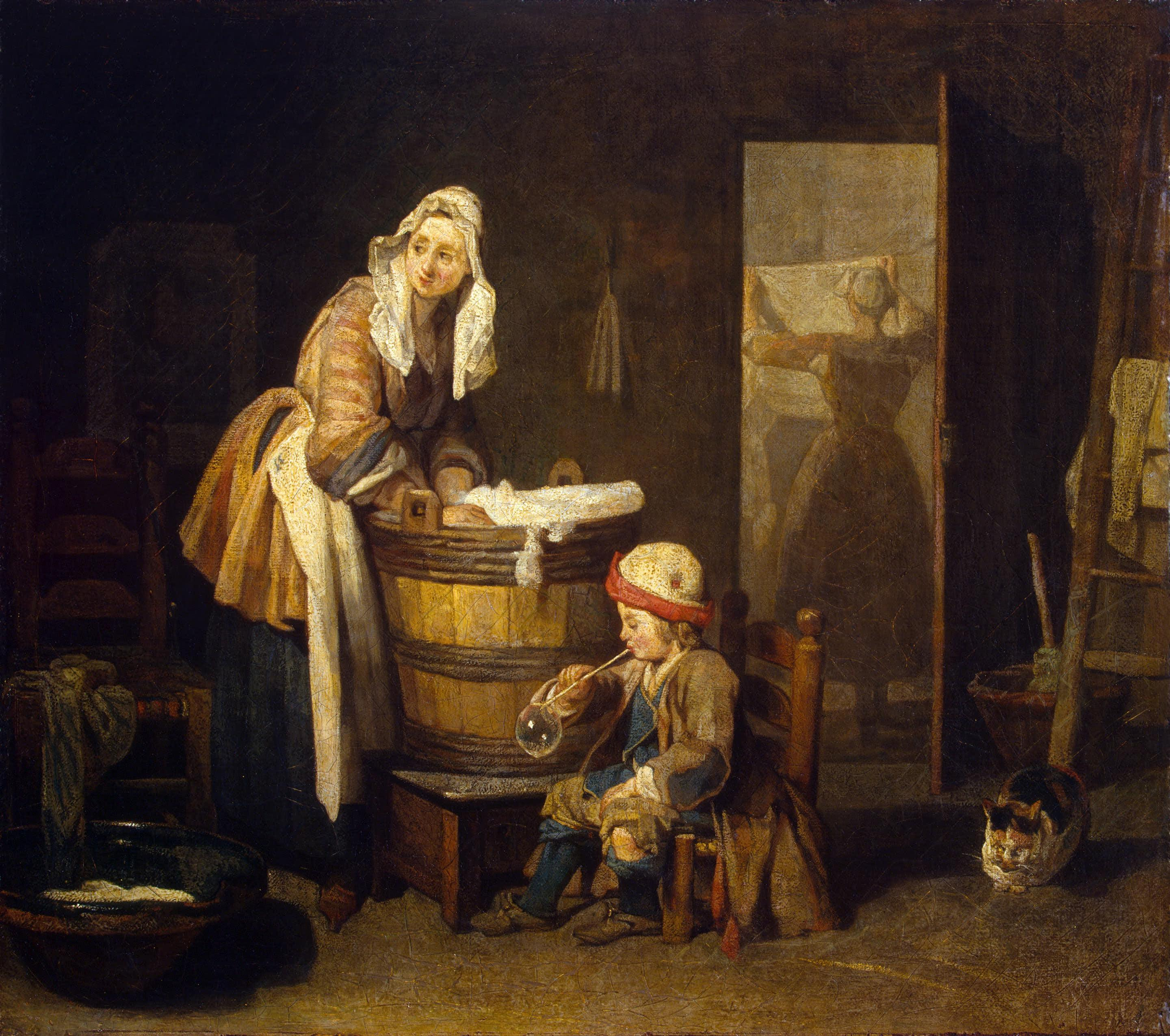
The Laundress by Jean Siméon Chardin

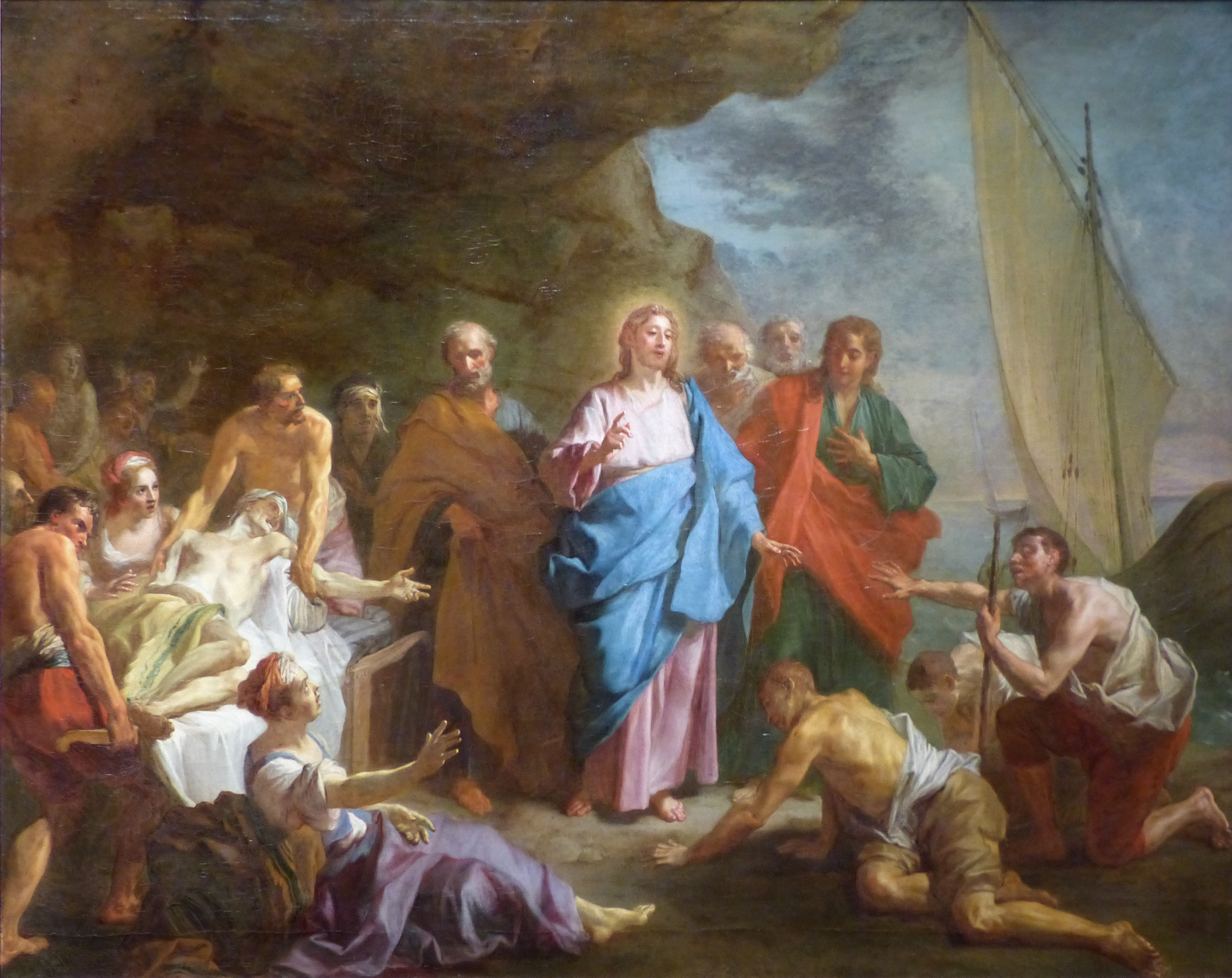
Christ Healing the Sick on the Shore of the Sea of Galilee by Pierre Dulin

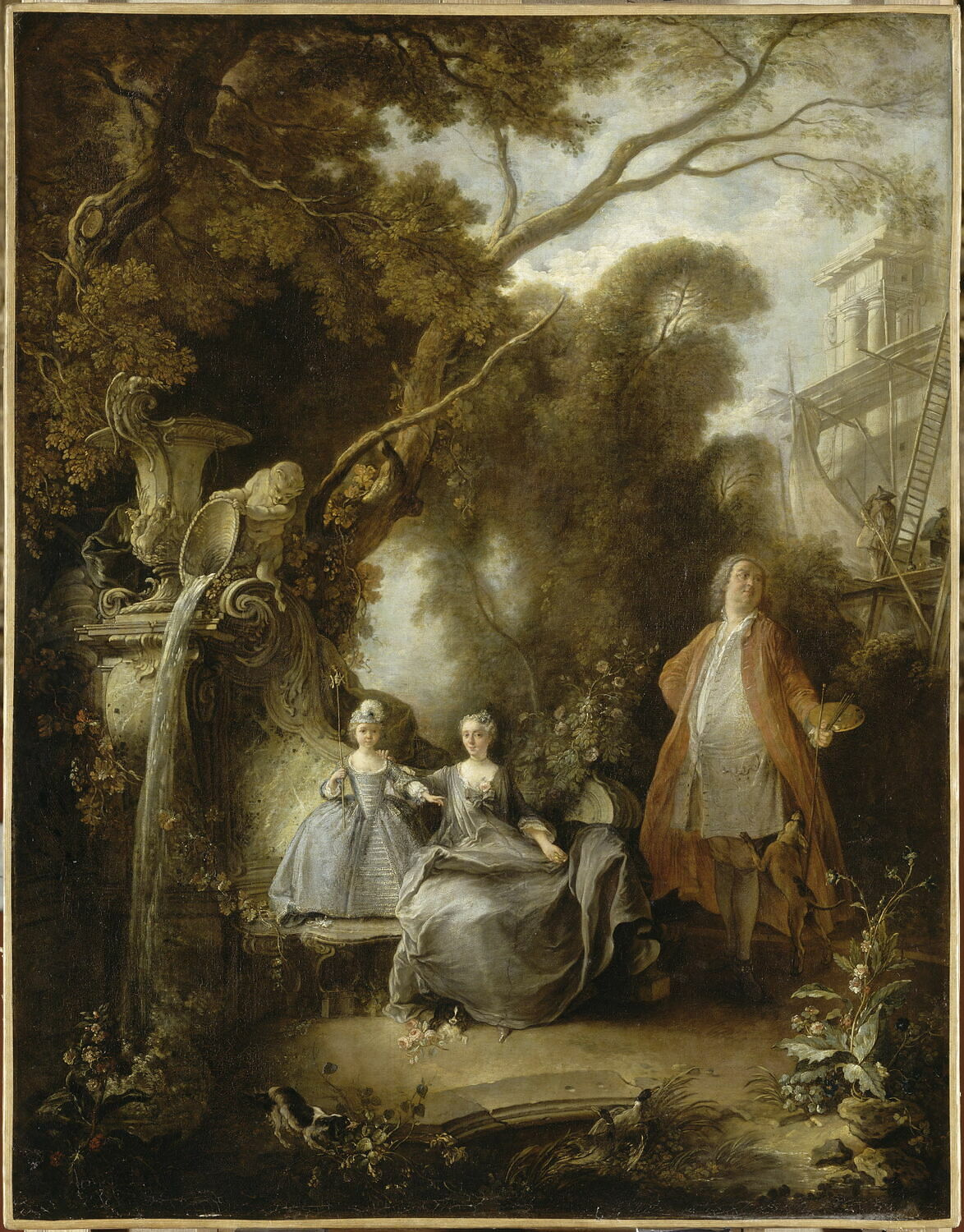
Self-Portrait with Family by Jacques de Lajoue

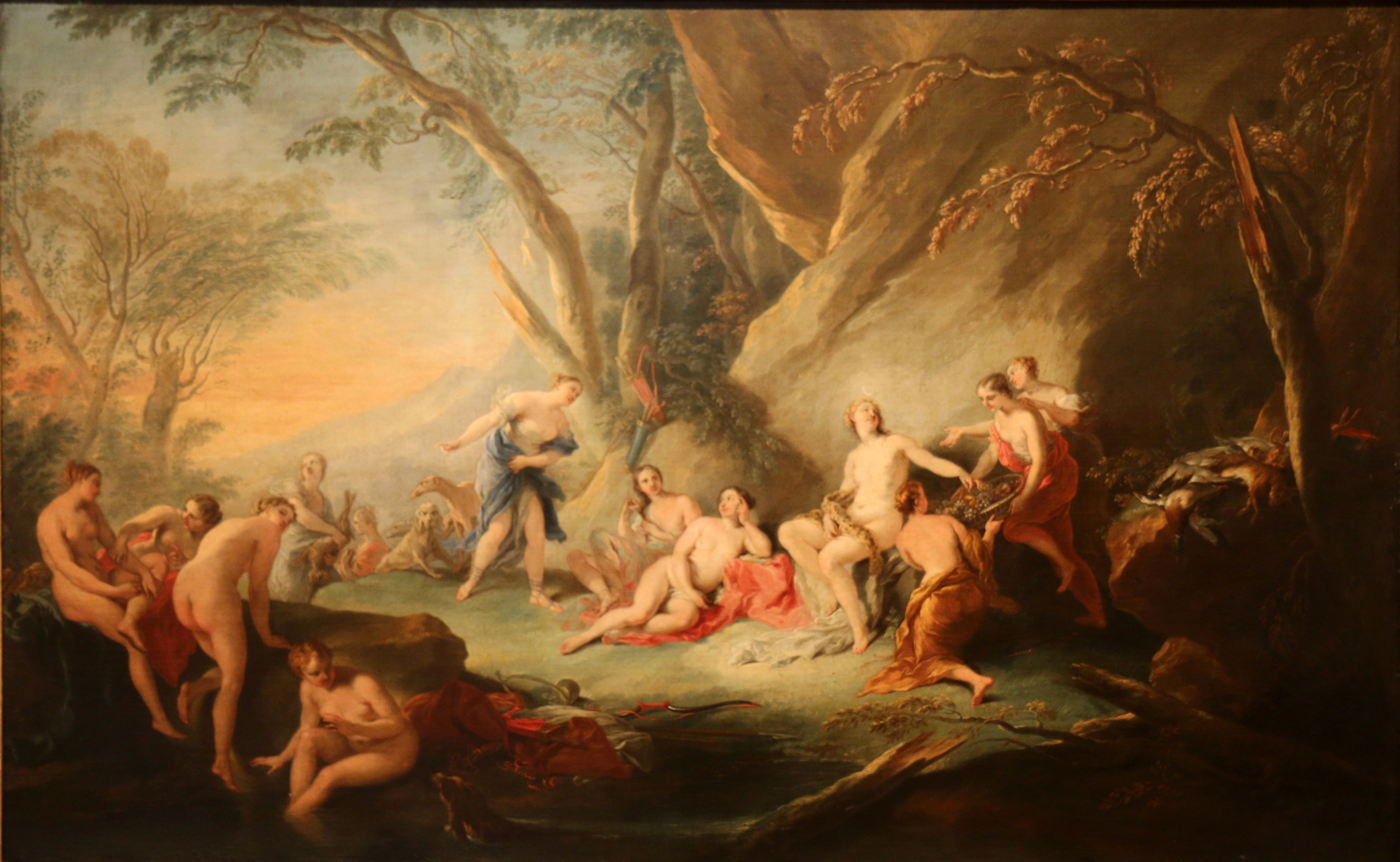
The Bath of Diana by Jean-Baptiste van Loo

Joseph Accused by Potiphar's Wife by Charles-Antoine Coypel

Roland and The Marriage Of Angelique by Charles-Antoine Coypel

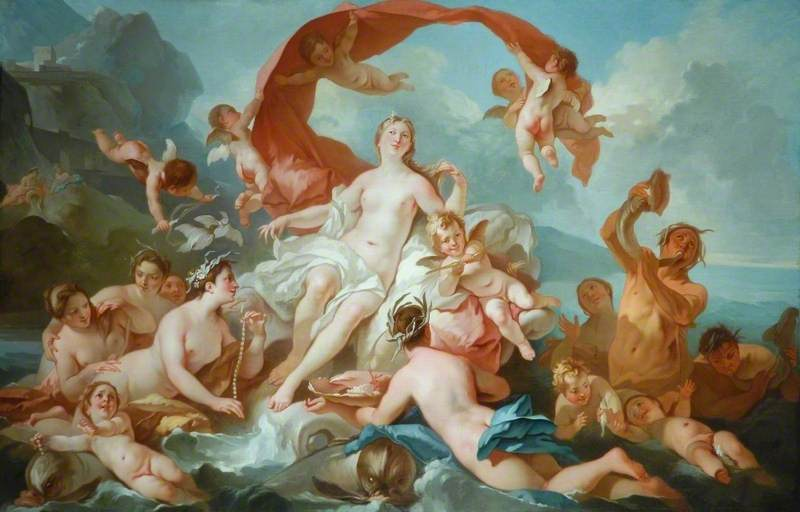
The Birth of Venus by Pierre-Jacques Cazes

L'évanouissement d'Esther by Jean-François de Troy

Le repas d'Énée et de Didon ou Énée chez Didon by Louis Galloche

== Bibliography ==
- Gardner, James. The Louvre: The Many Lives of the World's Most Famous Museum. Grove Press, 2020.
- Levey, Michael. Painting and Sculpture in France, 1700–1789. Yale University Press, 1993.
- Rosenberg, Pierre. Chardin. Royal Academy of Arts, 2000.
