= The Laundress (Chardin) =

1733 paintings by Jean Siméon Chardin

- Une petite femme s'occupant à savonner (French)
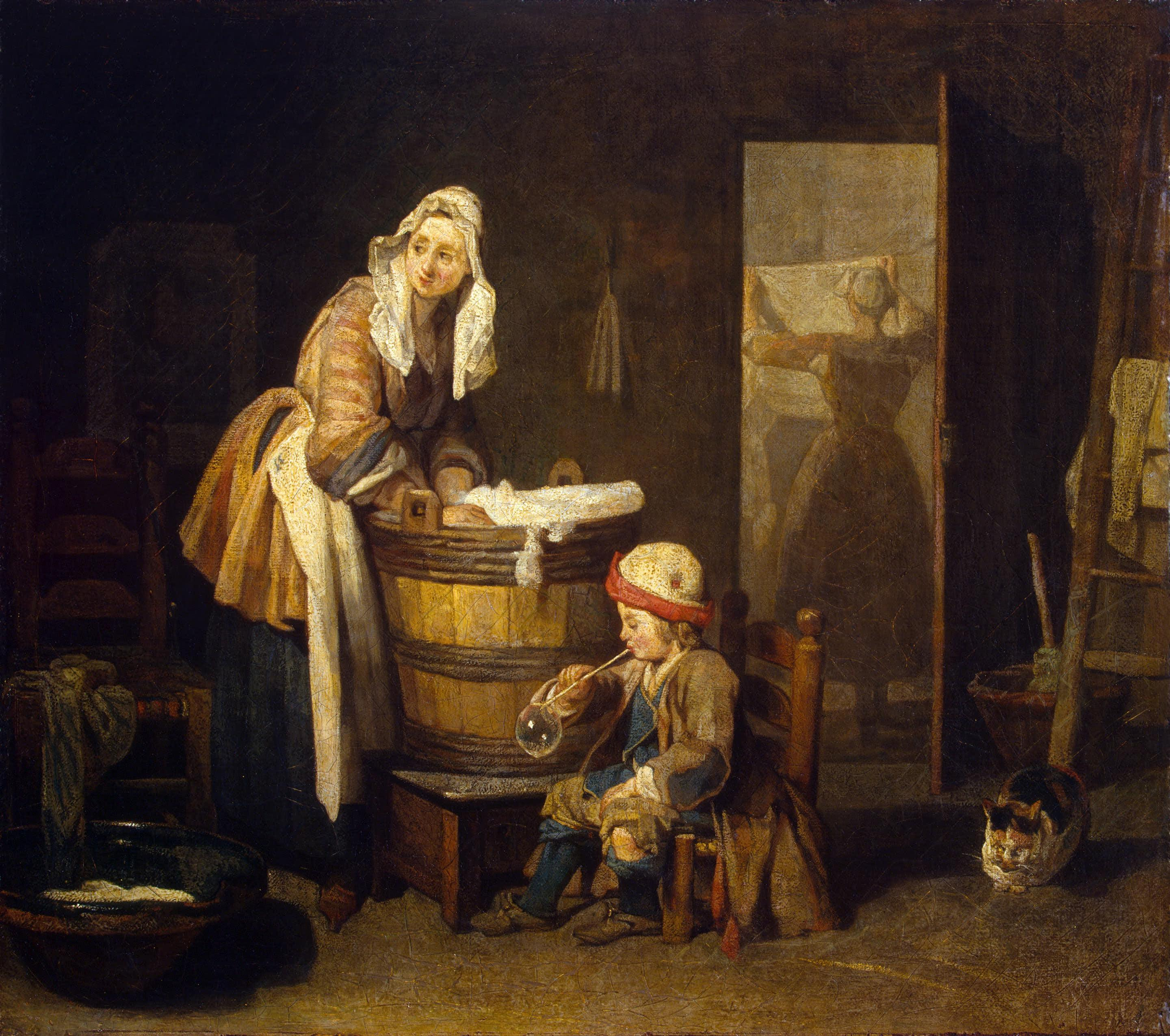
- The Hermitage version
- Artist: Jean Siméon Chardin
- Year: 1733
- Location: Hermitage Museum; Saint Petersburg

The Laundress (French: La Blanchisseuse) or A Young Girl Doing Laundry (Une petite femme s'occupant à savonner) is the title of three oil paintings by the French artist Jean Siméon Chardin. The subject of laundresses, also known as washerwomen, was a popular one in art, especially in France.

== Versions ==
Signed in the top left, the prime version of The Laundress dates to between 1733 and 1740. It formed part of the Crozat collection, which was mostly acquired by Catherine II of Russia on the advice of Denis Diderot in 1772, and so is now in the Hermitage Museum. It measures 38 by 48 cm.

A second version is now in the Nationalmuseum Stockholm; it is smaller (37.5 by 42.5 cm) and is signed in the centre on the stool under the tub. That version was exhibited at the Paris Salon of 1737 and engraved by Cochin in 1739.

A third version (35 by 41 cm) was said to be mentioned in the inventory of Chardin's property compiled on the artist's death in 1779. It was in the Henri de Rothschild collection but was destroyed during the Second World War.

== Bibliography ==
- Crozat, Louis Antoine (1755). Catalogue des tableaux du cabinet de M. Crozat Baron de Thières á Paris (in French). Paris. p. 54 – via the Internet Archive.
- Descargues, Pierre (1961). The Hermitage Museum, Leningrad. New York: Harry N. Abrams. p. 36. OCLC 829900432.
- Lazarev, V. N. (1947). Шарден (in Russian). Moscow: Pushkin Museum Publishers. pp. 30–31.
- Levinson-Lessing, V. F. [in Russian]; et al. (1966). The Hermitage, Leningrad: Baroque & Rococo Masters. London: Paul Hamlyn. note no. 76–77 – via the Internet Archive.
- Nemilova, Inna (June 1975). "Contemporary French Art in Eighteenth-Century Russia". Apollo. 101 (160): 428–442.
- Nemilova, I. S. (1982). Французская живопись XVIII века в Эрмитаже (La peinture française du XVIIIe siècle, Musée de L'Ermitage: catalogue raisonné) [French Painting of the 18th centrty in the Hermitage Museum: Scientific Catalogue]. Leningrad: Iskusstvo. pp. 295–296, cat. no. 364. OCLC 63466759.
- Nemilova, I. S. (1985). A. S. Kantor-Gukovskaya (ed.). Французская живопись. XVIII век [French Painting: the 18th Century]. Государственный Эрмитаж. Собрание западноевропейской живописи: научный каталог в 16 томах (in Russian). Vol. 10. Leningrad: Iskusstvo. pp. 66–67; cat. no. 26. OCLC 22896528.
- Stuffmann, Margret (July–September 1968). "Les tableaux de la collection de Pierre Crozat: historique et destinée d'un ensemble célèbre établis en partant d'un inventaire après décès inédit 30 mai 1740". Gazette des Beaux-Arts (in French). 72: 11–144. OCLC 888303109.
- Yakimovich, A. K. [in Russian] (1981). Шарден и французское Просвещение [Chardin and the French Age of Enlightenment]. Moscow: Iskusstvo. p. 84. OCLC 8430616.
