= Balthazar Nebot =

English painter

Balthazar or Balthasar Nebot, was a painter active in England between 1729 and 1765.

== Life ==
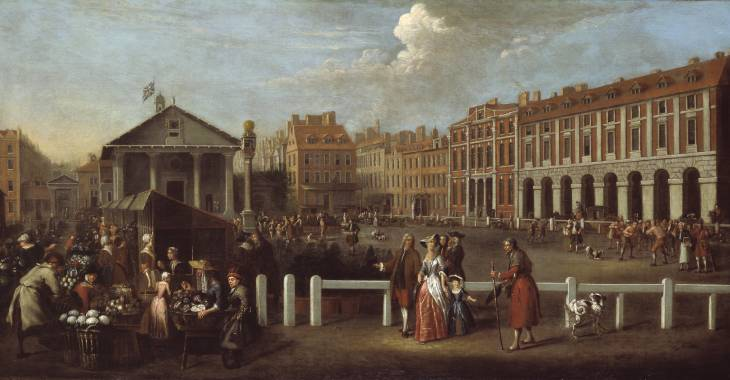
Covent Garden Market and St Paul's by Balthazar Nebot, 1737

Nebot is first recorded in London in 1729–30. He is generally assumed to have been of Spanish birth or descent, but the details of his life are obscure. He married in London in 1729 or 1730, and there are various records of members of his family in the registers of St Paul's, Covent Garden. They include the burials of five of his children between 1731 and 1739, and of his wife Mary in 1742.

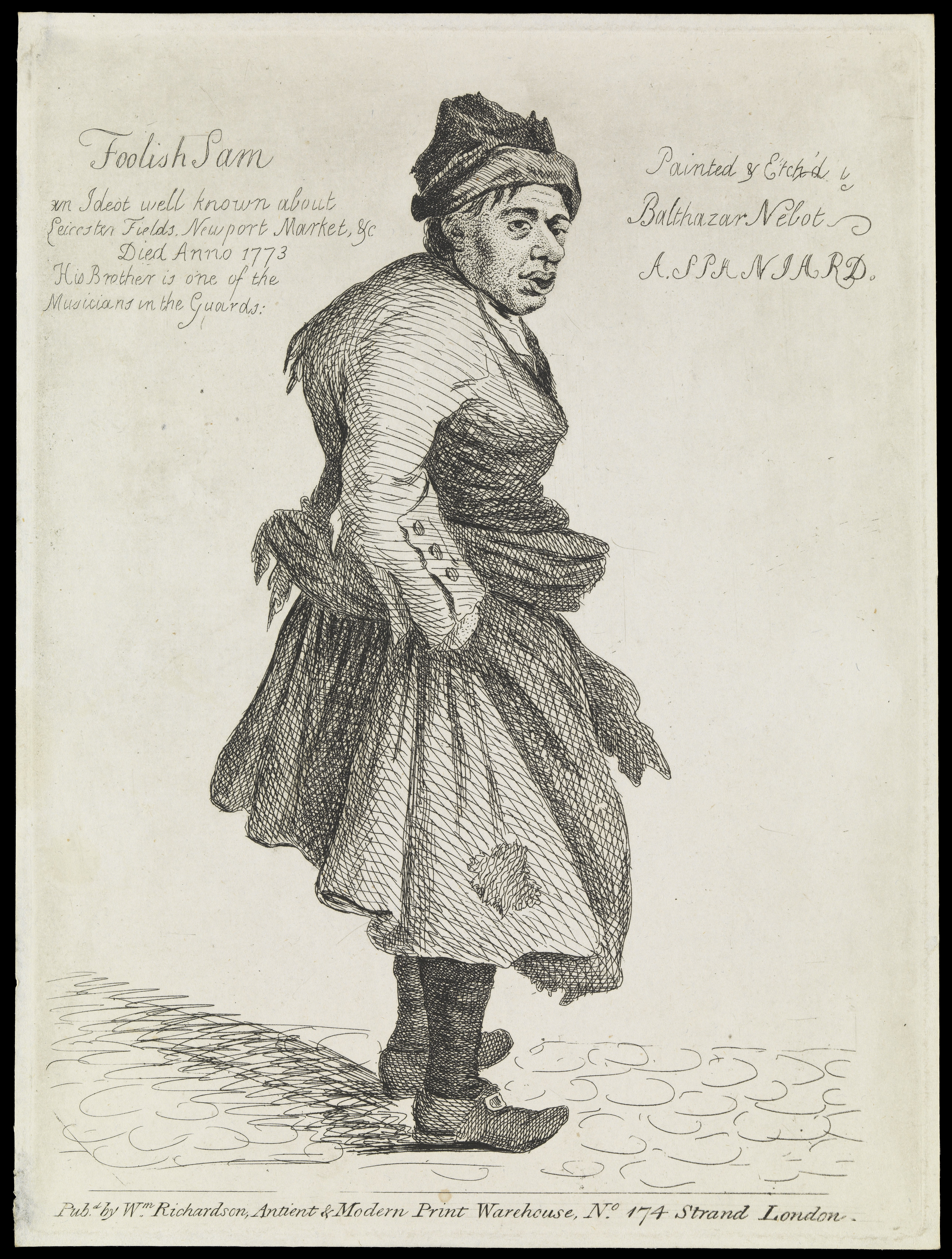
Print of etching of Foolish Sam by Balthazar Nebot

He was a painter of urban scenes and topographical landscapes, whose paintings of markets are considered to be close in style to those of the Dutch painter Peter Angelis who had also worked in Covent Garden. He painted several versions of a picture of the Piazza at Covent Garden, seen from the south-east: one of these, now in the collection of the Tate Gallery is dated 1737. They incorporated genre scenes featuring familiar local characters of the time. Ellis Waterhouse wrote that Nebot's figures "owe something to Hogarth, but are wholly lacking in satirical overtones". Nebot also made an etching of "Foolish Sam", a mentally handicapped man well known in Leicester Fields.

In the 1730s he painted a set of eight scenes recording the new formal gardens at Hartwell House, Buckinghamshire, for Sir Thomas Lee (1687–1749). A unique record of a country estate and garden of the period, they include detailed depictions of the Lee family, their guests and employees. They are now in the collection of the Buckinghamshire County Museum.

In 1741 he painted a portrait of Thomas Coram, the founder of the Foundling Hospital, who is shown coming across an abandoned baby in a basket by the roadside, with the hospital in the background. Engravings after it were made in 1751 and 1817.

He made some anatomical drawings; the University of Glasgow owns some sketches and finished drawings of the female pelvis, as dissected by Robert Nesbitt in 1746. Two of the drawings were engraved by G. Van de Gucht, and all were later acquired by the surgeon William Hunter. Nesbitt was one of the governors of the Foundling Hospital, and is recorded as the owner of Nebot's portrait of Thomas Coram on the engraving of 1751.

He painted fourteen views of Studley Royal and Fountains Abbey in Yorkshire, one of which is dated 1762.

== Sources ==
- Manners and Morals: Hogarth and British Painting 1700–1760. London: Tate Gallery. 1987.
