= St. Peter's Basilica =

Roman Catholic basilica and landmark in Vatican City

- Papal Basilica of Saint Peter in the Vatican
- Basilica di San Pietro (Italian); Basilica Sancti Petri (Latin)
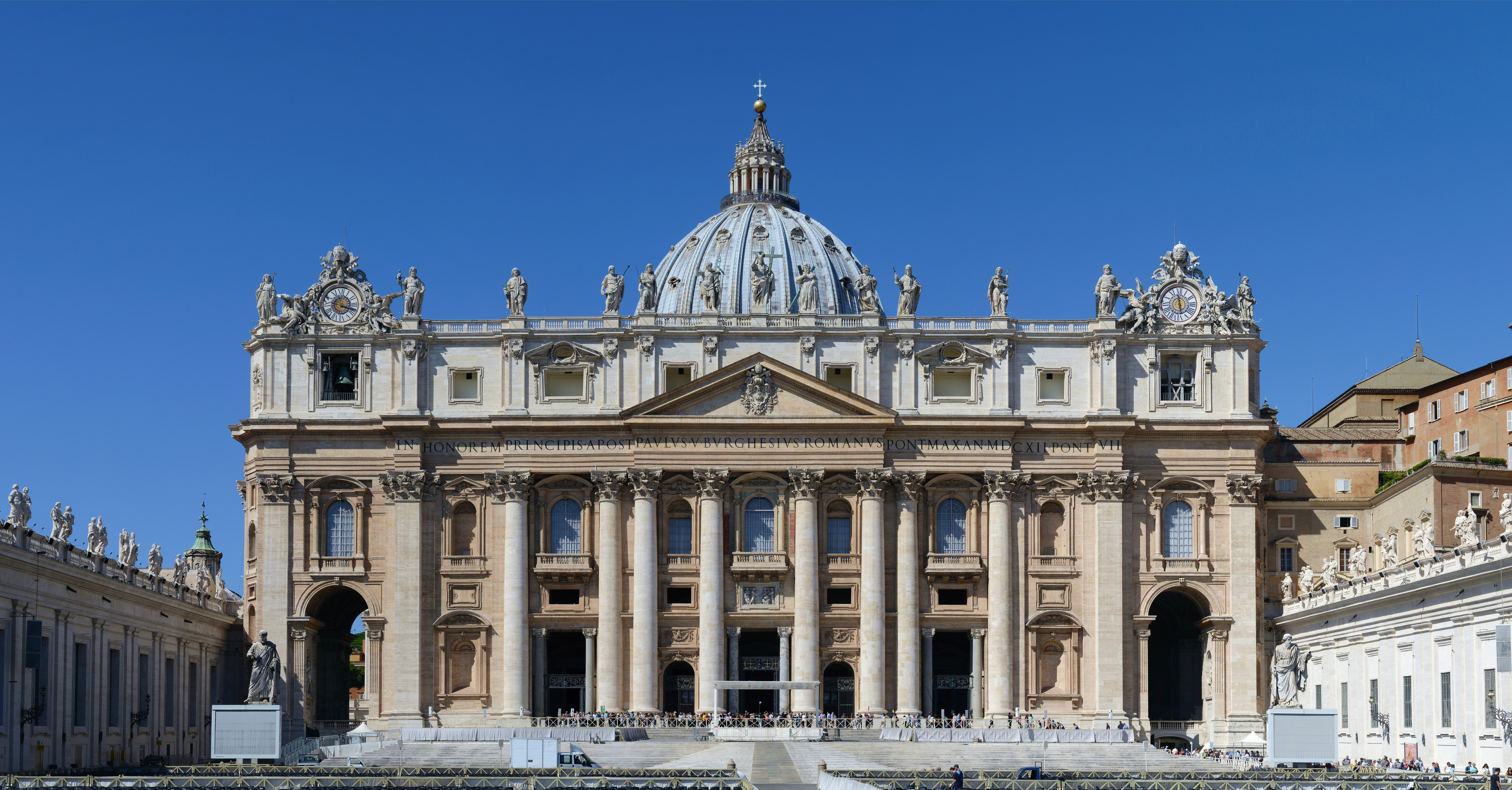
- Main façade and dome of Saint Peter's Basilica, seen from St. Peter's Square
- St. Peter's Basilica
- 41°54′08″N 12°27′12″E
- Country: Vatican City
- Denomination: Catholic
- Sui iuris church: Latin Church
- Tradition: Roman Rite
- Website: St. Peter's Basilica

History
- Status: Papal major basilica
- Dedication: Saint Peter
- Consecrated: 18 November 1626

Architecture
- Architect: Bernardo Rossellino, Giuliano da Sangallo, Donato Bramante, Raphael, Giovanni Giocondo, Antonio da Sangallo the Younger, Baldassare Peruzzi, Michelangelo, Domenico Fontana, Giacomo della Porta, Giacomo Barozzi da Vignola, Pirro Ligorio, Carlo Maderno, Gian Lorenzo Bernini, Francesco Borromini
- Style: Renaissance and Baroque
- Groundbreaking: 18 April 1506
- Completed: 18 November 1626

Specifications
- Capacity: 60,000 standing and 20,000 seated
- Length: 220 metres (720 ft)
- Width: 150 metres (490 ft)
- Height: 136.6 metres (448 ft)

Administration
- Diocese: Rome

Clergy
- Bishop: Pope Leo XIV
- Rector: Archpriest of St. Peter's Basilica; Archbishop Vittorio Francesco Viola

UNESCO World Heritage Site
- Official name: Vatican City
- Type: Cultural
- Criteria: i, ii, iv, vi
- Designated: 1984 (8th session)
- Reference no.: 286
- Region: Europe and North America

The Papal Basilica of Saint Peter in the Vatican (Italian: Basilica Papale di San Pietro in Vaticano), or simply St. Peter's Basilica (Latin: Basilica Sancti Petri; Italian: Basilica di San Pietro [baˈziːlika di sam ˈpjɛːtro]), is a church of the Italian Renaissance located in Vatican City, an independent microstate enclaved within the city of Rome, Italy. It was initially planned in the 15th century by Pope Nicholas V and then Pope Julius II to replace the ageing Old St. Peter's Basilica, which was built in the fourth century by Roman emperor Constantine the Great. Construction of the present basilica began on 18 April 1506 and was completed on 18 November 1626.

Designed principally by Donato Bramante, Michelangelo, and Carlo Maderno, with piazza and fittings by Gian Lorenzo Bernini, Saint Peter's is one of the most renowned works of Italian Renaissance architecture and is the largest church in the world by interior measure. (Note: Claims made that the Basilica of Our Lady of Peace of Yamoussoukro in Côte d'Ivoire is larger appear to be spurious, as the measurements include a rectorate, a villa and probably the forecourt. Its dome, based on that of St. Peter's Basilica, is lower but carries a taller cross, and thus claims to be the tallest domed church.) While it is neither the mother church of the Catholic Church nor the cathedral of the Diocese of Rome (these equivalent titles being held by the Archbasilica of Saint John Lateran in Rome), Saint Peter's is regarded as one of the holiest Catholic shrines. It has been described as "holding a unique position in the Christian world", and as "the greatest of all churches of Christendom".

Catholic tradition holds that the basilica is the burial site of Saint Peter, chief among Jesus's apostles and also the first Bishop of Rome (Pope). Saint Peter's tomb is directly below the high altar of the basilica, also known as the Altar of the Confession. For this reason, many popes, cardinals and bishops have been interred at St. Peter's since the Early Christian period.

St. Peter's is famous as a place of pilgrimage and for its liturgical functions. The pope presides at a number of liturgies throughout the year both within the basilica or the adjoining St. Peter's Square; these liturgies draw audiences numbering from 15,000 to over 80,000 people. St. Peter's has many historical associations, with the early Christian Church, the Papacy, the Protestant Reformation and Catholic Counter-Reformation and numerous artists, especially Michelangelo. As a work of architecture, it is regarded as the greatest building of its age.

St. Peter's is ranked second, after the Archbasilica of Saint John Lateran, among the four churches in the world that hold the rank of major papal basilica, all four of which are in Rome, and is also one of the Seven Pilgrim Churches of Rome. Contrary to popular misconception, it is not a cathedral because it is not the seat of a bishop.

== Overview ==
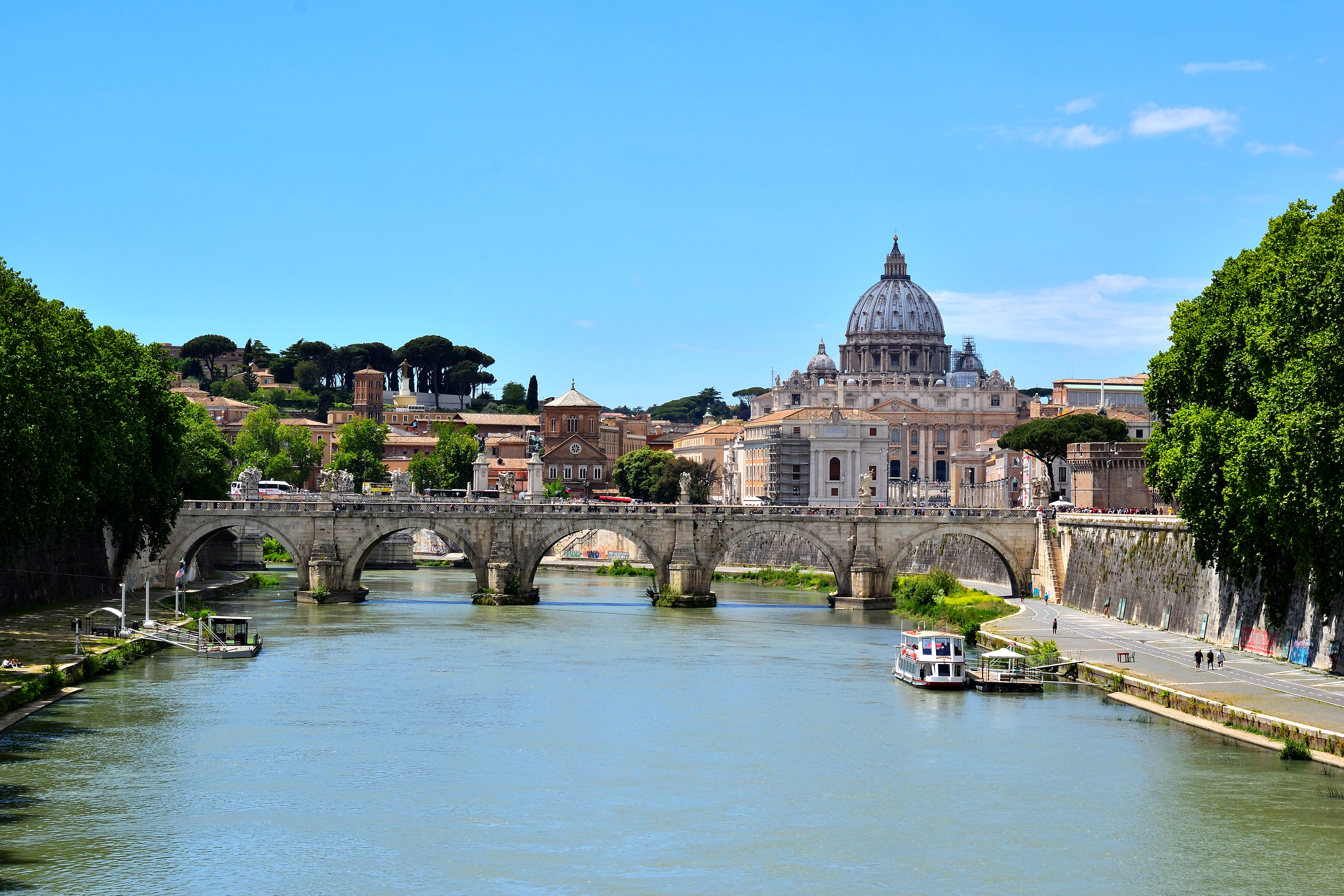
View from the Tiber on Ponte Sant'Angelo and the Basilica. The iconic dome dominates the skyline of Rome.

St. Peter's is a church built in the Renaissance style located in the Vatican City west of the River Tiber and near the Janiculum Hill and Hadrian's Mausoleum. Its central dome dominates the skyline of Rome. The basilica is approached via St. Peter's Square, a forecourt in two sections, both surrounded by tall colonnades. The first space is oval and the second trapezoidal. The façade of the basilica, with a giant order of columns, stretches across the end of the square and is approached by steps on which stand two 5.55-metre (18.2 ft) statues of the first-century apostles to Rome, Saints Peter and Paul.

The basilica is cruciform in shape, with an elongated nave in the Latin cross form but the early designs were for a centrally planned structure and this is still in evidence in the architecture. The central space is dominated both externally and internally by one of the largest domes in the world. Set into the niches of the dome's four gargantuan support piers are colossal statues representing the four major holy relics believed to be held in the basilica: St. Longinus with his spear, St. Helena with the True Cross, St. Veronica with her veil, and St. Andrew, whose skull was possessed by the Vatican until the 20th century. The entrance is through a narthex, or entrance hall, which stretches across the building. One of the decorated bronze doors leading from the narthex is the Holy Door, opened only during jubilees.

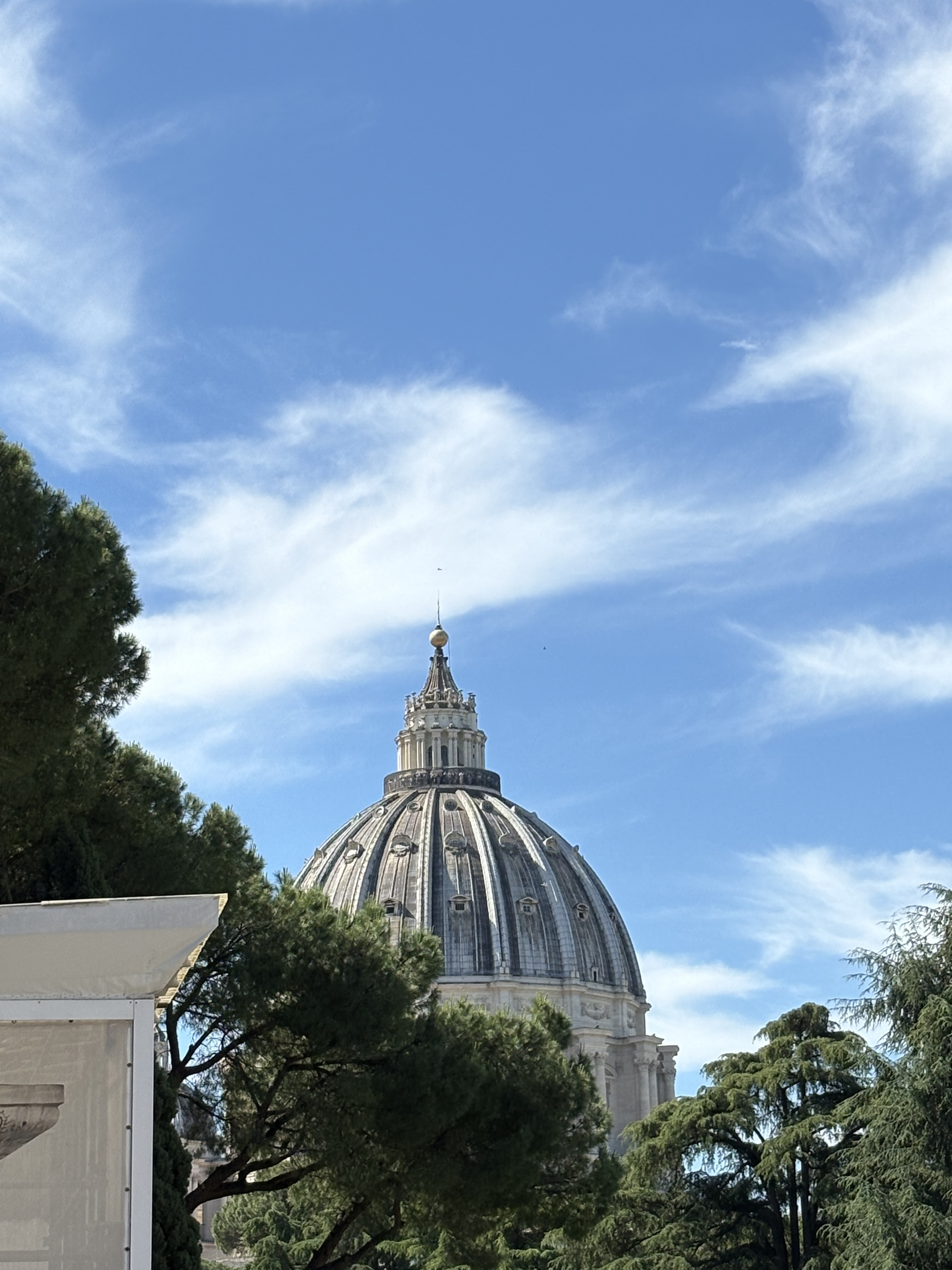
The dome viewed from the Vatican Museum

The interior dimensions are vast when compared to other churches. One author wrote: "Only gradually does it dawn upon us – as we watch people draw near to this or that monument, strangely they appear to shrink; they are, of course, dwarfed by the scale of everything in the building. This in its turn overwhelms us."

The nave which leads to the central dome is in three bays, with piers supporting a barrel vault, the highest of any church. The nave is framed by wide aisles which have a number of chapels off them. There are also chapels surrounding the dome. Moving around the basilica in a clockwise direction they are: The Baptistery, the Chapel of the Presentation of the Virgin, the larger Choir Chapel, the altar of the Transfiguration, the Clementine Chapel with the altar of Saint Gregory, the Sacristy Entrance, the Altar of the Lie, the left transept with altars to the Crucifixion of Saint Peter, Saint Joseph and Saint Thomas, the altar of the Sacred Heart, the Chapel of the Madonna of Column, the altar of Saint Peter and the Paralytic, the apse with the Chair of Saint Peter, the altar of Saint Peter raising Tabitha, the altar of St. Petronilla, the altar of the Archangel Michael, the altar of the Navicella, the right transept with altars of Saint Erasmus, Saints Processo and Martiniano, and Saint Wenceslas, the altar of St. Jerome, the altar of Saint Basil, the Gregorian Chapel with the altar of the Madonna of Succour, the larger Chapel of the Holy Sacrament, the Chapel of Saint Sebastian and the Chapel of the Pietà. The Monuments, in a clockwise direction, are to: Maria Clementina Sobieska, The Stuarts, Benedict XV, John XXIII, St. Pius X, Innocent VIII, Leo XI, Innocent XI, Pius VII, Pius VIII, Alexander VII, Alexander VIII, Paul III, Urban VIII, Clement X, Clement XIII, Benedict XIV, St Peter (Bronze Statue), Gregory XVI, Gregory XIV, Gregory XIII, Matilda of Canossa, Innocent XII, Pius XII, Pius XI, Christina of Sweden, and Leo XII.

At the heart of the basilica, beneath the high altar, is the Confessio or Chapel of the Confession, named in reference to the confession of faith by St. Peter, which led to his martyrdom. Two curving marble staircases lead to this underground chapel at the level of the Constantinian church and immediately above the purported burial place of Saint Peter. Pope Gregory XVI granted a "perpetual privilege" in 1836 authorizing any Catholic priest to celebrate Mass at the altar in the chapel.

The entire interior of St. Peter's is lavishly decorated with marble, reliefs, architectural sculpture and gilding. The basilica contains a large number of tombs of popes and other notable people, many of which are considered outstanding artworks. There are also a number of sculptures in niches and chapels, including Michelangelo's Pietà. The central feature is a baldachin, or canopy over the Papal Altar, designed by Gian Lorenzo Bernini. The apse culminates in a sculptural ensemble, also by Bernini, and containing the symbolic Chair of Saint Peter.

The American philosopher Ralph Waldo Emerson described St. Peter's as "an ornament of the earth ... the sublime of the beautiful."

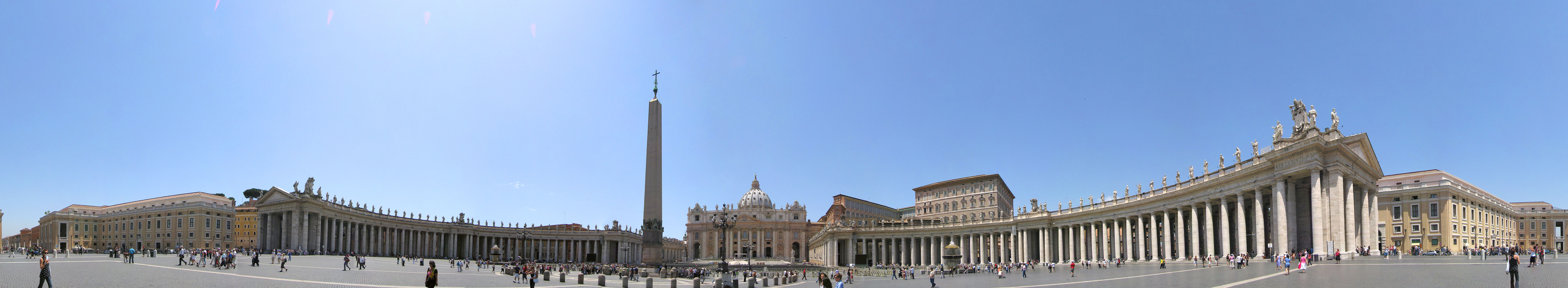
Panorama of St. Peter's Square

== Status ==
St. Peter's Basilica is one of the papal basilicas (previously styled "patriarchal basilicas") (Note: Benedict XVI's theological act of renouncing the title of "Patriarch of the West" had as a consequence that Catholic Roman Rite patriarchal basilicas are today officially known as Papal basilicas.) and one of the four Major Basilicas of Rome the others (all of which are also Papal Basilicas) being the Basilicas of St. John Lateran, St. Mary Major, and St. Paul Outside the Walls. The rank of major basilica confers on St. Peter's Basilica precedence before all minor basilicas worldwide. However, unlike all the other Papal Major Basilicas, it is wholly within the territory, and thus the sovereign jurisdiction, of the Vatican City State, and not that of Italy.

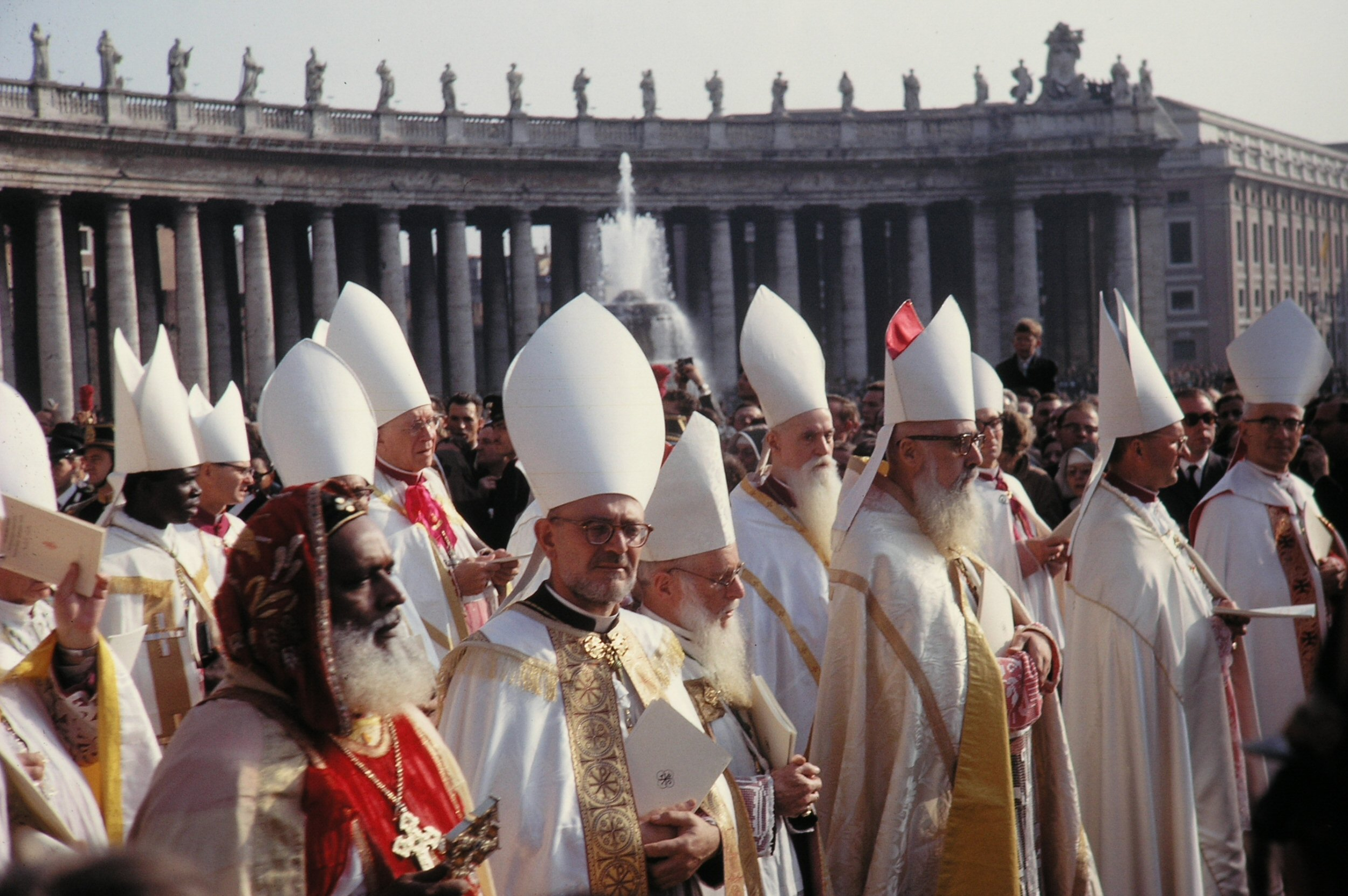
Bishops at the Second Vatican Council in 1962

It is the most prominent building in the Vatican City. Its dome is a feature of the skyline of Rome and covers an area of 0.139 hectares (0.34 acres). One of the holiest sites of Christianity and Catholic Tradition, it is traditionally the burial site of its titular, St. Peter, who was the head of the twelve Apostles of Jesus and, according to tradition, the first Bishop of Antioch and later the first Bishop of Rome, rendering him the first Pope. Although the New Testament does not mention St. Peter's martyrdom in Rome, tradition, based on the writings of the Fathers of the Church, holds that his tomb is below the baldachin and the altar of the Basilica in the "Confession". For this reason, many Popes have, from the early years of the Church, been buried near Pope St. Peter in the necropolis beneath the Basilica. Construction of the current basilica, over the old Constantinian basilica, began on 18 April 1506 and finished in 1615. At length, on 18 November 1626 Pope Urban VIII solemnly dedicated the Basilica.

St. Peter's Basilica is neither the Pope's official seat nor first in rank among the Major Basilicas of Rome. This honour is held by the Pope's cathedral, the Archbasilica of St. John Lateran, the mother church of all churches in communion with the Catholic Church. However, St. Peter's is functionally the Pope's principal church, as most Papal liturgies and ceremonies take place there due to its size, proximity to the Papal residence, and location within the Vatican City proper. The "Chair of Saint Peter", or cathedra, an ancient chair sometimes presumed to have been used by St. Peter himself, but which was a gift from Charles the Bald and used by many popes, symbolizes the continuing line of apostolic succession from St. Peter to the reigning Pope. It occupies an elevated position in the apse of the Basilica, supported symbolically by the Doctors of the Church and enlightened symbolically by the Holy Spirit.

As one of the constituent structures of the historically and architecturally significant Vatican City, St. Peter's Basilica was inscribed as a UNESCO World Heritage Site in 1984 under criteria (i), (ii), (iv), and (vi). With an exterior area of 21,095 square metres (227,060 ft^{2}), an interior area of 15,160 square metres (163,200 ft^{2}), St. Peter's Basilica is the largest Christian church building in the world by the two latter metrics and the second largest by the first as of 2016. The top of its dome, at 448.1 feet (136.6 m), also places it as the second tallest building in Rome as of 2016. The dome's soaring height placed it among the tallest buildings of the Old World, and it continues to hold the title of tallest dome in the world. Though the largest dome in the world by diameter at the time of its completion, it no longer holds this distinction.

== History ==
=== Saint Peter's burial site ===
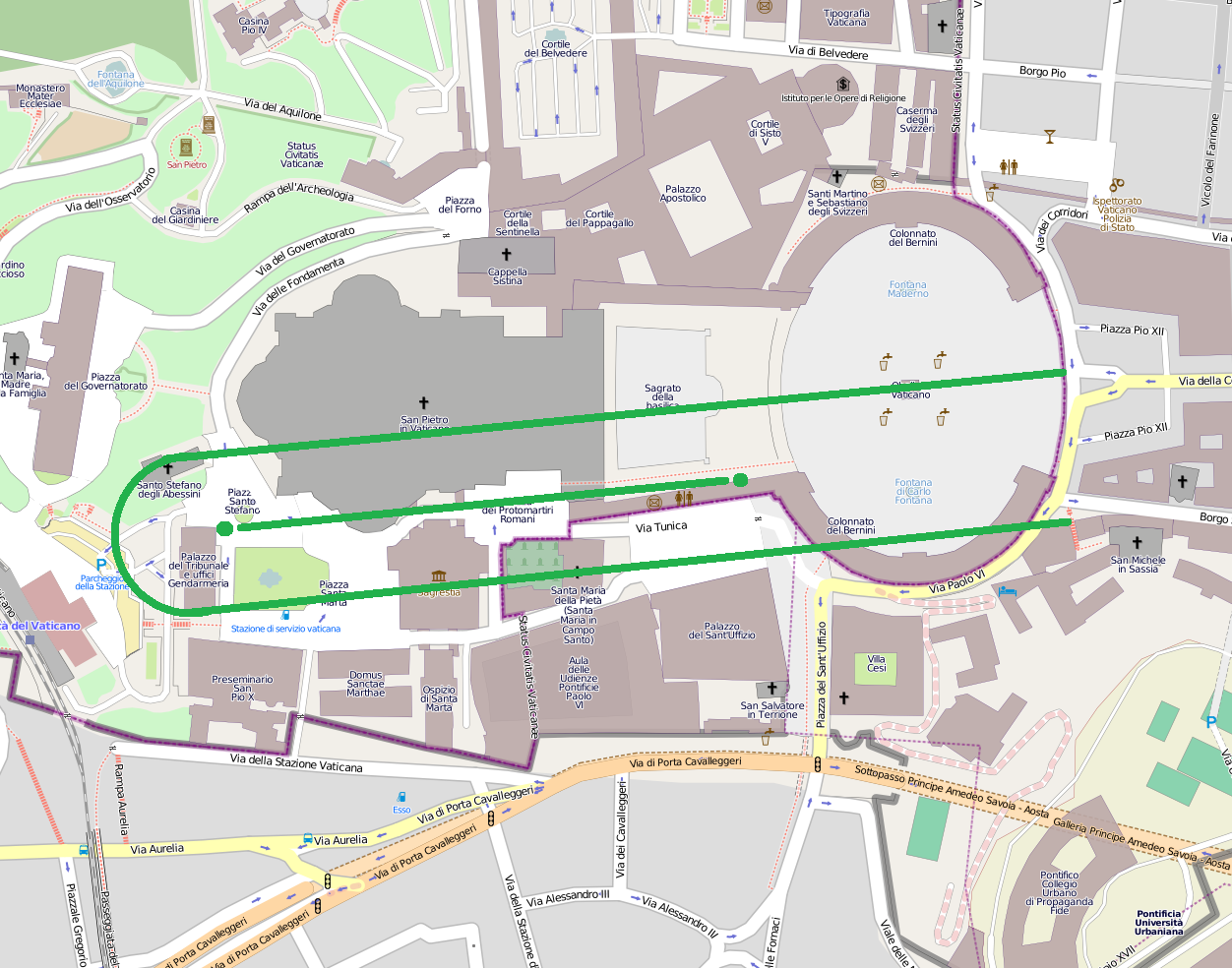
A modern conjectural reconstruction of the relative locations of the circus, and the medieval and current Basilicas of St. Peter

After the crucifixion of Jesus, it is recorded in the Biblical book of the Acts of the Apostles that one of his twelve disciples, Simon known as Saint Peter, a fisherman from Galilee, took a leadership position among Jesus' followers and was of great importance in the founding of the Christian Church. The name Peter is "Petrus" in Latin and "Petros" in Greek, deriving from petra which means "stone" or "rock" in Greek, and is the literal translation of the Aramaic "Kepa", the name given to Simon by Jesus. (John 1:42, and see Matthew 16:18)

Catholic tradition holds that Peter, after a ministry of thirty-four years, travelled to Rome and met his martyrdom there along with Paul on 13 October 64 AD during the reign of the Roman Emperor Nero. His execution was one of the many martyrdoms of Christians following the Great Fire of Rome. According to Jerome, Peter was crucified head downwards, by his own request because he considered himself unworthy to die in the same manner as Jesus. The crucifixion took place near an ancient Egyptian obelisk in the Circus of Nero. The obelisk now stands in St. Peter's Square and is revered as a "witness" to Peter's death. It is one of several ancient Obelisks of Rome.

According to tradition, Peter's remains were buried just outside the Circus, on the Mons Vaticanus across the Via Cornelia from the Circus, less than 150 metres (490 ft) from his place of death. The Via Cornelia was a road which ran east-to-west along the north wall of the Circus on land now covered by the southern portions of the Basilica and St. Peter's Square. A shrine was built on this site some years later. Almost three hundred years later, Old St. Peter's Basilica was constructed over this site.

The area now covered by the Vatican City had been a cemetery for some years before the Circus of Nero was built. It was a burial ground for the numerous executions in the Circus and contained many Christian burials as for many years after the burial of Saint Peter, many Christians chose to be buried near him.

In 1939, in the reign of Pope Pius XII, 10 years of archaeological research began under the crypt of the basilica in an area inaccessible since the ninth century. The excavations revealed the remains of shrines of different periods at different levels, from Clement VIII (1594) to Callixtus II (1123) and Gregory I (590–604), built over an aedicula containing fragments of bones that were folded in a tissue with gold decorations, tinted with the precious murex purple. Although it could not be determined with certainty that the bones were those of Peter, the rare vestments suggested a burial of great importance. On 23 December 1950, in his pre-Christmas radio broadcast to the world, Pope Pius XII announced the discovery of Saint Peter's tomb.

=== Old St. Peter's Basilica ===
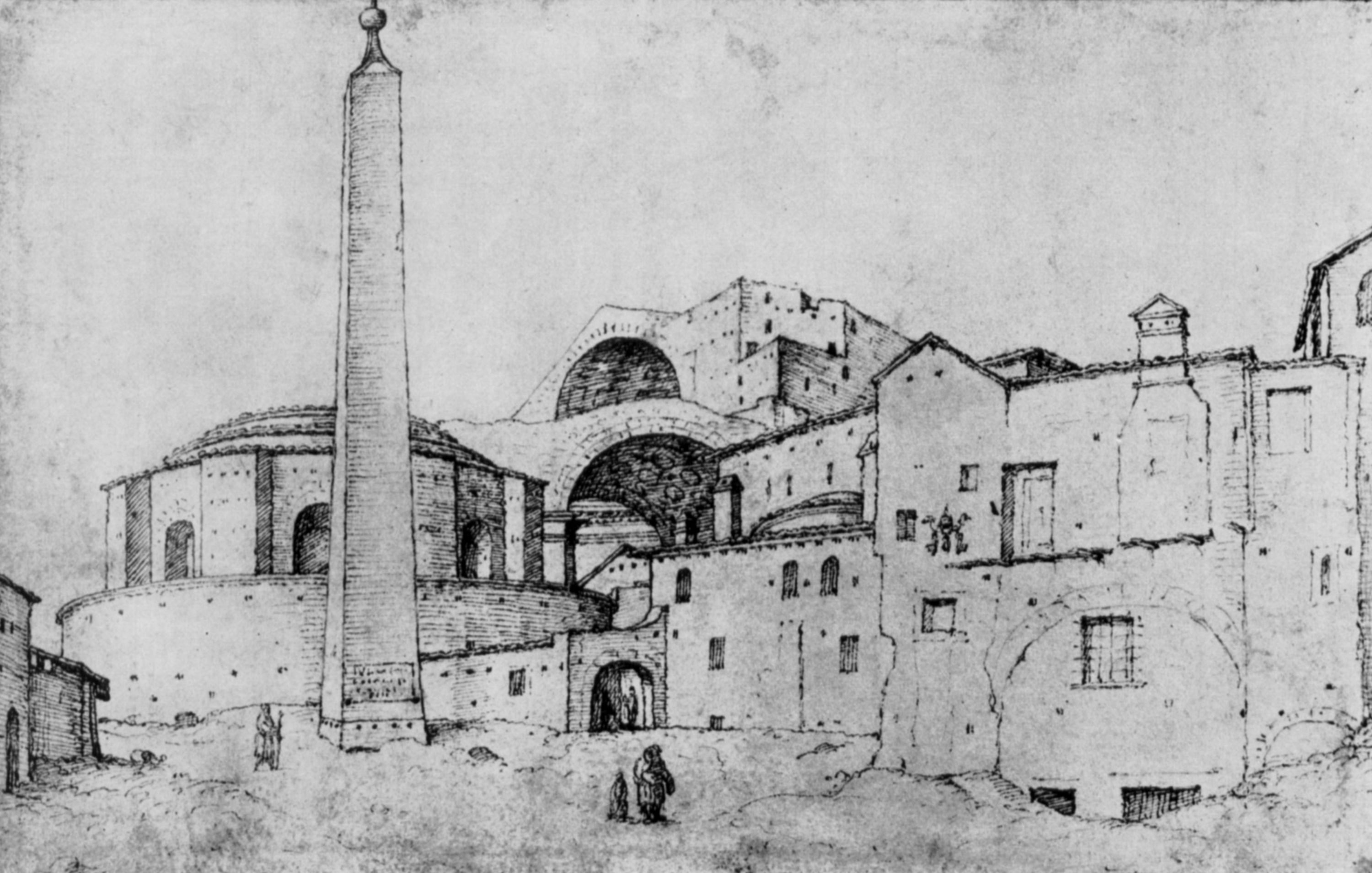
Maarten van Heemskerck – Santa Maria della Febbre, Vatican Obelisk, Saint Peter's Basilica in construction (1532)

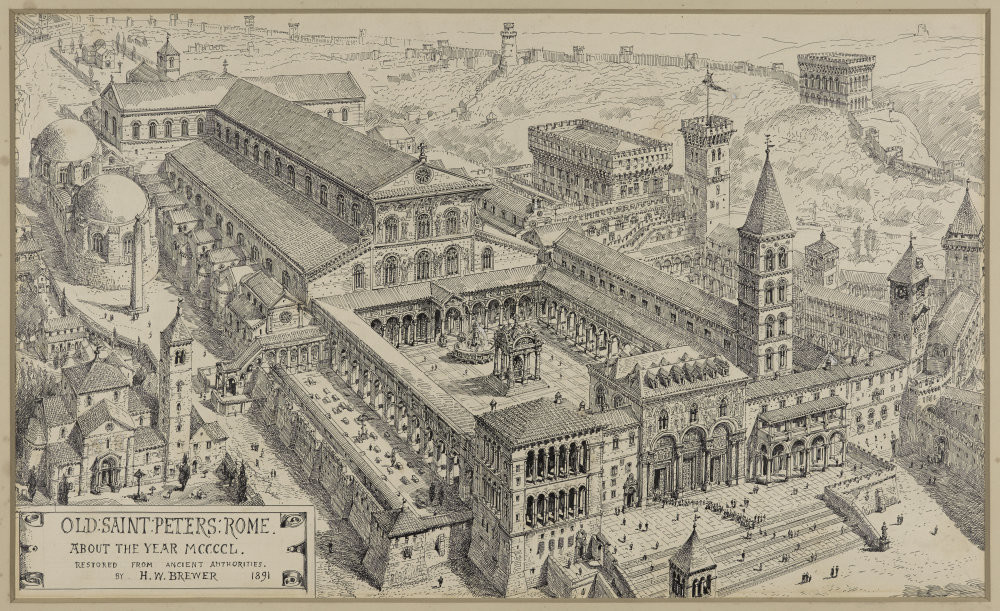
A conjectural view of the Old St. Peter's Basilica by H. W. Brewer, 1891

Old St. Peter's Basilica was the fourth-century church begun by the Emperor Constantine the Great between 319 and 333 AD. It was of typical basilical form, a wide nave and two aisles on each side and an apsidal end, with the addition of a transept or bema, giving the building the shape of a tau cross. It was over 103.6 metres (340 ft) long, and the entrance was preceded by a large colonnaded atrium. This church had been built over the small shrine believed to mark the burial place of St. Peter, though the tomb was "smashed" in 846 AD. It contained a very large number of burials and memorials, including those of most of the popes from St. Peter to the 15th century. Like all of the earliest churches in Rome, both this church and its successor had the entrance to the east and the apse at the west end of the building. Since the construction of the current basilica, the name Old St. Peter's Basilica has been used for its predecessor to distinguish the two buildings.

=== Plan to rebuild ===
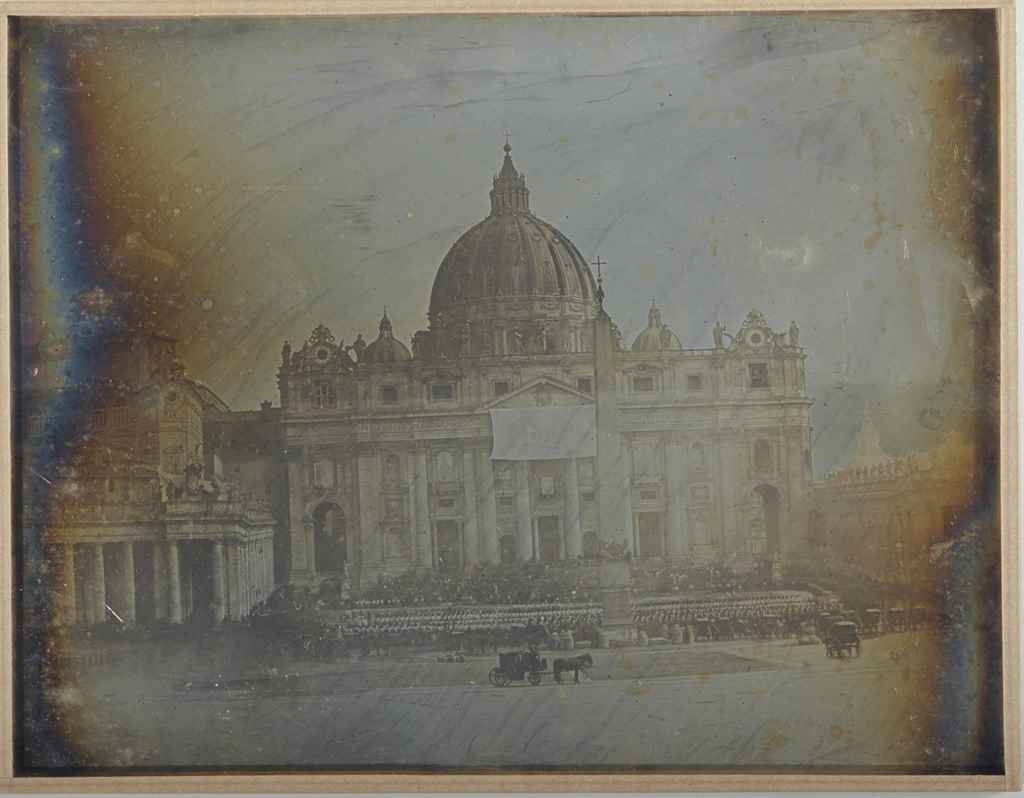
One of the earliest photographs of the Basilica, taken in 1842 during Easter by Joseph-Philibert Girault de Prangey

By the end of the 15th century, having been neglected during the period of the Avignon Papacy, the old basilica had fallen into disrepair. It appears that the first pope to consider rebuilding or at least making radical changes was Pope Nicholas V (1447–1455). He commissioned work on the old building from Leone Battista Alberti and Bernardo Rossellino and also had Rossellino design a plan for an entirely new basilica, or an extreme modification of the old. His reign was frustrated by political problems and when he died, little had been achieved. He had, however, ordered the demolition of the Colosseum and by the time of his death, 2,522 cartloads of stone had been transported for use in the new building. (Note: Quarrying of stone for the Colosseum had, in turn, been paid for with treasure looted at the Siege of Jerusalem and destruction of the temple by the emperor Vespasian's general (and the future emperor) Titus in 70 AD.) The foundations were completed for a new transept and choir to form a domed Latin cross with the preserved nave and side aisles of the old basilica. Some walls for the choir had also been built.

Pope Julius II planned far more for St Peter's than Nicholas V's program of repair or modification. Julius was at that time planning his own tomb, which was to be designed and adorned with sculpture by Michelangelo and placed within St Peter's. (Note: Julius II's tomb was left incomplete and was eventually erected in the Church of St Peter ad Vincola.) In 1505 Julius made a decision to demolish the ancient basilica and replace it with a monumental structure to house his enormous tomb and "aggrandize himself in the popular imagination". A competition was held, and a number of the designs have survived at the Uffizi Gallery. A succession of popes and architects followed in the next 120 years, their combined efforts resulting in the present building. The scheme begun by Julius II continued through the reigns of Leo X (1513–1521), Adrian VI (1522–1523), Clement VII (1523–1534), Paul III (1534–1549), Julius III (1550–1555), Marcellus II (1555), Paul IV (1555–1559), Pius IV (1559–1565), Pius V (saint) (1565–1572), Gregory XIII (1572–1585), Sixtus V (1585–1590), Urban VII (1590), Gregory XIV (1590–1591), Innocent IX (1591), Clement VIII (1592–1605), Leo XI (1605), Paul V (1605–1621), Gregory XV (1621–1623), Urban VIII (1623–1644) and Innocent X (1644–1655).

=== Financing with indulgences ===
One method employed to finance the building of St. Peter's Basilica was the granting of indulgences in return for contributions. A major promoter of this method of fund-raising was Albrecht, Archbishop of Mainz and Magdeburg, who had to clear debts owed to the Roman Curia by contributing to the rebuilding program. To facilitate this, he appointed the German Dominican preacher Johann Tetzel, whose salesmanship provoked a scandal and led to the Protestant Reformation.

=== Digital copies ===
In the 2020s, the Vatican began seeking to use digital recreations of the Basilica in order to enhance education and allow people to experience it without needing to visit in person. In 2024, the Vatican partnered with Microsoft to create an interactive 3D model of the Basilica. The model was generated with artificial intelligence using over 400,000 high-resolution photographs taken by drones. Microsoft president Brad Smith described the project as "one of the most technologically advanced and sophisticated projects of its kind that has ever been pursued". The Vatican further collaborated with Microsoft in 2025 through the creation of another interactive version of the Basilica, this time recreated in the video game Minecraft. The Minecraft map, titled "Peter is Here", was developed as part of the 2025 Jubilee with the goal of engaging young audiences.

== Architecture ==
=== Successive plans ===
Pope Julius's scheme for the grandest building in Christendom was the subject of a competition for which a number of entries remain intact in the Uffizi Gallery, Florence. It was the design of Donato Bramante that was selected, and for which the foundation stone was laid in 1506. This plan was in the form of an enormous Greek cross with a dome inspired by that of the huge circular Roman temple, the Pantheon. The main difference between Bramante's design and that of the Pantheon is that where the dome of the Pantheon is supported by a continuous wall, that of the new basilica was to be supported only on four large piers. This feature was maintained in the ultimate design. Bramante's dome was to be surmounted by a lantern with its own small dome but otherwise very similar in form to the Early Renaissance lantern of Florence Cathedral designed for Brunelleschi's dome by Michelozzo.

Bramante had envisioned that the central dome would be surrounded by four lower domes at the diagonal axes. The equal chancel, nave and transept arms were each to be of two bays ending in an apse. At each corner of the building was to stand a tower, so that the overall plan was square, with the apses projecting at the cardinal points. Each apse had two large radial buttresses, which squared off its semi-circular shape.

When Pope Julius died in 1513, Bramante was replaced with Giuliano da Sangallo and Fra Giocondo, who both died in 1515 (Bramante himself having died the previous year). Raphael was confirmed as the architect of St. Peter's on 1 August 1514. The main change in his plan is the nave of five bays, with a row of complex apsidal chapels off the aisles on either side. Raphael's plan for the chancel and transepts made the squareness of the exterior walls more definite by reducing the size of the towers, and the semi-circular apses more clearly defined by encircling each with an ambulatory.

In 1520 Raphael also died, aged 37, and his successor Baldassare Peruzzi maintained changes that Raphael had proposed to the internal arrangement of the three main apses, but otherwise reverted to the Greek cross plan and other features of Bramante. This plan did not go ahead because of various difficulties of both Church and state. In 1527 Rome was sacked and plundered by Emperor Charles V. Peruzzi died in 1536 without his plan being realized.

At this point Antonio da Sangallo the Younger submitted a plan which combines features of Peruzzi, Raphael and Bramante in its design and extends the building into a short nave with a wide façade and portico of dynamic projection. His proposal for the dome was much more elaborate in both structure and decoration than that of Bramante and included ribs on the exterior. Like Bramante, Sangallo proposed that the dome be surmounted by a lantern which he redesigned to a larger and much more elaborate form. Sangallo's main practical contribution was to strengthen Bramante's piers, which had begun to crack.

On 1 January 1547, in the reign of Pope Paul III, Michelangelo, then in his seventies, succeeded Sangallo the Younger as "Capomaestro", the superintendent of the building program at St Peter's. He is to be regarded as the principal designer of a large part of the building as it stands today, and as having brought the construction to a point where it could be carried through. He did not take on the job with pleasure; it was forced upon him by Pope Paul, frustrated at the death of his chosen candidate, Giulio Romano and the refusal of Jacopo Sansovino to leave Venice. Michelangelo wrote, "I undertake this only for the love of God and in honour of the Apostle". He insisted that he should be given a free hand to achieve the ultimate aim by whatever means he saw fit.

Bramante's plan

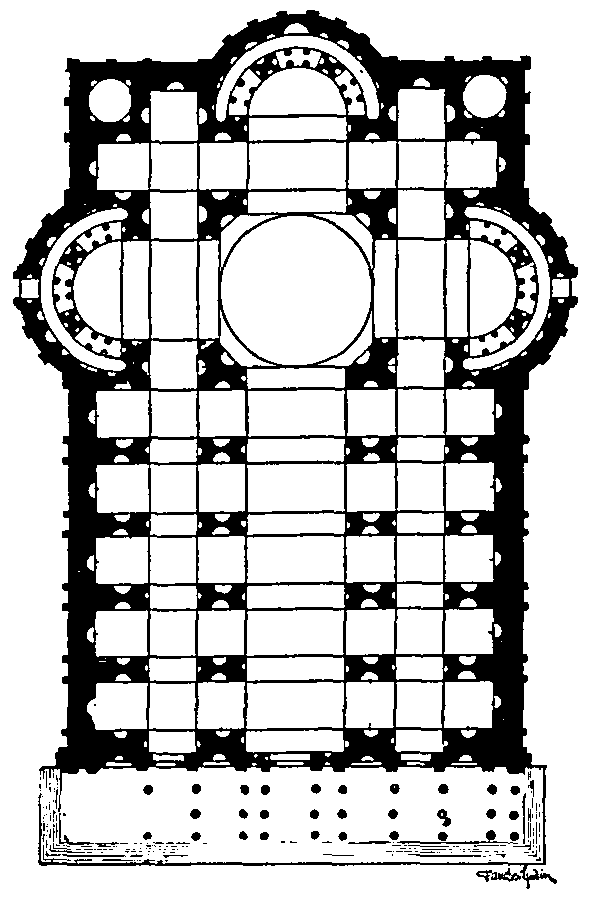
Raphael's plan

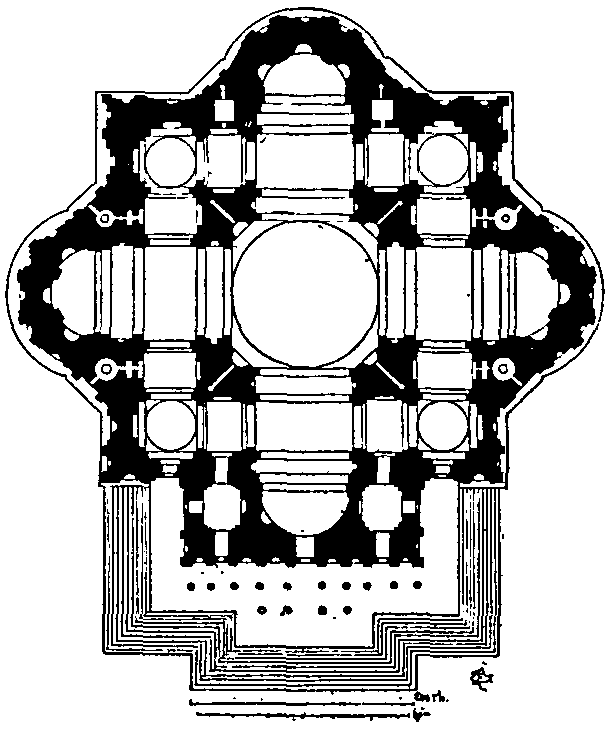
Michelangelo's plan

=== Michelangelo's contribution ===
Michelangelo took over a building site at which four piers, enormous beyond any constructed since ancient Roman times, were rising behind the remaining nave of the old basilica. He also inherited the numerous schemes designed and redesigned by some of the greatest architectural and engineering minds of the 16th century. There were certain common elements in these schemes. They all called for a dome to equal that engineered by Brunelleschi a century earlier and which has since dominated the skyline of Renaissance Florence, and they all called for a strongly symmetrical plan of either Greek Cross form, like the iconic St. Mark's Basilica in Venice, or of a Latin Cross with the transepts of identical form to the chancel, as at Florence Cathedral.

Even though the work had progressed only a little in 40 years, Michelangelo did not simply dismiss the ideas of the previous architects. He drew on them in developing a grand vision. Above all, Michelangelo recognized the essential quality of Bramante's original design. He reverted to the Greek Cross and, as Helen Gardner expresses it: "Without destroying the centralising features of Bramante's plan, Michelangelo, with a few strokes of the pen converted its snowflake complexity into massive, cohesive unity."

As it stands today, St. Peter's has been extended with a nave by Carlo Maderno. It is the chancel end (the ecclesiastical "Eastern end") with its huge centrally placed dome that is the work of Michelangelo. Because of its location within the Vatican State and because the projection of the nave screens the dome from sight when the building is approached from the square in front of it, the work of Michelangelo is best appreciated from a distance. What becomes apparent is that the architect has greatly reduced the clearly defined geometric forms of Bramante's plan of a square with square projections, and also of Raphael's plan of a square with semi-circular projections. Michelangelo has blurred the definition of the geometry by making the external masonry of massive proportions and filling in every corner with a small vestry or stairwell. The effect created is of a continuous wall surface that is folded or fractured at different angles, but lacks the right angles which usually define change of direction at the corners of a building. This exterior is surrounded by a giant order of Corinthian pilasters all set at slightly different angles to each other, in keeping with the ever-changing angles of the wall's surface. Above them, the huge cornice ripples in a continuous band, giving the appearance of keeping the whole building in a state of compression.

=== Dome: successive and final designs ===
The dome of St. Peter's rises to a total height of 136.57 metres (448.1 ft) from the floor of the basilica to the top of the external cross. It is the tallest dome in the world. (Note: This claim has recently been made for Yamoussoukro Basilica, the dome of which, modelled on St. Peter's, is lower but has a taller cross.) Its internal diameter is 41.47 metres (136.1 ft), slightly smaller than two of the three other huge domes that preceded it, those of the Pantheon of Ancient Rome, 43.3 metres (142 ft), and Florence Cathedral of the Early Renaissance, 44 metres (144 ft). It has a greater diameter by approximately 30 feet (9.1 m) than Constantinople's Hagia Sophia church, completed in 537. It was to the domes of the Pantheon and Florence duomo that the architects of St. Peter's looked for solutions as to how to go about building what was conceived, from the outset, as the greatest dome of Christendom.

==== Bramante and Sangallo, 1506 and 1513 ====
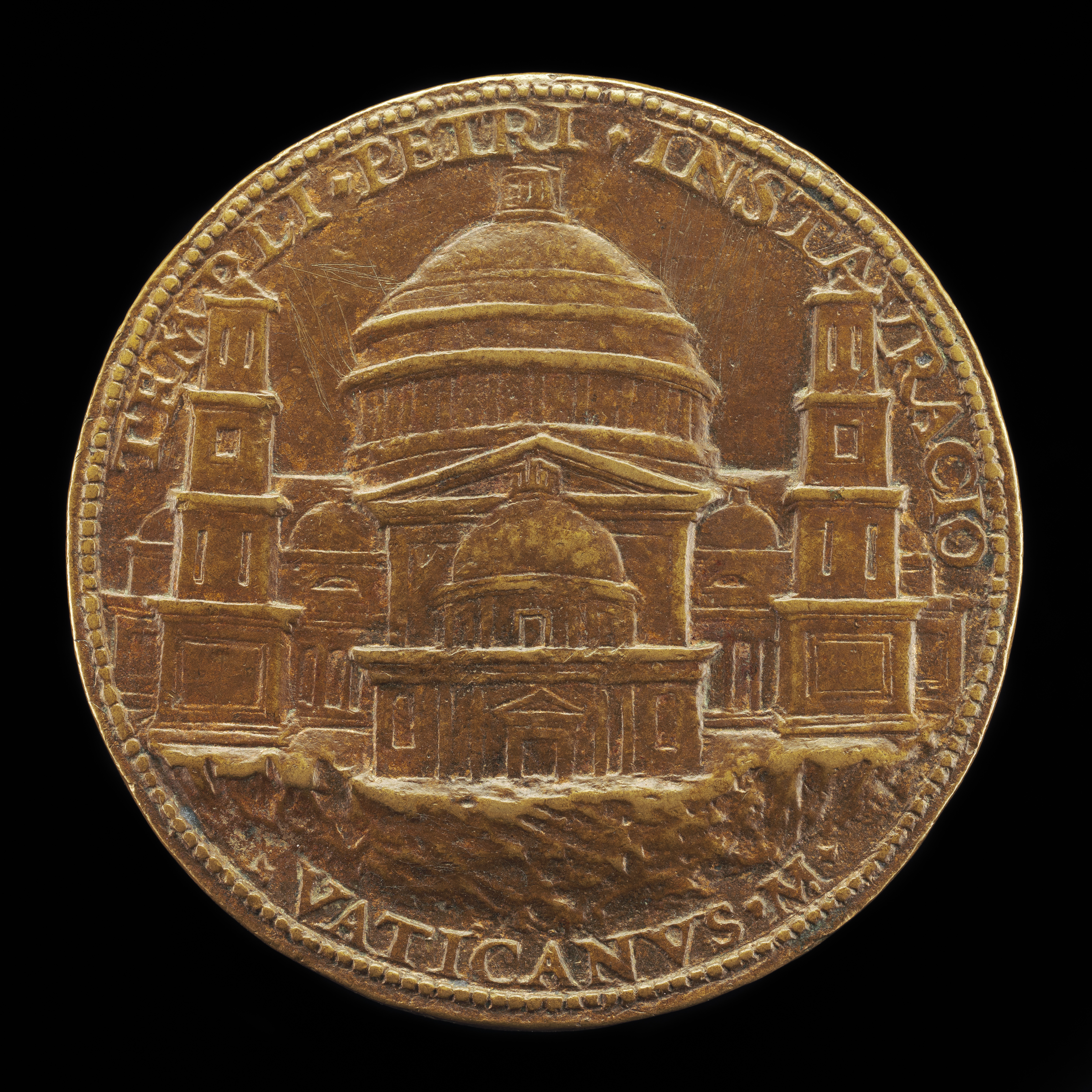
1506 medal by Cristoforo Foppa depicting Bramante's design, including two of the four flanking smaller domes

The dome of the Pantheon stands on a circular wall with no entrances or windows except a single door. The whole building is as high as it is wide. Its dome is constructed in a single shell of concrete, made light by the inclusion of a large amount of the volcanic stones tuff and pumice. The inner surface of the dome is deeply coffered which has the effect of creating both vertical and horizontal ribs while lightening the overall load. At the summit is an ocular opening 8 metres (26 ft) across which provides light to the interior.

Bramante's plan for the dome of St. Peter's (1506) follows that of the Pantheon very closely, and like that of the Pantheon, was designed to be constructed in Tufa Concrete for which he had rediscovered a formula. With the exception of the lantern that surmounts it, the profile is very similar, except that in this case, the supporting wall becomes a drum raised high above ground level on four massive piers. The solid wall, as used at the Pantheon, is lightened at St. Peter's by Bramante piercing it with windows and encircling it with a peristyle.

In the case of Florence Cathedral, the desired visual appearance of the pointed dome existed for many years before Brunelleschi made its construction feasible. (Note: The dome of Florence Cathedral is depicted in a fresco at Santa Maria Novella that pre-dates its building by about 100 years.) Its double-shell construction of bricks locked together in a herringbone pattern (re-introduced from Byzantine architecture), and the gentle upward slope of its eight stone ribs made it possible for the construction to take place without the massive wooden formwork necessary to construct hemispherical arches. While its appearance, with the exception of the details of the lantern, is entirely Gothic, its engineering was highly innovative, and the product of a mind that had studied the huge vaults and remaining dome of Ancient Rome.

Sangallo's plan (1513), of which a large wooden model still exists, looks to both these predecessors. He realized the value of both the coffering at the Pantheon and the outer stone ribs at Florence Cathedral. He strengthened and extended the peristyle of Bramante into a series of arched and ordered openings around the base, with a second such arcade set back in a tier above the first. In his hands, the rather delicate form of the lantern, based closely on that in Florence, became a massive structure, surrounded by a projecting base, a peristyle and surmounted by a spire of conic form. According to James Lees-Milne the design was "too eclectic, too pernickety and too tasteless to have been a success".

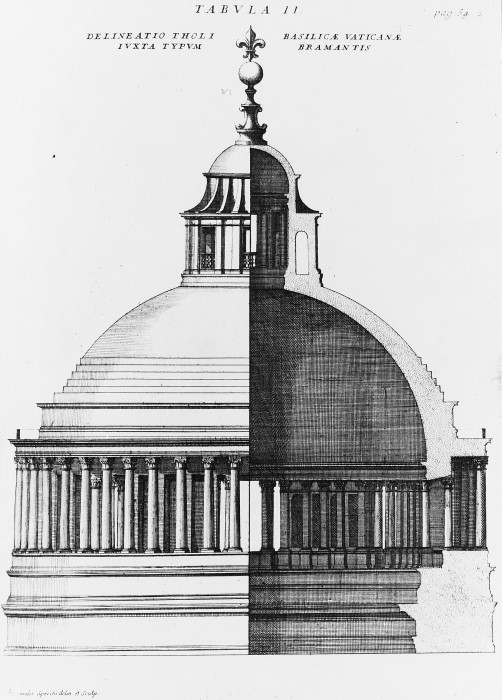
Bramante's dome

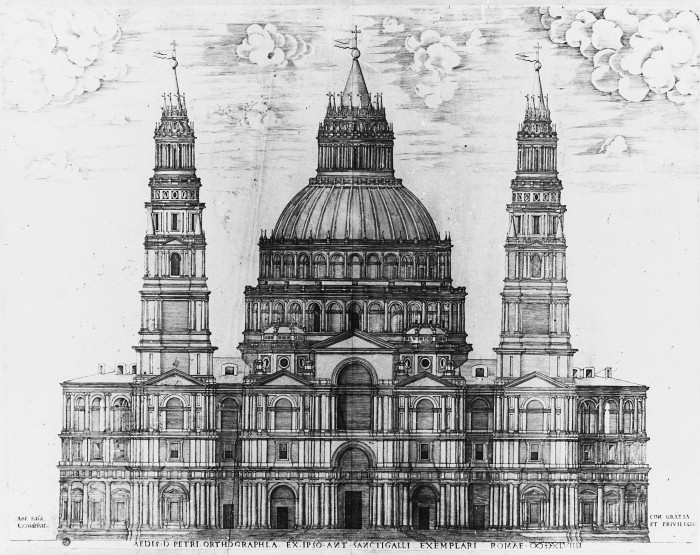
Sangallo's design

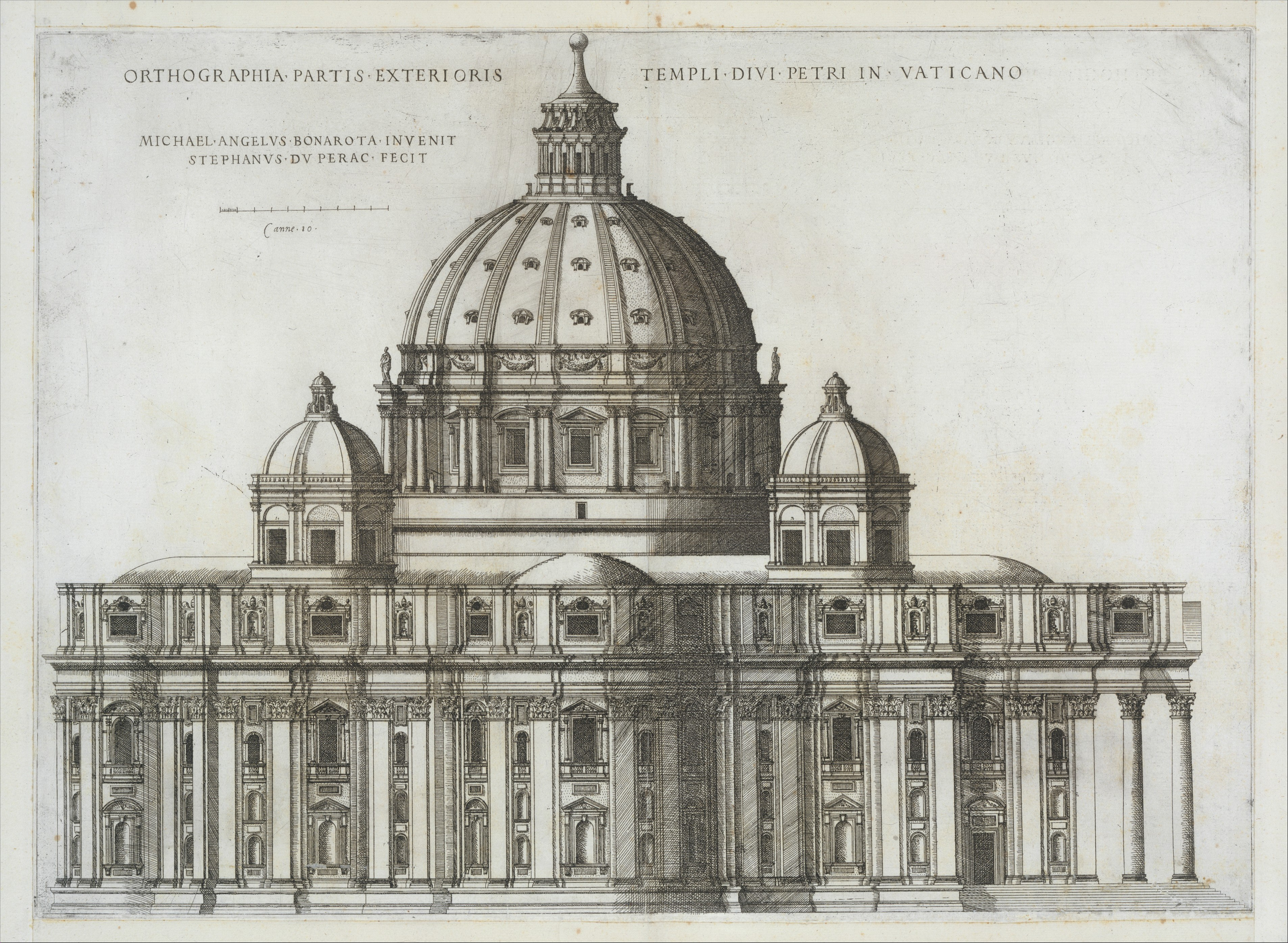
The engraving by Stefan du Pérac was published in 1569, five years after the death of Michelangelo.

==== Michelangelo and Giacomo della Porta, 1547 and 1585 ====
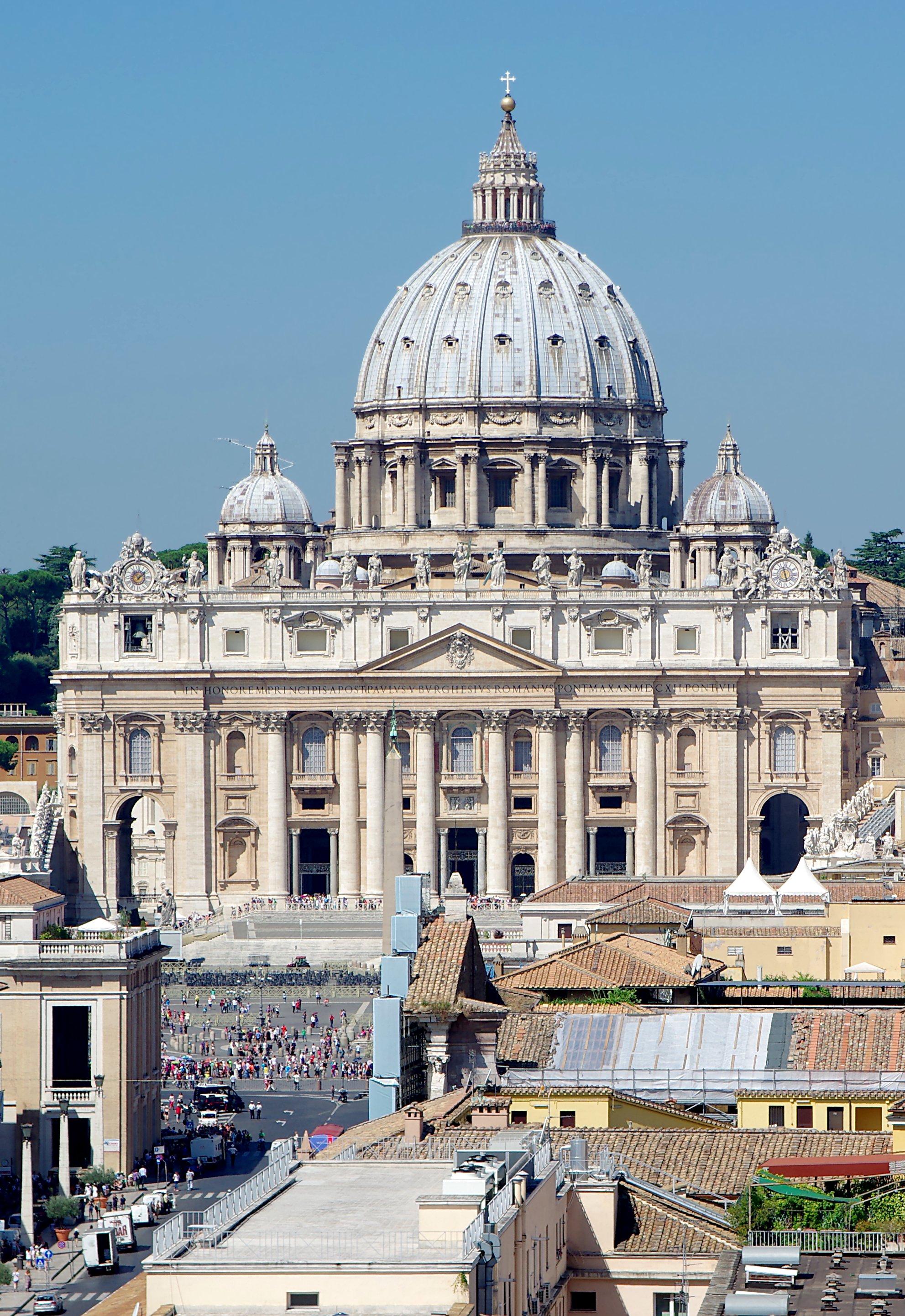
St. Peter's Basilica from Castel Sant'Angelo showing the dome rising behind Maderno's façade

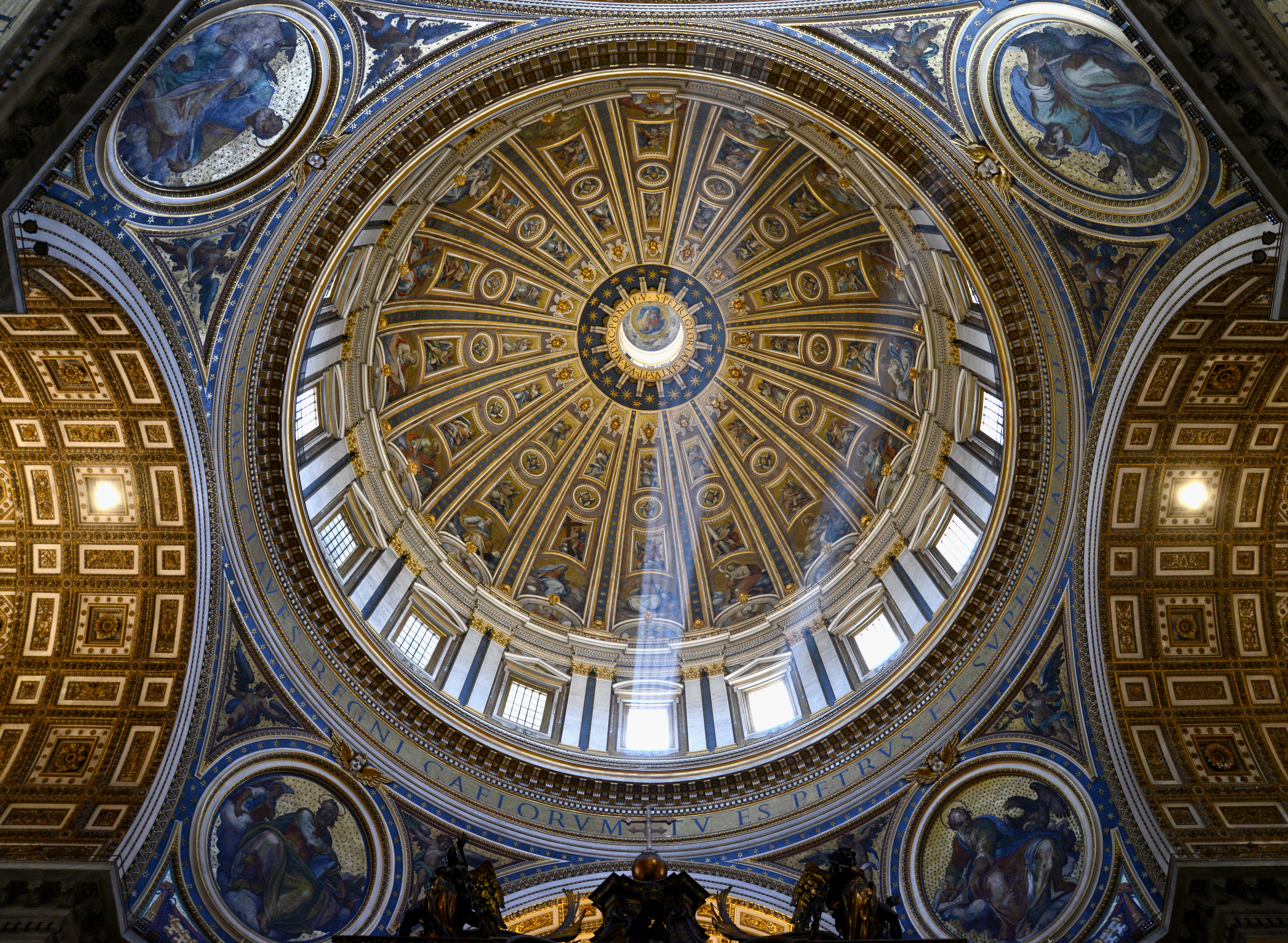
The dome was brought to completion by Giacomo della Porta and Fontana.

Michelangelo redesigned the dome in 1547, taking into account all that had gone before. His dome, like that of Florence, is constructed of two shells of brick, the outer one having 16 stone ribs, twice the number at Florence but far fewer than in Sangallo's design. As with the designs of Bramante and Sangallo, the dome is raised from the piers on a drum. The encircling peristyle of Bramante and the arcade of Sangallo are reduced to 16 pairs of Corinthian columns, each of 15 metres (49 ft) high which stand proud of the building, connected by an arch. Visually they appear to buttress each of the ribs, but structurally they are probably quite redundant. The reason for this is that the dome is ovoid in shape, rising steeply as does the dome of Florence Cathedral, and therefore exerting less outward thrust than does a hemispherical dome, such as that of the Pantheon, which, although it is not buttressed, is countered by the downward thrust of heavy masonry which extends above the circling wall.

The ovoid profile of the dome has been the subject of much speculation and scholarship over the past century. Michelangelo died in 1564, leaving the drum of the dome complete, and Bramante's piers much bulkier than originally designed, each 18 metres (59 ft) across. Following his death, the work continued under his assistant Jacopo Barozzi da Vignola with Giorgio Vasari appointed by Pope Pius V as a watchdog to make sure that Michelangelo's plans were carried out exactly. Despite Vignola's knowledge of Michelangelo's intentions, little happened in this period. In 1585 the energetic Pope Sixtus V appointed Giacomo della Porta who was to be assisted by Domenico Fontana. The five-year reign of Sixtus was to see the building advance at a great rate.

Michelangelo left a few drawings, including an early drawing of the dome, and some details. There were also detailed engravings published in 1569 by Stefan du Pérac who claimed that they were the master's final solution. Michelangelo, like Sangallo before him, also left a large wooden model. Giacomo della Porta subsequently altered this model in several ways. The major change restored an earlier design, in which the outer dome appears to rise above, rather than rest directly on the base. Most of the other changes were of a cosmetic nature, such as the adding of lion's masks over the swags on the drum in honour of Pope Sixtus and adding a circlet of finials around the spire at the top of the lantern, as proposed by Sangallo.

A drawing by Michelangelo indicates that his early intentions were towards an ovoid dome, rather than a hemispherical one. In an engraving in Galasso Alghisi' treatise (1563), the dome may be represented as ovoid, but the perspective is ambiguous. Stefan du Pérac's engraving (1569) shows a hemispherical dome, but this was perhaps an inaccuracy of the engraver. The profile of the wooden model is more ovoid than that of the engravings, but less so than the finished product. It has been suggested that Michelangelo on his death bed reverted to the more pointed shape. However, Lees-Milne cites Giacomo della Porta as taking full responsibility for the change and as indicating to Pope Sixtus that Michelangelo was lacking in the scientific understanding of which he himself was capable.

Helen Gardner suggests that Michelangelo made the change to the hemispherical dome of lower profile in order to establish a balance between the dynamic vertical elements of the encircling giant order of pilasters and a more static and reposeful dome. Gardner also comments, "The sculpturing of architecture [by Michelangelo] ... here extends itself up from the ground through the attic stories and moves on into the drum and dome, the whole building being pulled together into a unity from base to summit."

It is this sense of the building being sculptured, unified and "pulled together" by the encircling band of the deep cornice that led Eneide Mignacca to conclude that the ovoid profile, seen now in the end product, was an essential part of Michelangelo's first (and last) concept. The sculptor/architect has, figuratively speaking, taken all the previous designs in hand and compressed their contours as if the building were a lump of clay. The dome must appear to thrust upwards because of the apparent pressure created by flattening the building's angles and restraining its projections. If this explanation is the correct one, then the profile of the dome is not merely a structural solution, as perceived by Giacomo della Porta; it is part of the integrated design solution that is about visual tension and compression. In one sense, Michelangelo's dome may appear to look backward to the Gothic profile of Florence Cathedral and ignore the Classicism of the Renaissance, but on the other hand, perhaps more than any other building of the 16th century, it prefigures the architecture of the Baroque.

==== Completion ====
Giacomo della Porta and Domenico Fontana brought the dome to completion in 1590, the last year of the reign of Sixtus V. His successor, Gregory XIV, saw Fontana complete the lantern and had an inscription to the honour of Sixtus V placed around its inner opening. The next pope, Clement VIII, had the cross raised into place, an event which took all day, and was accompanied by the ringing of the bells of all the city's churches. In the arms of the cross are set two lead caskets, one containing a fragment of the True Cross and a relic of St. Andrew and the other containing medallions of the Holy Lamb.

In the mid-18th century, cracks appeared in the dome, so four iron chains were installed between the two shells to bind it, like the rings that keep a barrel from bursting. As many as ten chains have been installed at various times, the earliest possibly planned by Michelangelo himself as a precaution, as Brunelleschi did at Florence Cathedral.

Around the inside of the dome is written, in letters 1.4 metres (4.6 ft) high:

TV ES PETRVS ET SVPER HANC PETRAM AEDIFICABO ECCLESIAM MEAM ET TIBI DABO CLAVES REGNI CAELORVM
("... you are Peter, and on this rock I will build my church. ... and I will give you the keys of the kingdom of heaven ..." Vulgate, Matthew 16:18–19.)

Beneath the lantern is the inscription:

S. PETRI GLORIAE SIXTVS PP. V. A. M. D. XC. PONTIF. V.
(To the glory of St Peter; Sixtus V, pope, in the year 1590, the fifth of his pontificate.)

==== Discovery of Michelangelo draft ====
On 7 December 2007, a fragment of a red chalk drawing of a section of the dome of the basilica, almost certainly by the hand of Michelangelo, was discovered in the Vatican archives. The drawing shows a small precisely drafted section of the plan of the entablature above two of the radial columns of the cupola drum. Michelangelo is known to have destroyed thousands of his drawings before his death. The rare survival of this example is probably due to its fragmentary state and the fact that detailed mathematical calculations had been made over the top of the drawing.

=== Addition of nave and facade ===
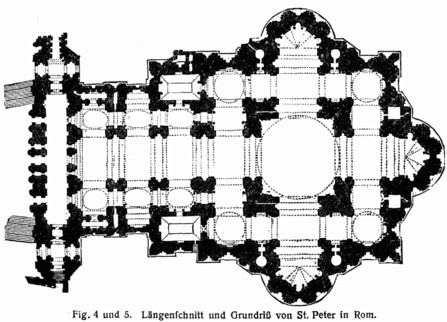
Michelangelo's plan extended with Maderno's nave and narthex

On 18 February 1606, under Pope Paul V, the dismantling of the remaining parts of the Constantinian basilica began. The marble cross that had been set at the top of the pediment by Pope Sylvester and Constantine the Great was lowered to the ground. The timbers were salvaged for the roof of the Borghese Palace and two rare black marble columns, the largest of their kind, were carefully stored and later used in the narthex. The tombs of various popes were opened, treasures removed and plans made for re-interment in the new basilica. The Pope had appointed Carlo Maderno in 1602. He was a nephew of Domenico Fontana and had demonstrated himself as a dynamic architect. Maderno's idea was to ring Michelangelo's building with chapels, but the Pope was hesitant about deviating from the master's plan, even though he had been dead for forty years. The Fabbrica or building committee, a group drawn from various nationalities and generally despised by the Curia who viewed the basilica as belonging to Rome rather than Christendom, were in a quandary as to how the building should proceed. One of the matters that influenced their thinking was the Counter-Reformation which increasingly associated a Greek Cross plan with paganism and saw the Latin Cross as truly symbolic of Christianity. The central plan also did not have a "dominant orientation toward the east."

Another influence on the thinking of both the Fabbrica and the Curia was a certain guilt at the demolition of the ancient building. The ground on which it and its various associated chapels, vestries and sacristies had stood for so long was hallowed. The only solution was to build a nave that encompassed the whole space. In 1607 a committee of ten architects was called together, and a decision was made to extend Michelangelo's building into a nave. Maderno's plans for both the nave and the facade were accepted.

The building of the nave began on 7 May 1607, and proceeded at a great rate, with an army of 700 labourers being employed. The following year, the façade was begun, in December 1614 the final touches were added to the stucco decoration of the vault and early in 1615 the partition wall between the two sections was pulled down. All the rubble was carted away, and the nave was ready for use by Palm Sunday.

==== Maderno's facade ====
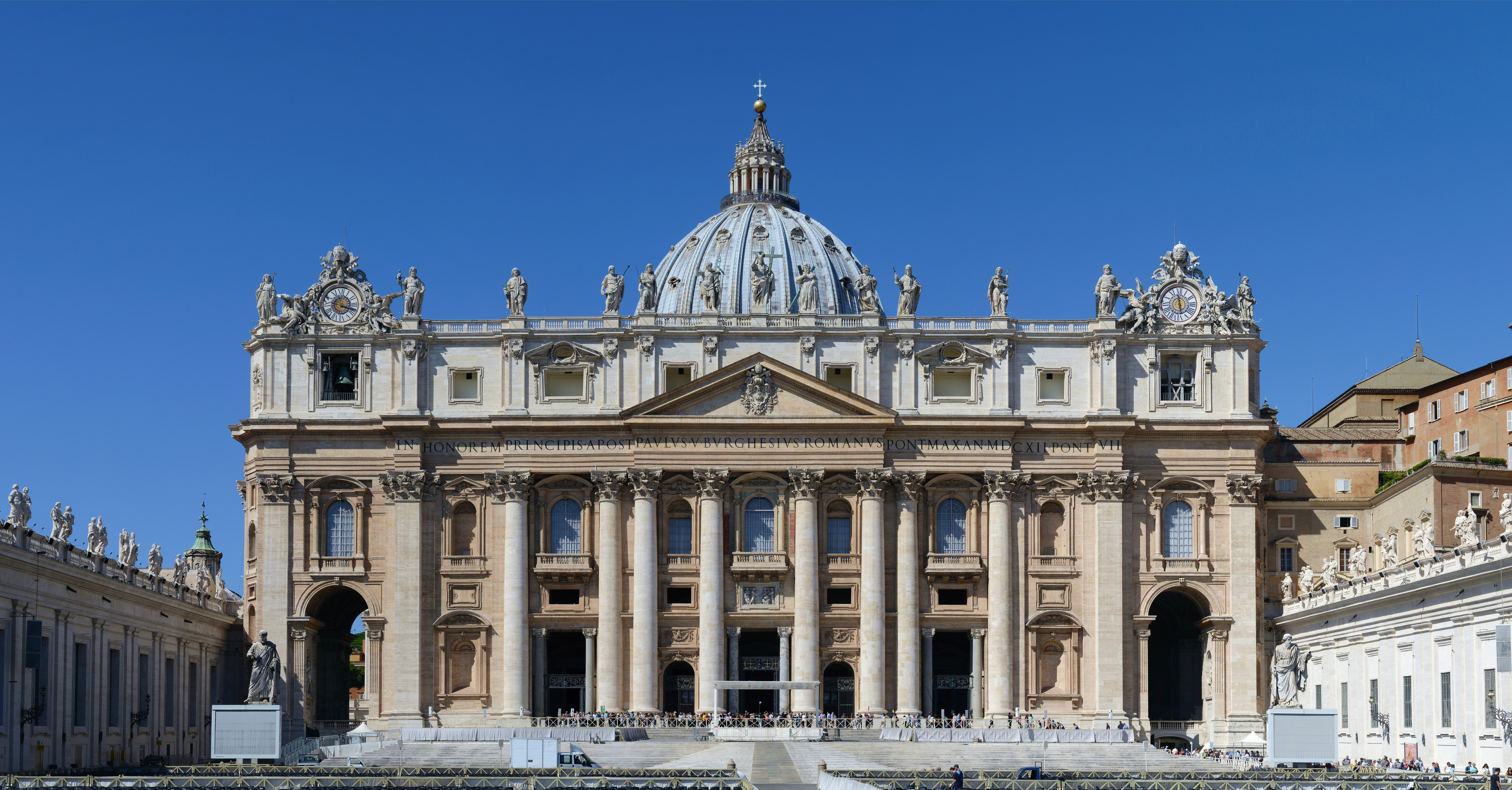
Maderno's façade, with the statues of Saint Peter (left) and Saint Paul (right) flanking the entrance stairs

The facade designed by Maderno, is 114.69 metres (376.3 ft) wide and 45.55 metres (149.4 ft) high and is built of travertine stone, with a giant order of Corinthian columns and a central pediment rising in front of a tall attic surmounted by thirteen statues: Christ flanked by eleven of the Apostles (except Saint Peter, whose statue is left of the stairs) and John the Baptist. (Note: Another view of the façade statues. From left to right: ① Thaddeus, ② Matthew, ③ Philip, ④ Thomas, ⑤ James the Elder, ⑥ John the Baptist (technically a 'precursor' and not an apostle); ⑦ Christ (centre, the only one with a halo); ⑧ Andrew, ⑨ John the Apostle, ⑩ James the Younger, ⑪ Bartholomew, ⑫ Simon and ⑬ Matthias. ("Unofficial architecture site". saintpetersbasilica.org.)) The inscription below the cornice on the 1 metre (3.3 ft) tall frieze reads:

IN HONOREM PRINCIPIS APOST PAVLVS V BVRGHESIVS ROMANVS PONT MAX AN MDCXII PONT VII
(In honour of the Prince of Apostles, Paul V Borghese, a Roman, Supreme Pontiff, in the year 1612, the seventh of his pontificate)

(Paul V (Camillo Borghese), born in Rome but of a Sienese family, liked to emphasize his "Romanness".)

The facade is often cited as the least satisfactory part of the design of St. Peter's. The reasons for this, according to James Lees-Milne, are that it was not given enough consideration by the Pope and committee because of the desire to get the building completed quickly, coupled with the fact that Maderno was hesitant to deviate from the pattern set by Michelangelo at the other end of the building. Lees-Milne describes the problems of the façade as being too broad for its height, too cramped in its details and too heavy in the attic story. The breadth is caused by modifying the plan to have towers on either side. These towers were never executed above the line of the facade because it was discovered that the ground was not sufficiently stable to bear the weight. One effect of the facade and lengthened nave is to screen the view of the dome, so that the building, from the front, has no vertical feature, except from a distance.

==== Bernini's Towers ====
Pope Urban had long been a critic of Bernini's predecessor, Carlo Maderno. His disapproval of the architect's work stemmed largely from Maderno's design for the longitudinal nave of St. Peters, which was widely condemned for obscuring Michelangelo's dome. When the Pope gave the commission to Bernini he therefore requested that a new design for the facade's bell towers to be submitted for consideration. Baldinucci describes Bernini's tower as consisting of "two orders of columns and pilasters, the first order being Corinthian" and "a third or attic story formed of pilasters and two columns on either side of the open archway in the center".

Pope Urban desired the towers to be completed by a very specific date: 29 June 1641, the feast day dedicated to Saints Peter and Paul. To this end an order was issued which stated that "all work should take a second seat to that of the campanile". The south tower was completed on time even in spite of these issues, but records show that in the wake of the unveiling the Pope was not content with what he saw and he ordered the top level of Bernini's tower removed so that the structure could be made even grander. The tower continued to grow, and as the construction began to settle, the first cracks started to appear followed by Urban's infamous public admonishment of his architect.

In 1642 all work on both towers came to a halt. Bernini had to pay the cost for the demolition; eventually the idea of completing the bell towers was abandoned.

==== Narthex and portals ====
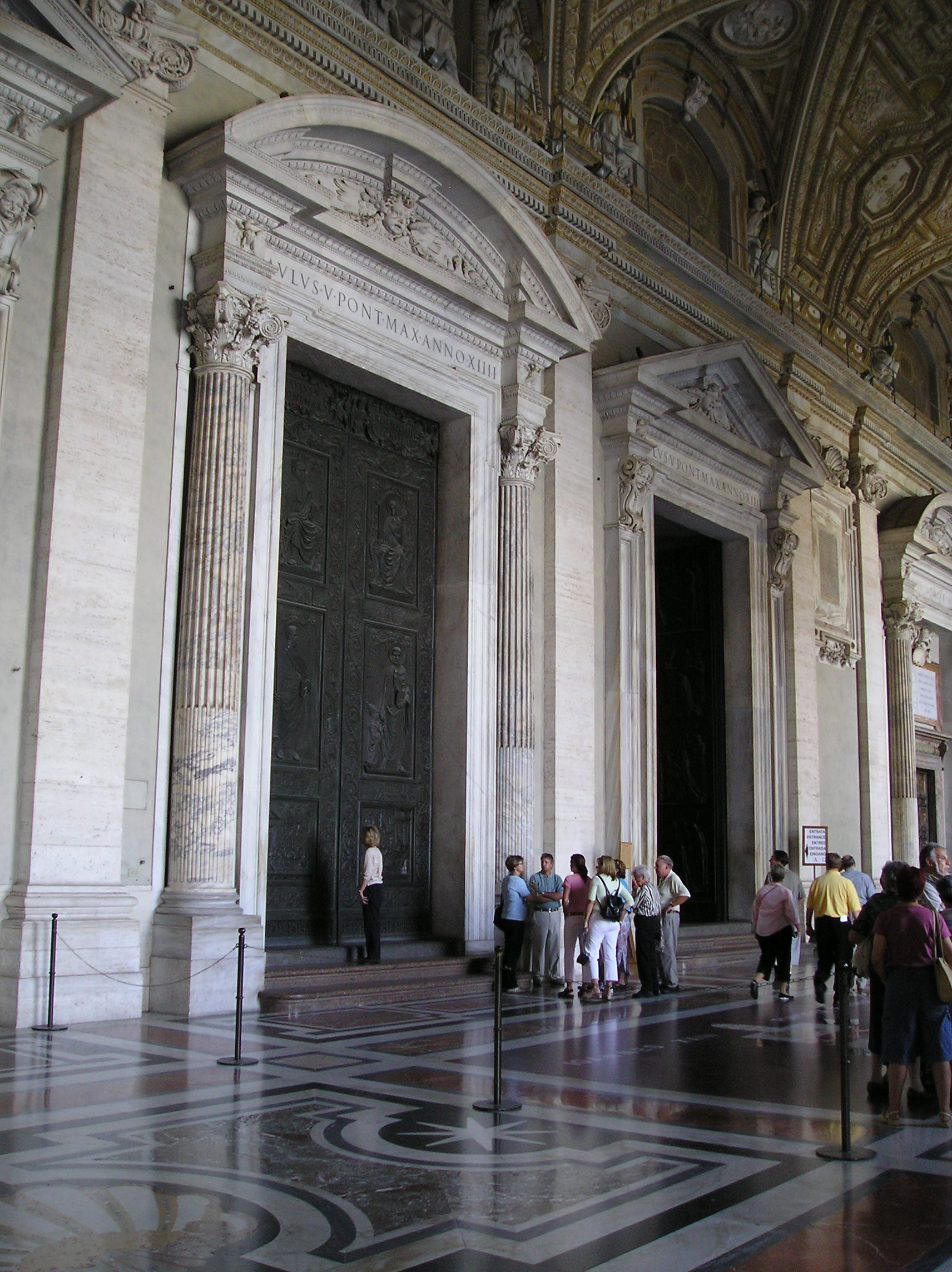
The narthex

Behind the façade of St. Peter's stretches a long portico or "narthex" such as was occasionally found in Italian churches. This is the part of Maderno's design with which he was most satisfied. Its long barrel vault is decorated with ornate stucco and gilt, and successfully illuminated by small windows between pendentives, while the ornate marble floor is beamed with light reflected in from the piazza. At each end of the narthex is a theatrical space framed by ionic columns and within each is set a statue, an equestrian statue of Charlemagne (18th century) by Cornacchini in the south end and The Vision of Constantine (1670) by Bernini in the north end.

Five portals, of which three are framed by huge salvaged antique columns, lead into the basilica. The central portal has a bronze door created by Antonio Averulino c. 1440 for the old basilica and somewhat enlarged to fit the new space.

==== Maderno's nave ====
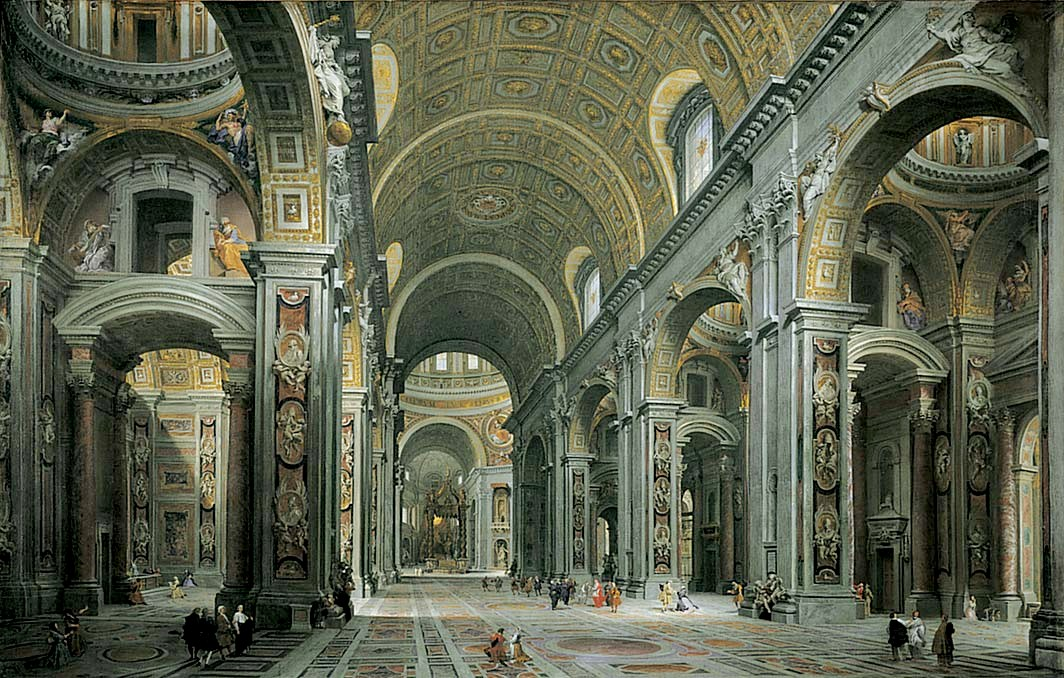
Maderno's nave, looking towards the chancel, as painted by Giovanni Paolo Pannini, 1731

To the single bay of Michelangelo's Greek Cross, Maderno added a further three bays. He made the dimensions slightly different from Michelangelo's bay, thus defining where the two architectural works meet. Maderno also tilted the axis of the nave slightly. This was not by accident, as suggested by his critics. An ancient Egyptian obelisk had been erected in the square outside, but had not been quite aligned with Michelangelo's building, so Maderno compensated, in order that it should, at least, align with the Basilica's façade.

The nave has huge paired pilasters, in keeping with Michelangelo's work. The size of the interior is so "stupendously large" that it is hard to get a sense of scale within the building. (Note: The word "stupendous" is used by a number of writers trying to adequately describe the enormity of the interior. These include James Lees-Milne and Banister Fletcher.) The four cherubs who flutter against the first piers of the nave, carrying between them two holy water basins, appear of quite normal cherubic size, until approached. Then it becomes apparent that each one is over 2 metres high and that real children cannot reach the basins unless they scramble up the marble draperies. The aisles each have two smaller chapels and a larger rectangular chapel, the Chapel of the Sacrament and the Choir Chapel. These are lavishly decorated with marble, stucco, gilt, sculpture and mosaic. Remarkably, all of the large altarpieces, with the exception of the Holy Trinity by Pietro da Cortona in the Blessed Sacrament Chapel, have been reproduced in mosaic. Two precious paintings from the old basilica, Our Lady of Perpetual Help and Our Lady of the Column are still being used as altarpieces.

Maderno's last work at St. Peter's was to design a crypt-like space or "Confessio" under the dome, where the cardinals and other privileged persons could descend in order to be nearer to the burial place of the apostle. Its marble steps are remnants of the old basilica and around its balustrade are 95 bronze lamps.

=== Influence on church architecture ===
The design of St. Peter's Basilica, and in particular its dome, has greatly influenced church architecture in Western Christendom. Within Rome, the huge domed church of Sant'Andrea della Valle was designed by Giacomo della Porta before the completion of St Peter's Basilica, and subsequently worked on by Carlo Maderno. This was followed by the domes of San Carlo ai Catinari, Sant'Agnese in Agone, and many others. Christopher Wren's dome at St Paul's Cathedral (London, England), the domes of Karlskirche (Vienna, Austria), St. Nicholas Church (Prague, Czech Republic), and the Pantheon (Paris, France) all pay homage to St Peter's Basilica.

The 19th and early-20th-century architectural revivals brought about the building of a great number of churches that imitate elements of St Peter's to a greater or lesser degree, including St. Mary of the Angels in Chicago, St. Josaphat's Basilica in Milwaukee, Immaculate Heart of Mary in Pittsburgh and Mary, Queen of the World Cathedral in Montreal, which replicates many aspects of St Peter's on a smaller scale. Postmodernism has seen free adaptations of St Peter's in the Basilica of Our Lady of Licheń, and the Basilica of Our Lady of Peace of Yamoussoukro.

== Bernini's furnishings ==
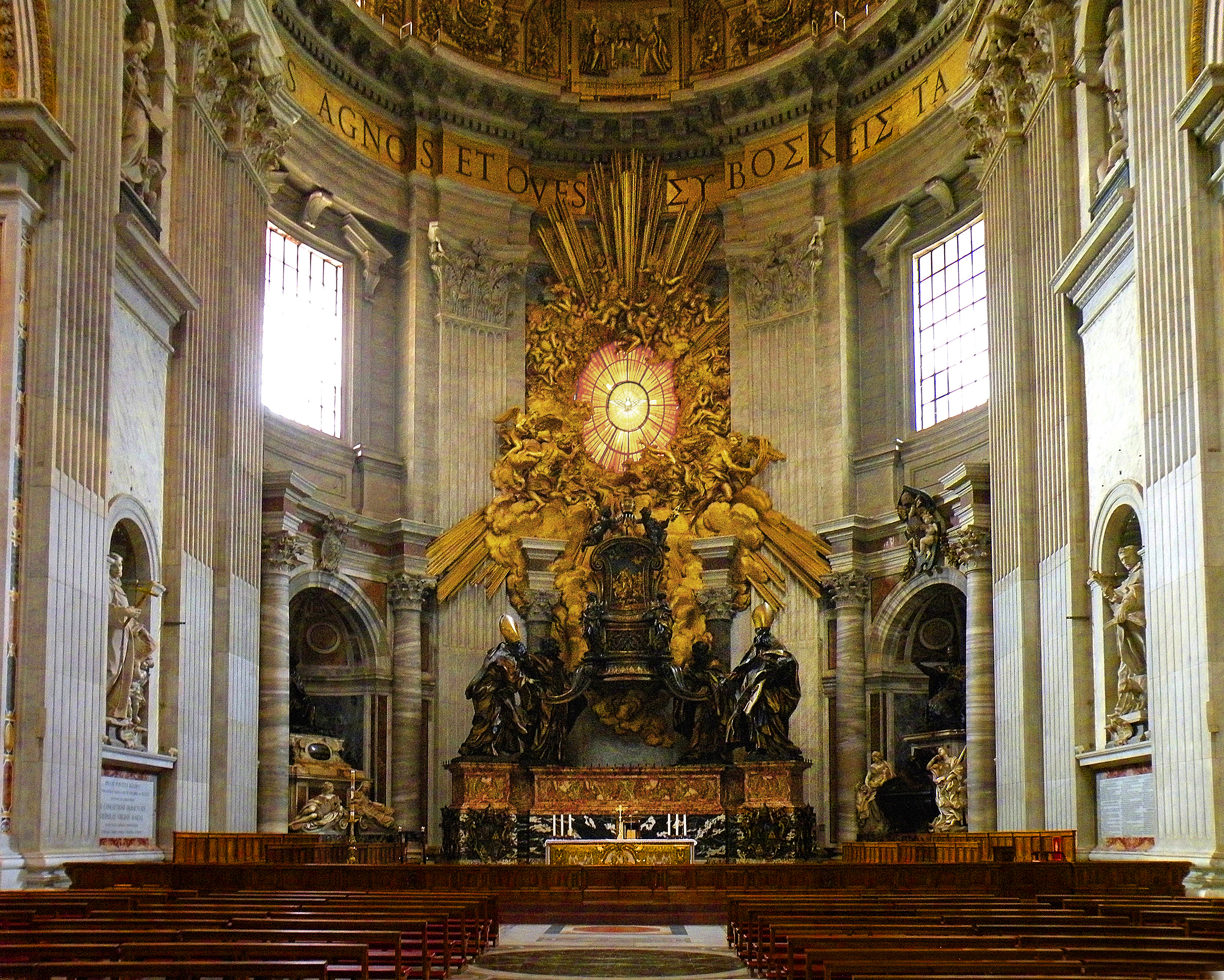
The apse with St. Peter's Cathedral supported by four Doctors of the Church

=== Pope Urban VIII and Bernini ===
As a young boy Gian Lorenzo Bernini (1598–1680) visited St. Peter's with the painter Annibale Carracci and stated his wish to build "a mighty throne for the apostle". His wish came true. As a young man, in 1626, he received the patronage of Pope Urban VIII and worked on the embellishment of the Basilica for 50 years. Appointed as Maderno's successor in 1629, he was to become regarded as the greatest architect and sculptor of the Baroque period. Bernini's works at St. Peter's include the baldachin (baldaquin, from Italian: baldacchino), the Chapel of the Sacrament, the plan for the niches and loggias in the piers of the dome and the chair of St. Peter.

==== Baldacchino and niches ====
Bernini's first work at St. Peter's was to design the baldacchino, a pavilion-like structure 28.74 metres (94.3 ft) tall and claimed to be the largest piece of bronze in the world, which stands beneath the dome and above the altar. Its design is based on the ciborium, of which there are many in the churches of Rome, serving to create a sort of holy space above and around the altar on which the Sacrament is laid for the Eucharist and emphasizing the significance of this ritual. These ciboria are generally of white marble, with inlaid coloured stone. Bernini's concept was for something very different. He took his inspiration in part from the baldachin or canopy carried above the head of the pope in processions, and in part from eight ancient columns that had formed part of a screen in the old basilica. Their twisted barley-sugar shape had a special significance as they were modelled on those of the Temple of Jerusalem and donated by the Emperor Constantine. Based on these columns, Bernini created four huge columns of bronze, twisted and decorated with laurel leaves and bees, which were the emblem of Pope Urban.

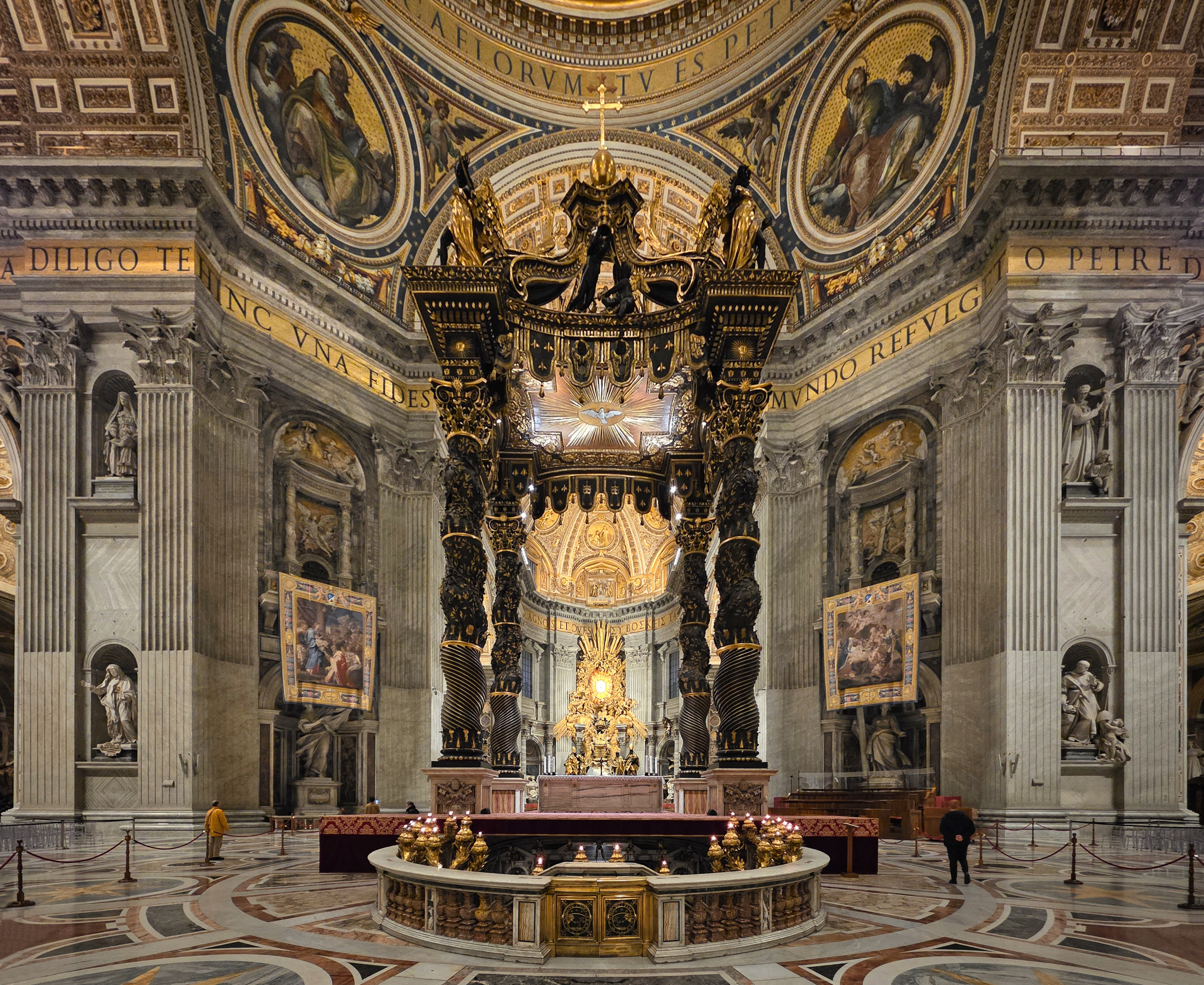
The altar with Bernini's baldacchino

The baldacchino is surmounted not with an architectural pediment, like most baldacchini, but with curved Baroque brackets supporting a draped canopy, like the brocade canopies carried in processions above precious iconic images. In this case, the draped canopy is of bronze, and all the details, including the olive leaves, bees, and the portrait heads of Urban's niece in childbirth and her newborn son, are picked out in gold leaf. The baldacchino stands as a vast free-standing sculptural object, central to and framed by the largest space within the building. It is so large that the visual effect is to create a link between the enormous dome which appears to float above it, and the congregation at floor level of the basilica. It is penetrated visually from every direction, and is visually linked to the Cathedra Petri in the apse behind it and to the four piers containing large statues that are at each diagonal.

As part of the scheme for the central space of the church, Bernini had the huge piers, begun by Bramante and completed by Michelangelo, hollowed out into niches, and had staircases made inside them, leading to four balconies. There was much dismay from those who thought that the dome might fall, but it did not. On the balconies Bernini created showcases, framed by the eight ancient twisted columns, to display the four most precious relics of the basilica: the spear of Longinus, said to have pierced the side of Christ, the veil of Veronica, with the miraculous image of the face of Christ, a fragment of the True Cross discovered in Jerusalem by Constantine's mother, Helena, and a relic of Saint Andrew, the brother of Saint Peter. In each of the niches that surround the central space of the basilica was placed a huge statue of the saint associated with the relic above. Only Saint Longinus is the work of Bernini. (See below)

==== Cathedra Petri and Chapel of the Blessed Sacrament ====
Bernini then turned his attention to another precious relic, the so-called Cathedra Petri or "throne of St. Peter" a chair which was often claimed to have been used by the apostle, but appears to date from the 12th century. As the chair itself was fast deteriorating and was no longer serviceable, Pope Alexander VII determined to enshrine it in suitable splendor as the object upon which the line of successors to Peter was based. Bernini created a large bronze throne in which it was housed, raised high on four looping supports held effortlessly by massive bronze statues of four Doctors of the Church, Saints Ambrose and Augustine representing the Latin Church and Athanasius and John Chrysostom, the Greek Church. The four figures are dynamic with sweeping robes and expressions of adoration and ecstasy. Behind and above the cathedra, a blaze of light comes in through a window of yellow alabaster, illuminating, at its centre, the Dove of the Holy Spirit. The elderly painter, Andrea Sacchi, had urged Bernini to make the figures large, so that they would be seen well from the central portal of the nave. The chair was enshrined in its new home with great celebration of 16 January 1666. Bernini's final work for St. Peter's, undertaken in 1676, was the decoration of the Chapel of the Sacrament. To hold the sacramental Host, he designed a miniature version in gilt bronze of Bramante's Tempietto, the little chapel that marks the place of the death of St. Peter. On either side is an angel, one gazing in rapt adoration and the other looking towards the viewer in welcome. Bernini died in 1680 in his 82nd year.

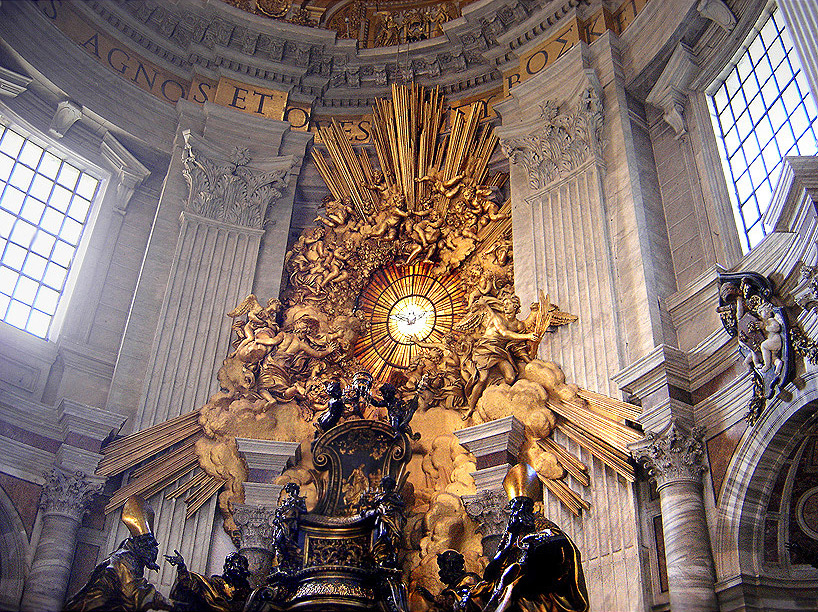
Bernini's Cathedra Petri and Gloria

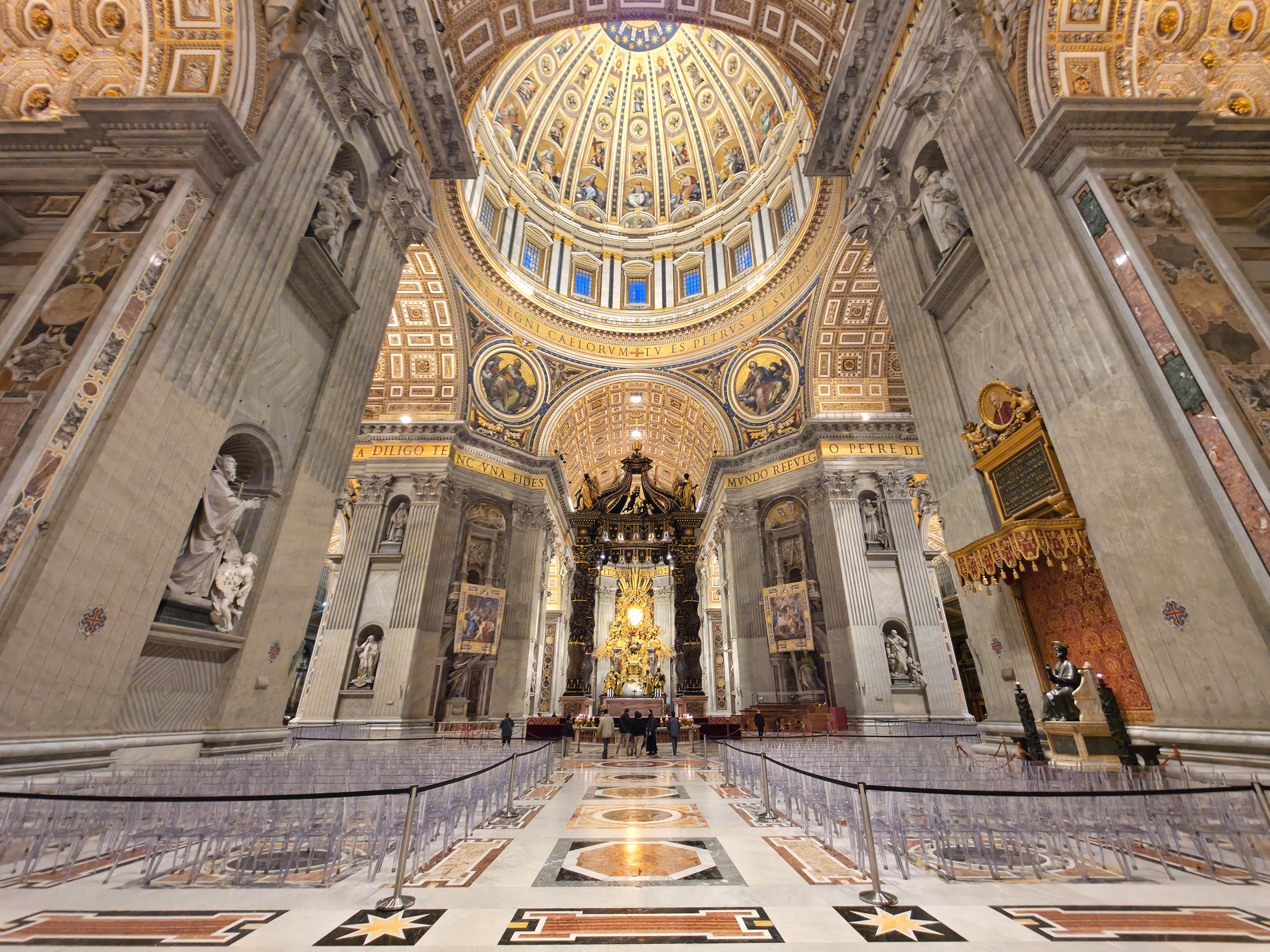
Wide angle image showing the dome, altar, and Gloria

== St. Peter's Piazza ==
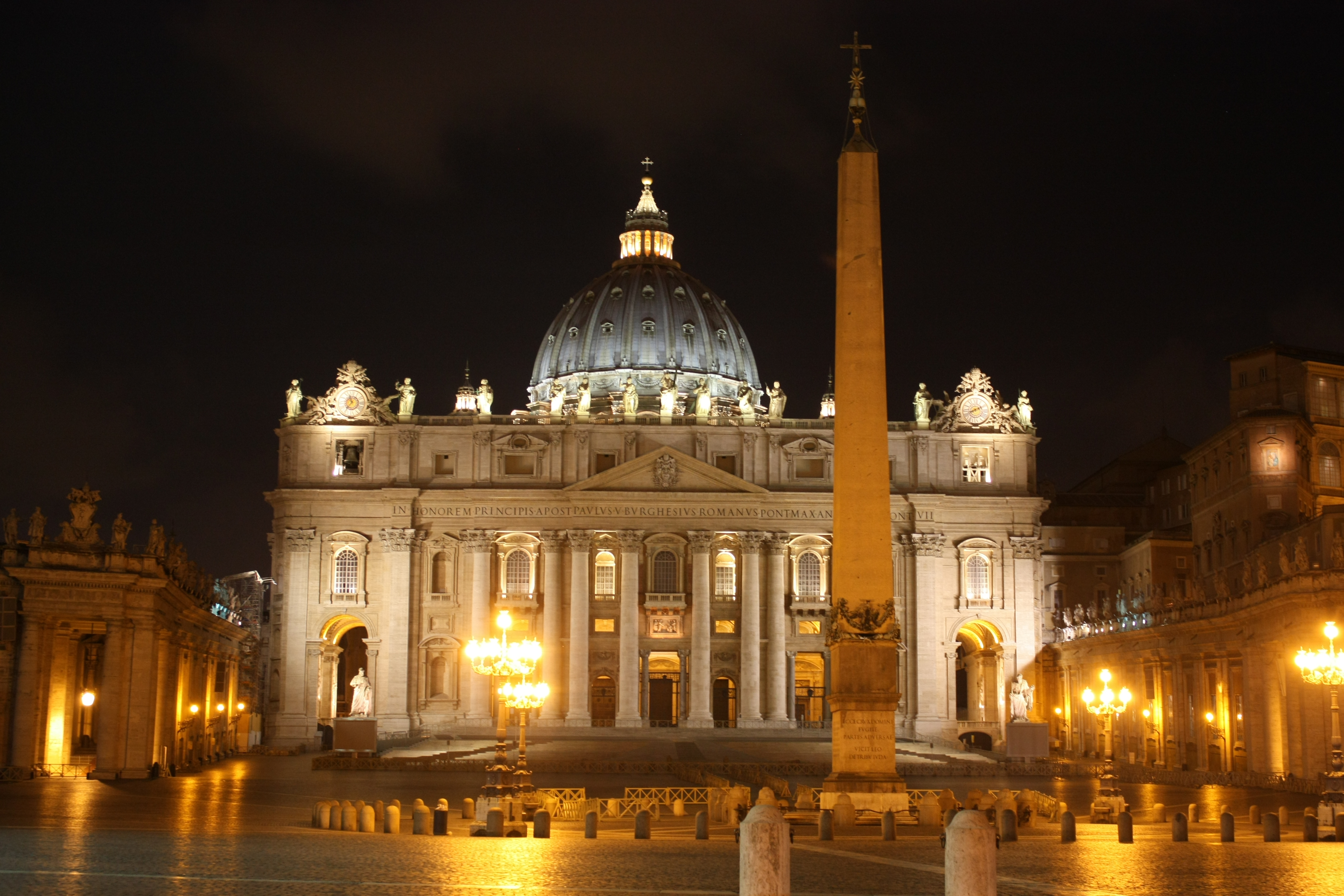
St. Peter's Basilica and the piazza at night

To the east of the basilica is the Piazza di San Pietro, (St. Peter's Square). The present arrangement, constructed between 1656 and 1667, is the Baroque inspiration of Bernini who inherited a location already occupied by an Egyptian obelisk which was centrally placed, (with some contrivance) to Maderno's facade. (Note: The obelisk was originally erected at Heliopolis by an unknown pharaoh of the Fifth dynasty of Egypt (c. 2494 BC – 2345 BC).) The obelisk, known as "The Witness", at 25.31 metres (83.0 ft) and a total height, including base and the cross on top, of 40 metres (130 ft), is the second largest standing obelisk, and the only one to remain standing since its removal from Egypt and re-erection at the Circus of Nero in 37 AD, where it is thought to have stood witness to the crucifixion of Saint Peter. Its removal to its present location by order of Pope Sixtus V and engineered by Domenico Fontana on 28 September 1586, was an operation fraught with difficulties and nearly ended in disaster when the ropes holding the obelisk began to smoke from the friction. Fortunately this problem was noticed by Benedetto Bresca, a sailor of Sanremo, and for his swift intervention, his town was granted the privilege of providing the palms that are used at the basilica each Palm Sunday.

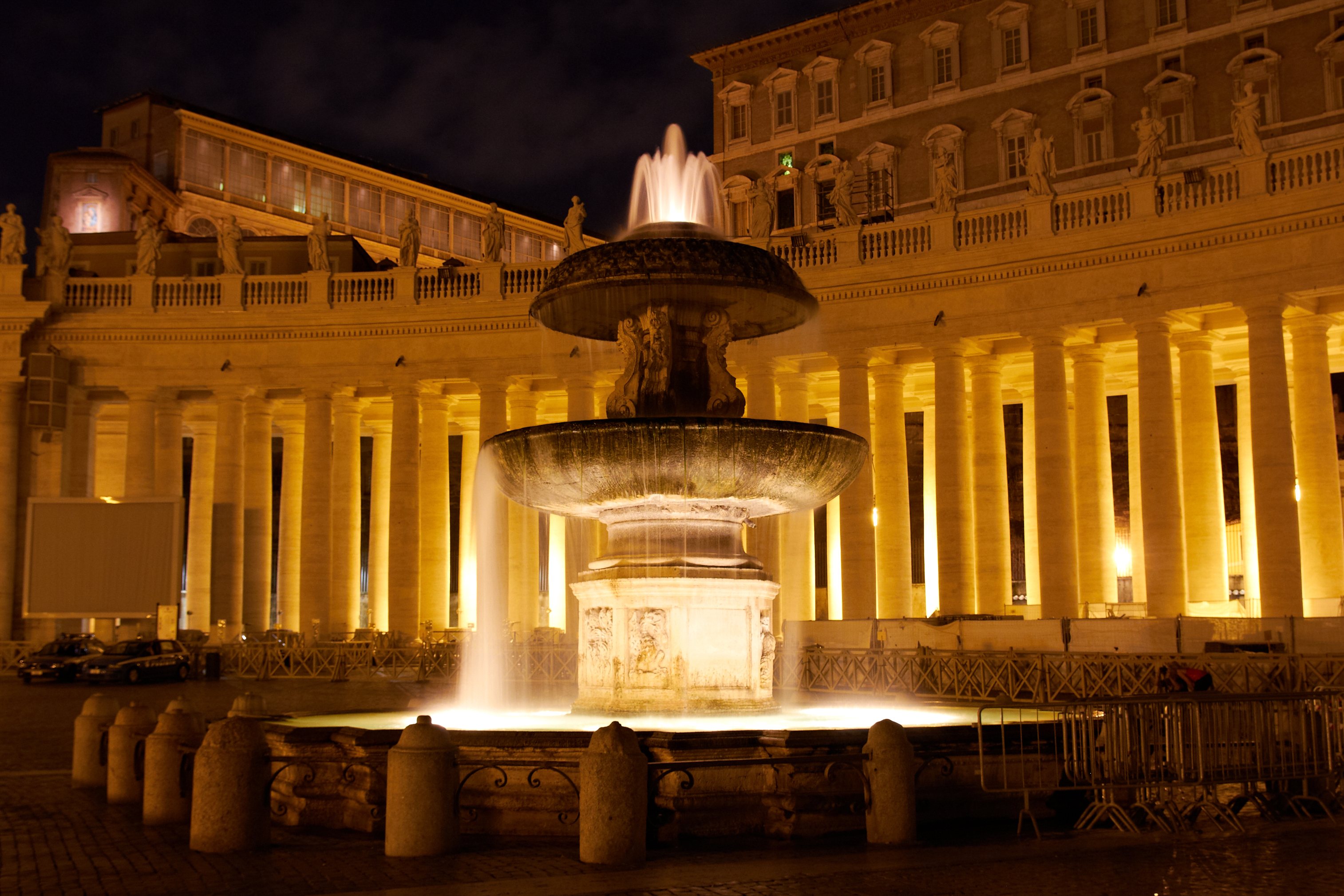
One of the two fountains which form the axis of the piazza

The other object in the old square with which Bernini had to contend was a large fountain designed by Maderno in 1613 and set to one side of the obelisk, making a line parallel with the facade. Bernini's plan uses this horizontal axis as a major feature of his unique, spatially dynamic and highly symbolic design. The most obvious solutions were either a rectangular piazza of vast proportions so that the obelisk stood centrally and the fountain (and a matching companion) could be included, or a trapezoid piazza which fanned out from the facade of the basilica like that in front of the Palazzo Pubblico in Siena. The problems of the square plan are that the necessary width to include the fountain would entail the demolition of numerous buildings, including some of the Vatican, and would minimize the effect of the facade. The trapezoid plan, on the other hand, would maximize the apparent width of the facade, which was already perceived as a fault of the design.

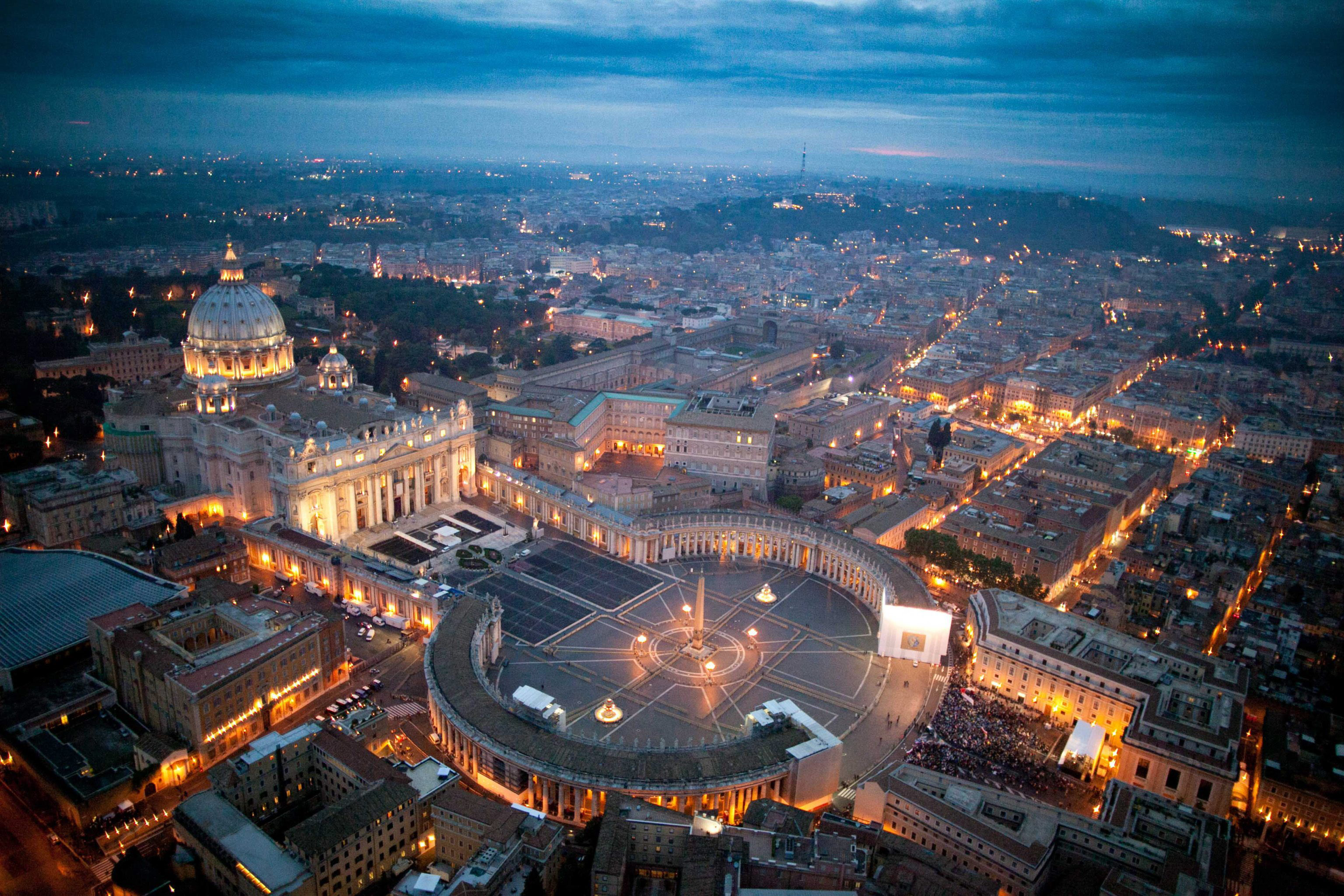
Evening aerial view of the piazza and facade

Bernini's ingenious solution was to create a piazza in two sections. That part which is nearest the basilica is trapezoid, but rather than fanning out from the facade, it narrows. This gives the effect of countering the visual perspective. It means that from the second part of the piazza, the building looks nearer than it is, the breadth of the facade is minimized and its height appears greater in proportion to its width. The second section of the piazza is a huge elliptical circus which gently slopes downwards to the obelisk at its centre. The two distinct areas are framed by a colonnade formed by doubled pairs of columns supporting an entablature of the simple Tuscan Order.

The part of the colonnade that is around the ellipse does not entirely encircle it, but reaches out in two arcs, symbolic of the arms of "the Catholic Church reaching out to welcome its communicants". The obelisk and Maderno's fountain mark the widest axis of the ellipse. Bernini balanced the scheme with another fountain in 1675. The approach to the square used to be through a jumble of old buildings, which added an element of surprise to the vista that opened up upon passing through the colonnade. Nowadays a long wide street, the Via della Conciliazione, built by Mussolini after the conclusion of the Lateran Treaties, leads from the River Tiber to the piazza and gives distant views of St. Peter's as the visitor approaches, with the basilica acting as a terminating vista.

Bernini's transformation of the site is entirely Baroque in concept. Where Bramante and Michelangelo conceived a building that stood in "self-sufficient isolation", Bernini made the whole complex "expansively relate to its environment". Banister Fletcher says "No other city has afforded such a wide-swept approach to its cathedral church, no other architect could have conceived a design of greater nobility ... (it is) the greatest of all atriums before the greatest of all churches of Christendom."

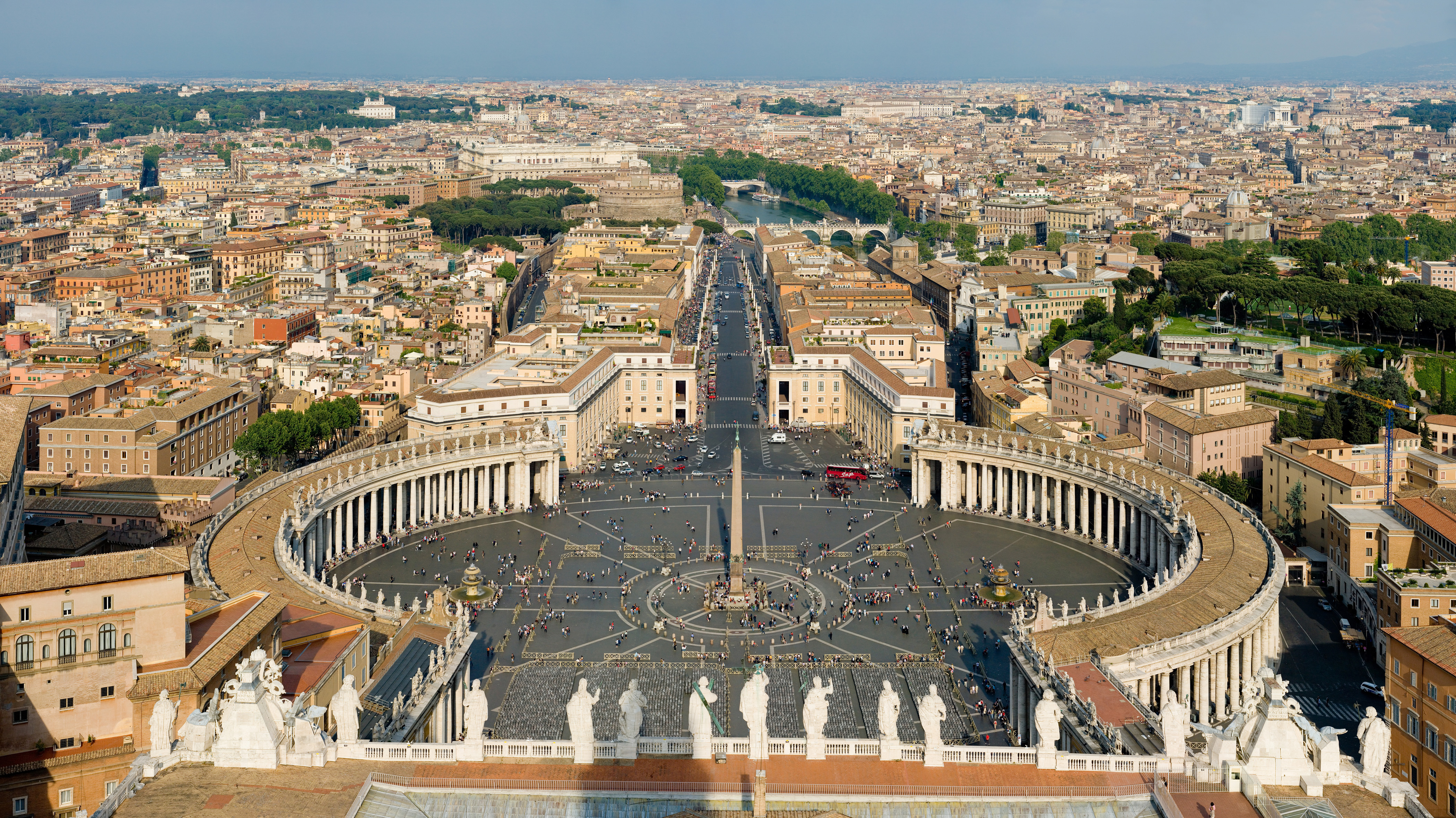
View of Rome from the Dome of St. Peter's Basilica

== Clocks ==
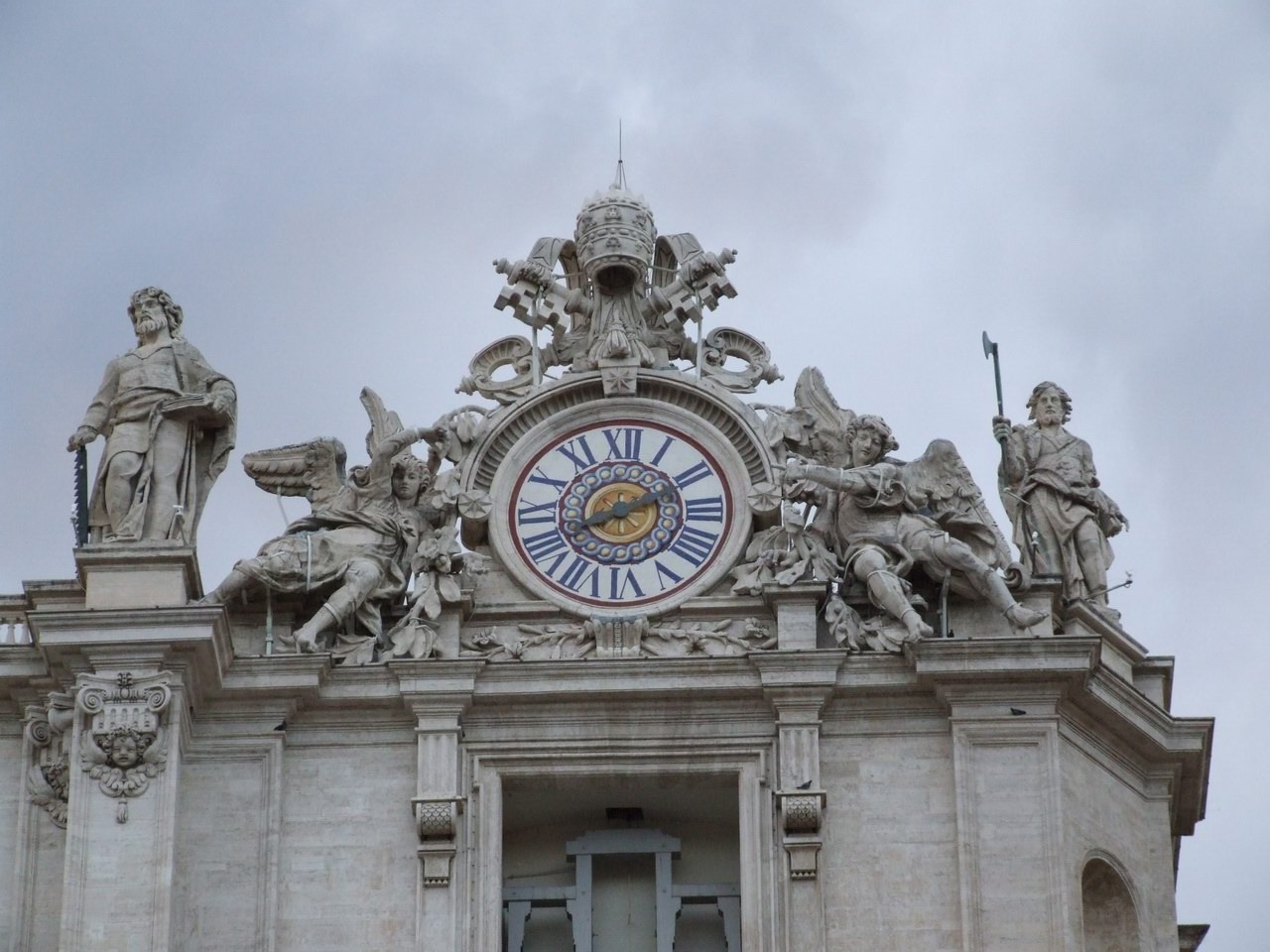
The "Italian clock" above the northern corner of St. Peter’s facade

The top of the facade of St. Peter's Basilica has two clocks and several sculptures. The clocks were created to replace Bernini's bell towers which had to be torn down due to insufficient support. The left hand clock shows Rome time, the right hand one shows European mean time. The statues are Christ the Redeemer, St. John the Baptist and 11 Apostles. From the left: St. Thadeus, St. Matthew, St. Philip, St. Thomas, St. James the Greater, St. John the Baptist, The Redeemer, St. Andrew, St. John the Evangelist, St. James the Lesser, St. Bartholomew, St. Simeon, and St. Matthias. Above the Roman clock is the coat of arms for the city-state of Vatican City since 1931 held by two angels.

== Bells ==
The Basilica has 6 bells, placed in the room under the Roman clock, only 3 of them are visible from ground level while the rest are hidden behind the bourdon. They range from the smallest which is 235 kg to the massive bourdon that approximately weighs 9 tonnes. From 1931, the bells are operated electrically, thus permitting even the largest bell to be tolled from a distance. The oldest bell Rota dates from 1353, and the bourdon called Campanone is rung at Christmas and Easter, on the Solemnity of Sts. Peter and Paul, and every time the Pope imparts the "Urbi et Orbi" blessing to the city and to the world. Campanone also announces the death of the pope and an election of a new pope.

Bell#	Name	Mass	Date cast
1	Campanella	235 kg	1825
2	Ave Maria	250 kg	1932
3	Predica	830 kg	1909
4	Rota	1815 kg	1353
5	Campanoncino (Mezzana, Benedittina)	3640 kg	1725
6	Campanone	8950 kg	1785

== Treasures ==
=== Tombs and relics ===
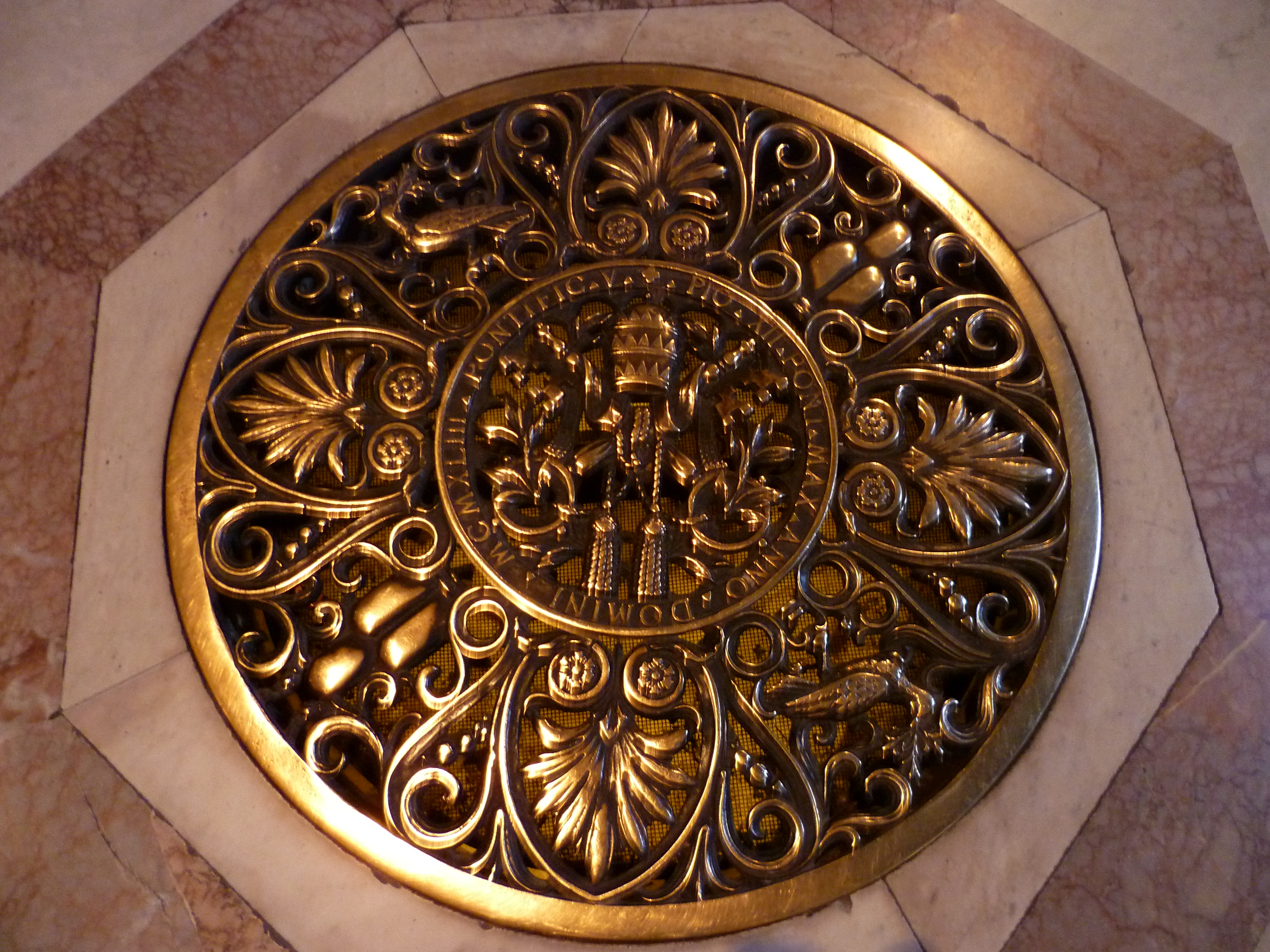
Air vents for the crypt in St. Peter's Basilica

There are over 100 tombs within St. Peter's Basilica (extant to various extents), many located beneath the Basilica. These include 91 popes, Saint Ignatius of Antioch, Holy Roman Emperor Otto II, and the composer Giovanni Pierluigi da Palestrina. Also buried here are Queen Christina of Sweden, who abdicated her throne in order to convert to Catholicism, and Countess Matilda of Tuscany, supporter of the Papacy during the Investiture Controversy, as well as British royal Jacobites of the exiled House of Stuart granted asylum by Pope Clement XI, namely James Francis Edward, his wife Maria Clementina Sobieska, and their sons, Charles Edward and Henry Benedict, Cardinal-Bishop of Frascati. The most recent interment was Pope Benedict XVI, on 5 January 2023. Beneath, near the crypt, is the recently discovered vaulted fourth-century "Tomb of the Julii". (See below for some descriptions of tombs).

=== Artworks ===
==== Towers and narthex ====
- In the towers to either side of the facade are two clocks. The clock on the left has been operated electrically since 1931. Its oldest bell dates from 1288.
- One of the most important treasures of the basilica is a mosaic set above the central external door. Called the "Navicella", it is based on a design by Giotto (early 14th century) and represents a ship symbolizing the Christian Church. The mosaic is mostly a 17th-century copy of Giotto's original.
- At each end of the narthex is an equestrian figure, to the north Constantine the Great by Bernini (1670) and to the south Charlemagne by Cornacchini (18th century).
- Of the five portals from the narthex to the interior, three contain notable doors. The central portal has the Renaissance bronze door by Antonio Averulino (called Filarete) (1455), enlarged to fit the new space. The southern door, the Door of the Dead, was designed by 20th-century sculptor Giacomo Manzù and includes a portrait of Pope John XXIII kneeling before the crucified figure of Saint Peter.
- The northernmost door is the "Holy Door" which, by tradition, is walled-up with bricks, and opened only for holy years such as the Jubilee year by the Pope. The present door is bronze and was designed by Vico Consorti in 1950 and cast in Florence by the Ferdinando Marinelli Artistic Foundry. Above it are inscriptions commemorating the opening of the door: PAVLVS V PONT MAX ANNO XIII and GREGORIVS XIII PONT MAX.

Recently installed commemorative plaques read above the door as follows:

PAVLVS VI PONT MAX HVIVS PATRIARCALIS VATICANAE BASILICAE PORTAM SANCTAM APERVIT ET CLAVSIT ANNO IVBILAEI MCMLXXV
(Paul VI, Pontifex Maximus, opened and closed the holy door of this patriarchal Vatican basilica in the jubilee year of 1975.)

IOANNES PAVLVS II P.M. PORTAM SANCTAM ANNO IVBILAEI MCMLXXVI A PAVLO PP VI RESERVATAM ET CLAVSAM APERVIT ET CLAVSIT ANNO IVB HVMANE REDEMP MCMLXXXIII–MCMLXXXIV
(John Paul II, Pontifex Maximus, opened and closed again the holy door closed and set apart by Pope Paul VI in 1976 in the jubilee year of human redemption 1983–1984.)

IOANNES PAVLVS II P.M. ITERVM PORTAM SANCTAM APERVIT ET CLAVSIT ANNO MAGNI IVBILAEI AB INCARNATIONE DOMINI MM–MMI
(John Paul II, Pontifex Maximus, again opened and closed the holy door in the year of the great jubilee, from the incarnation of the Lord 2000–2001.)

FRANCISCVS PP. PORTAM SANCTAM ANNO MAGNI IVB MM–MMI A IOANNE PAVLO PP. II RESERVATAM ET CLAVSAM APERVIT ET CLAVSIT ANNO IVB MISERICORDIAE MMXV–MMXVI
(Pope Francis opened and closed again the holy door, closed and set apart by Pope John Paul II in the year of the great jubilee 2000–2001, in the jubilee year of Mercy 2015–2016.)

Older commemorative plaques are removed to make way for the new plaque when the holy door is opened and sealed.

==== Nave ====
- On the first piers of the nave are two Holy Water basins held by pairs of cherubs each two metres high, commissioned by Pope Benedict XIII from designer Agostino Cornacchini and sculptor Francesco Moderati, (1720s).
- Along the floor of the nave are markers showing the comparative lengths of other churches, starting from the entrance.
- On the decorative pilasters of the piers of the nave are medallions with relief depicting 56 of the first popes.
- In niches between the pilasters of the nave are statues depicting 39 founders of religious orders.
- Set against the north east pier of the dome is a statue of Saint Peter Enthroned, sometimes attributed to late 13th-century sculptor Arnolfo di Cambio, with some scholars dating it to the fifth century. One foot of the statue is largely worn away by pilgrims kissing it for centuries.
- The sunken Confessio leading to the Vatican Grottoes (see above) contained a large kneeling statue by Canova of Pope Pius VI, who was captured and mistreated by Napoleon Bonaparte's army. This has now been moved to the back (eastern) end of the grottoes.
- In the Confessio is the Niche of the Pallium ("Niche of Stoles") which contains a bronze urn, donated by Pope Benedict XIV, to contain white stoles embroidered with black crosses and woven with the wool of lambs blessed on the feastday of St. Agnes.
- The High Altar is surmounted by Bernini's baldachin. (See above)
- Set in niches within the four piers supporting the dome are the larger-than-life statues associated with the basilica's primary holy relics: Saint Helena holding the True Cross and the Holy Nails, by Andrea Bolgi; Saint Longinus holding the spear that pierced the side of Jesus, by Bernini (1639); Saint Andrew with the St. Andrew's Cross, by Francois Duquesnoy and Saint Veronica holding her veil with the image of Jesus' face, by Francesco Mochi.
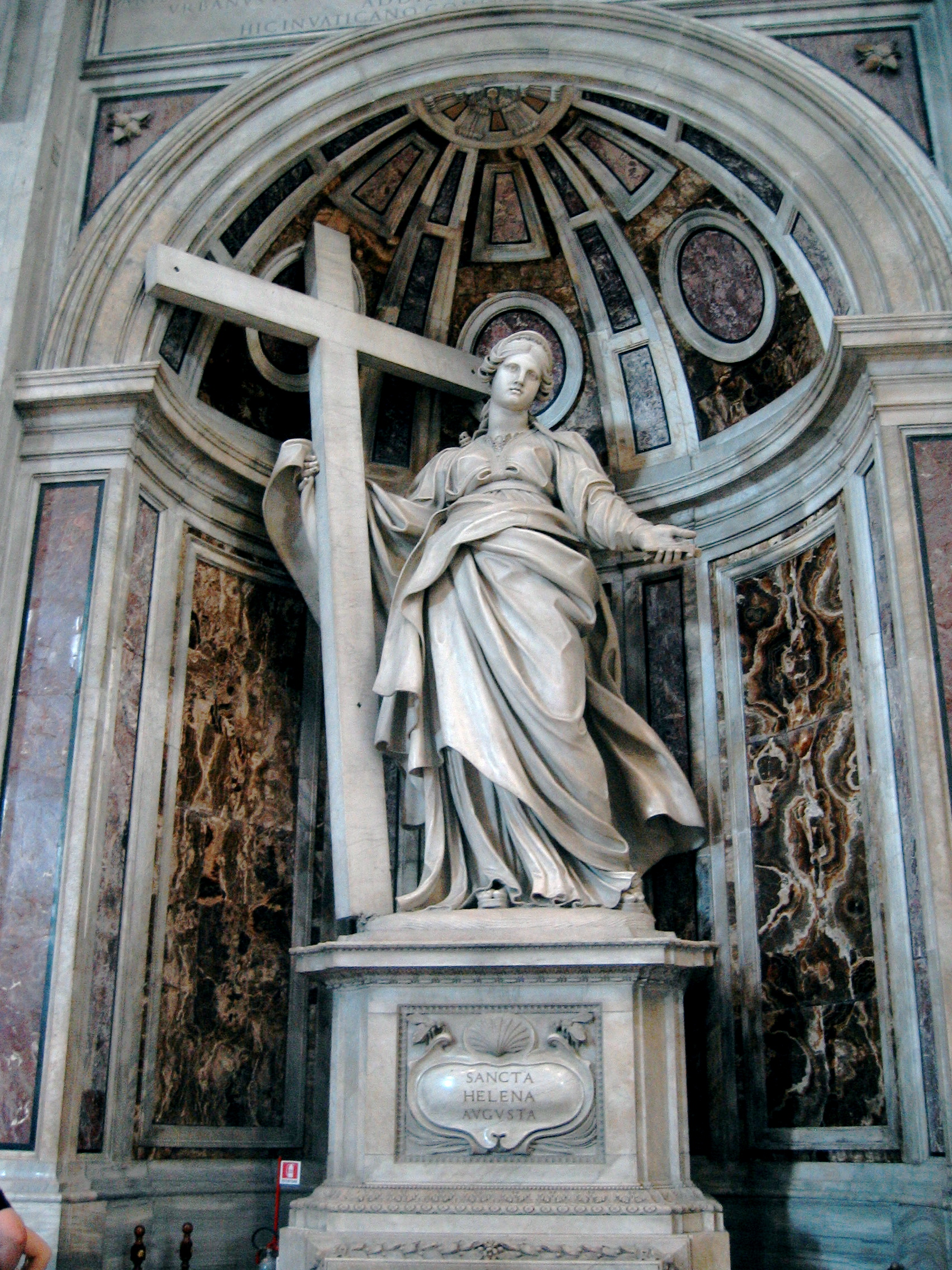
Saint Helena
by Andrea Bolgi

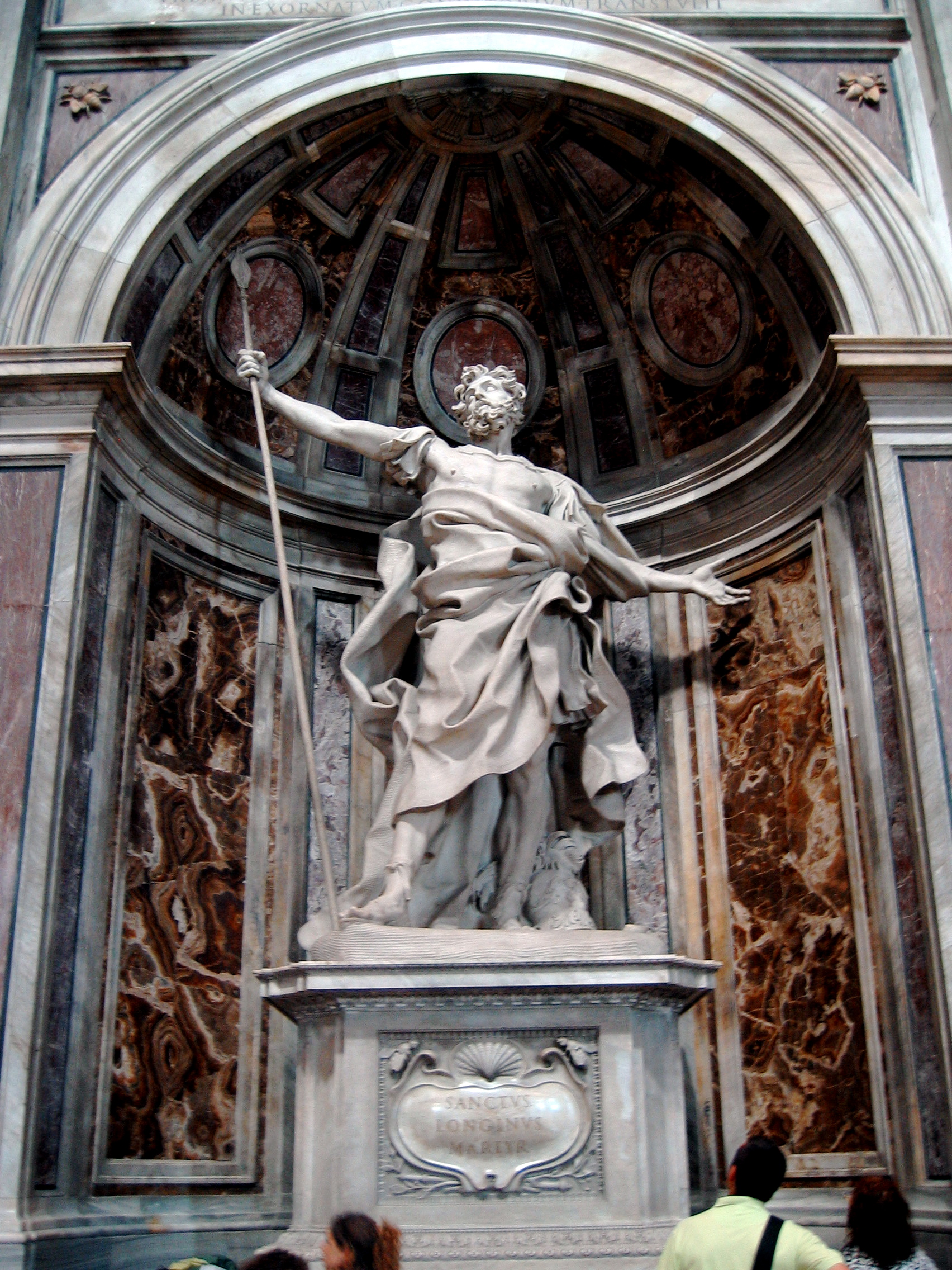
Saint Longinus
by Bernini

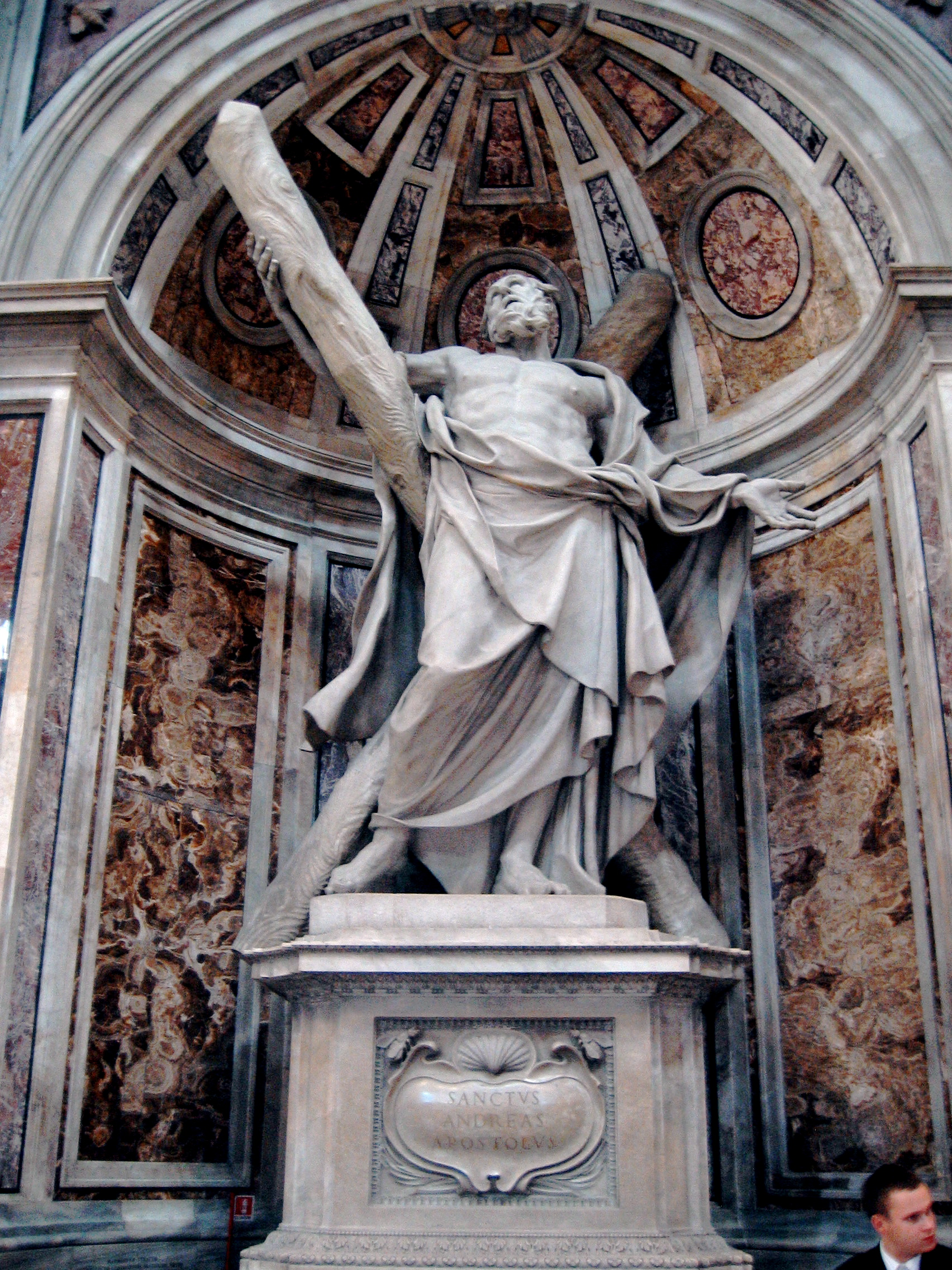
Saint Andrew
by Francois Duquesnoy

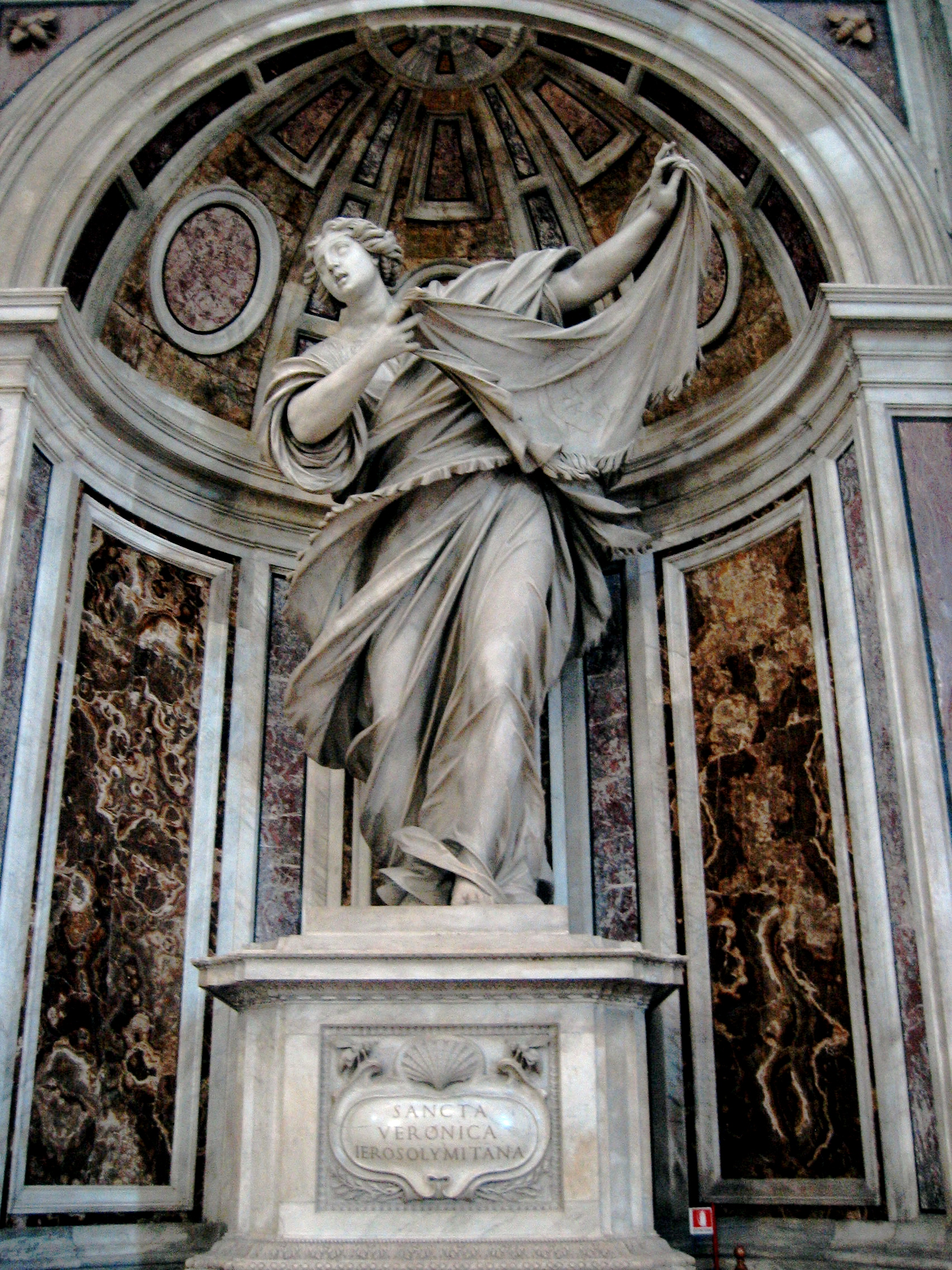
Saint Veronica
by Francesco Mochi

==== North aisle ====
- In the first chapel of the north aisle is Michelangelo's Pietà. (Note: The statue was damaged in 1972 by Lazlo Toft, a Hungarian-Australian, who considered that the veneration shown to the statue was idolatrous. The damage was repaired and the statue subsequently placed behind glass.)
- On the first pier in the right aisle is the monument of Queen Christina of Sweden, who abdicated in 1654 in order to convert to Catholicism.
- The second chapel, dedicated to Saint Sebastian, contains the statues of popes Pius XI and Pius XII. The space below the altar used to be the resting place of Pope Innocent XI but his remains were moved to the Altar of the Transfiguration on 8 April 2011. This was done to make way for the body of Pope John Paul II. His remains were placed beneath the altar on 2 May 2011.
- The large chapel on the right aisle is the Chapel of the Blessed Sacrament which contains the tabernacle by Bernini (1664) resembling Bramante's Tempietto at San Pietro in Montorio supported by two kneeling angels and with behind it a painting of the Holy Trinity by Pietro da Cortona.
- Near the altar of Our Lady of Succour are the monuments of popes Gregory XIII by Camillo Rusconi (1723) and Gregory XIV.
- At the end of the aisle is an altar containing the relics of Saint Petronilla and with an altarpiece The Burial of St Petronilla by Guercino (Giovanni Francesco Barbieri), 1623.

==== South aisle ====
- The first chapel in the south aisle is the baptistry, commissioned by Pope Innocent XII and designed by Carlo Fontana, (great nephew of Domenico Fontana). The font was carved from the lid of the purple porphyry sarcophagus which had once held the remains of the Emperor Hadrian, and is surmounted with a gilt-bronze figure of the "Lamb of God". Fontana's reworked porphyry sarcophagus lid font replaced an earlier font, which was re-purposed from the sarcophagus of Probus, the fourth-century Prefect of Rome, and which was used for baptisms from the 15th century until the late 17th century, when Fontana's work was completed.
- Against the first pier of the aisle is the Monument to the Royal Stuarts: James Stuart, known as the "Old Pretender" and his sons, Charles Edward, known as "Bonnie Prince Charlie", and Henry, a cardinal. The tomb is a Neo-Classical design by Canova unveiled in 1819. Opposite it is the memorial of James Francis Edward Stuart's wife, Maria Clementina Sobieska.
- The second chapel is that of the Presentation of the Virgin and contains the memorials of Pope Benedict XV and Pope John XXIII.
- Against the piers are the tombs of Pope Pius X and Pope Innocent VIII.
- The large chapel off the south aisle is the Choir Chapel which contains the altar of the Immaculate Conception.
- At the entrance to the Sacristy is the tomb of Pope Pius VIII
- The south transept contains the altars of Saint Thomas, Saint Joseph and the Crucifixion of Saint Peter.
- The tomb of Fabio Chigi, Pope Alexander VII, towards the end of the aisle, is the work of Bernini and called by Lees-Milne "one of the greatest tombs of the Baroque Age". It occupies an awkward position, being set in a niche above a doorway into a small vestry, but Bernini has utilized the doorway in a symbolic manner. Pope Alexander kneels upon his tomb, facing outward. The tomb is supported on a large draped shroud in patterned red marble, and is supported by four female figures, of whom only the two at the front are fully visible. They represent Charity and Truth. The foot of Truth rests upon a globe of the world, her toe being pierced symbolically by the thorn of Protestant England. Coming forth, seemingly, from the doorway as if it were the entrance to a tomb, is the skeletal winged figure of Death, its head hidden beneath the shroud, but its right hand carrying an hourglass stretched upward towards the kneeling figure of the pope.
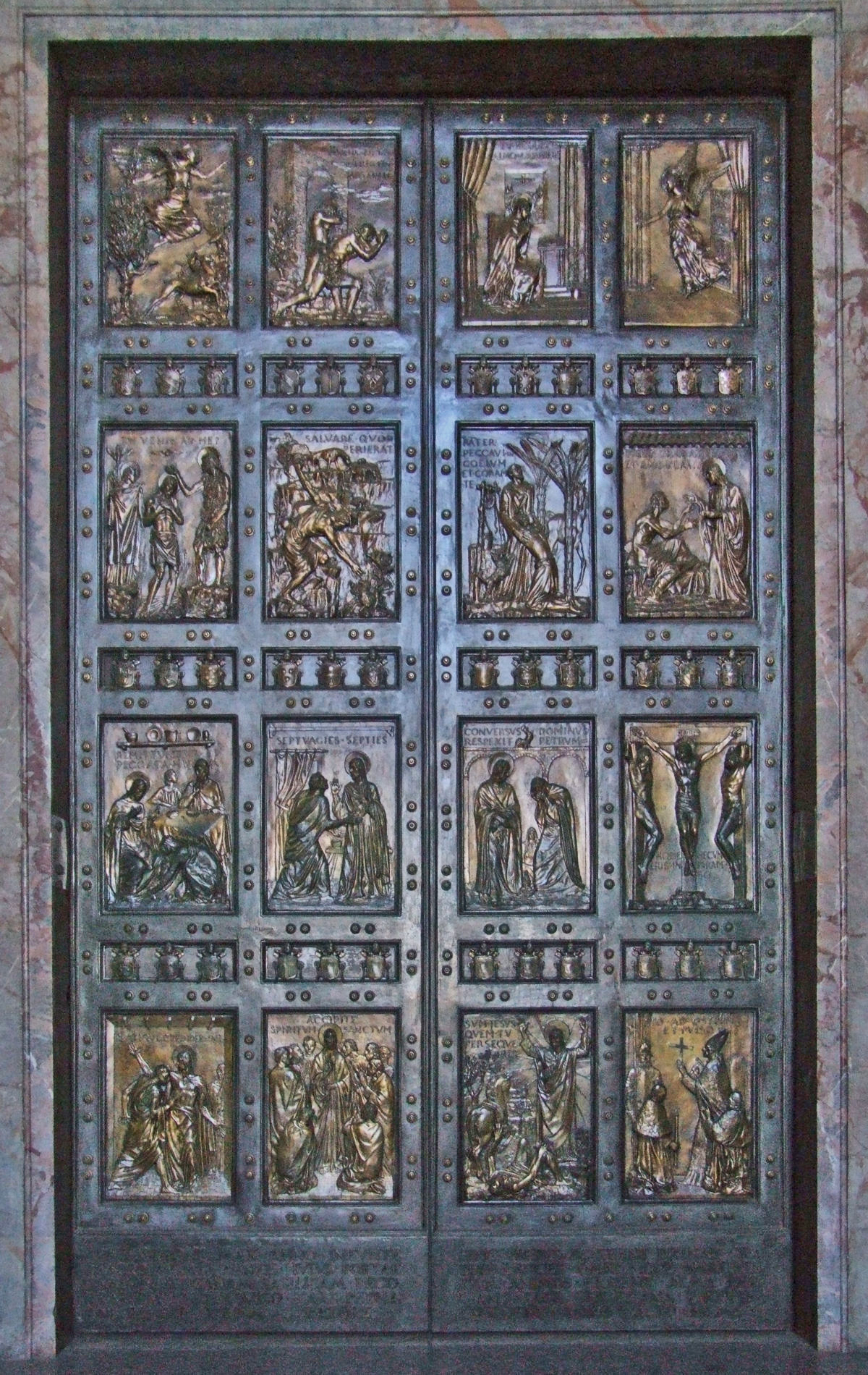
The Holy Door is opened only for great celebrations.

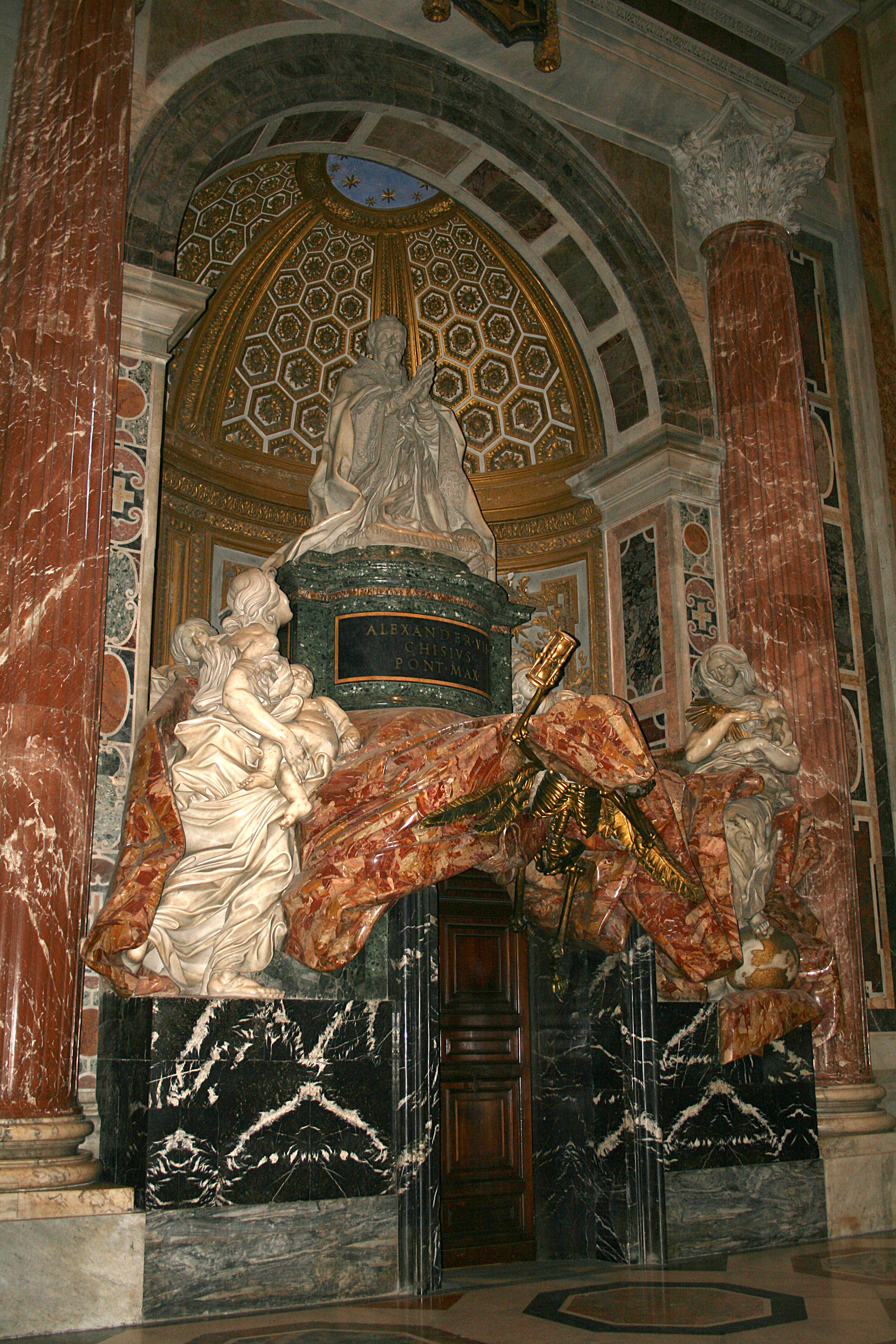
The tomb of Alexander VII, by Gian Lorenzo Bernini, 1671–1678

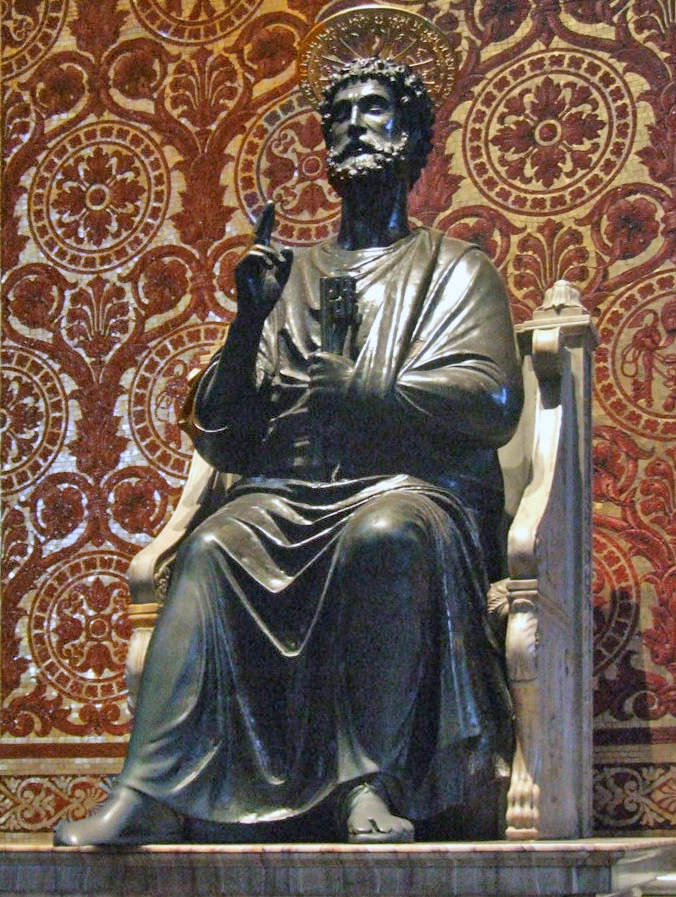
The bronze statue of Saint Peter holding the keys of heaven, attributed to Arnolfo di Cambio

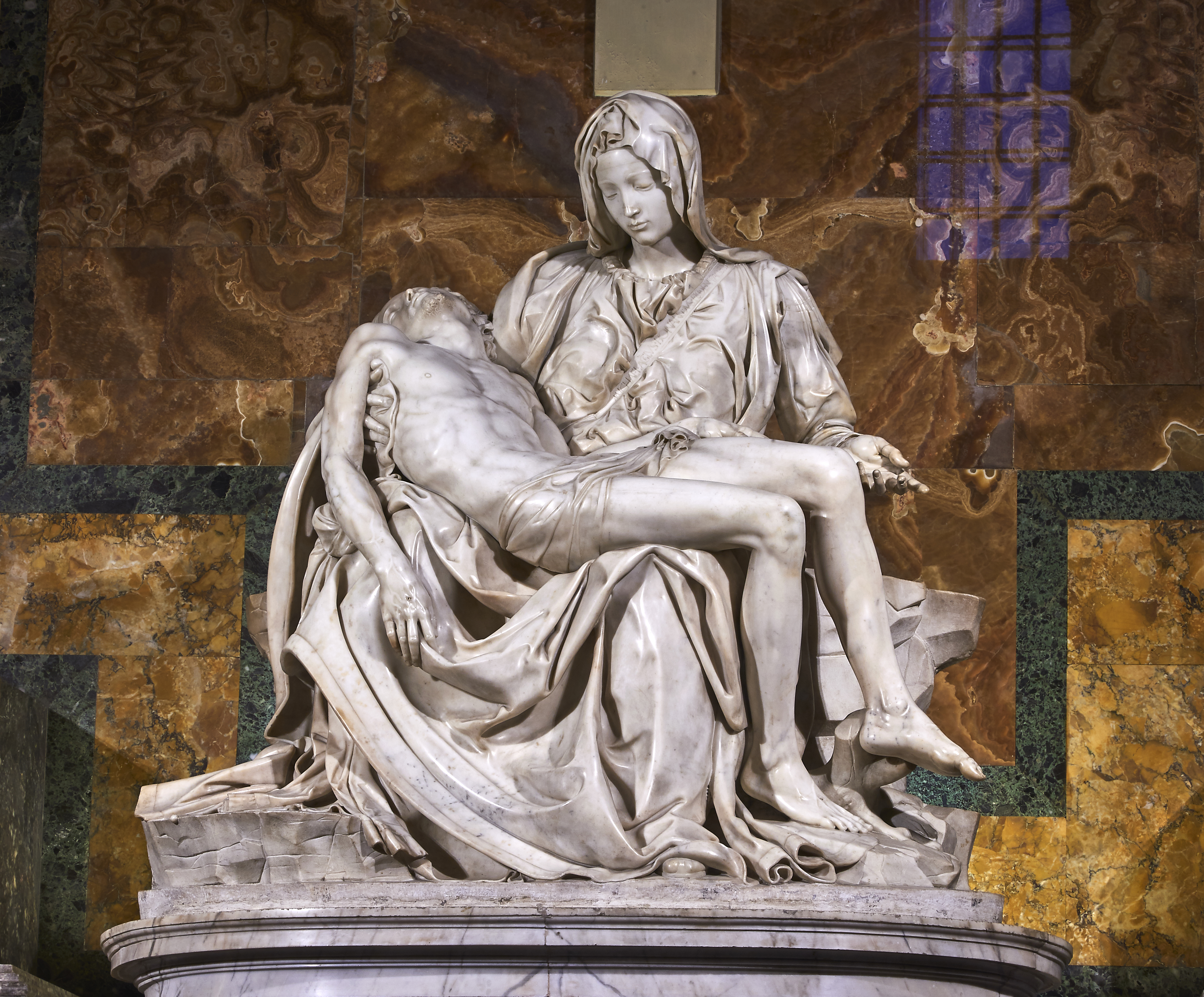
The Pietà by Michelangelo, 1498–1499, is in the north aisle.

== Archpriests since 1053 ==
Cardinals at Mass in Saint Peter's Basilica two days before a papal conclave, 16 April 2005

List of archpriests of the Vatican Basilica:

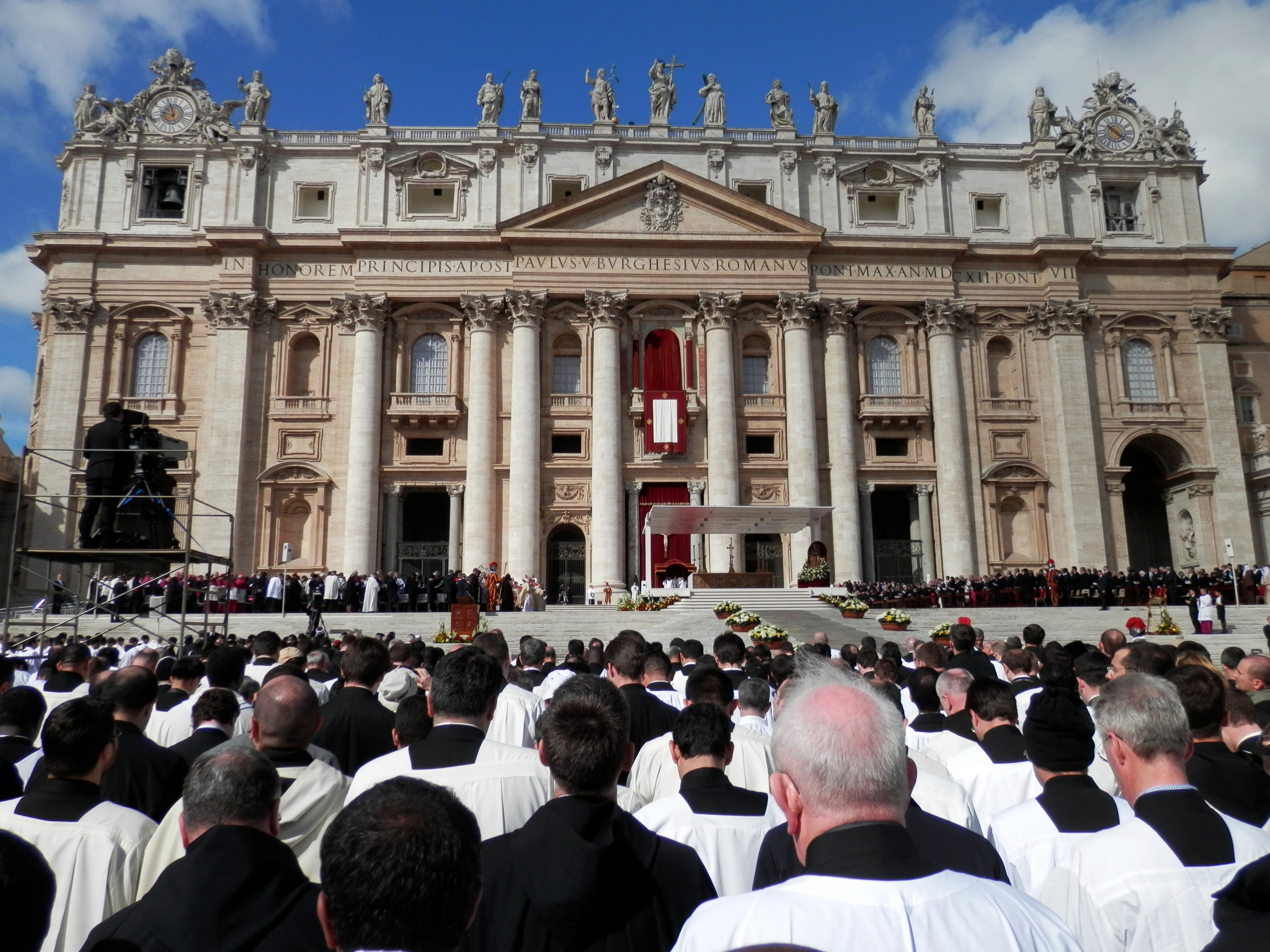
The inauguration of Pope Francis in 2013

- Giovanni (1053)
- Deusdedit (1092)
- Azzo (1103–1104)
- Rustico de' Rustici (c. 1128 – c. 1131)
- Griffone (1138–1139)
- Pietro (c. 1140?–1144)
- Bernard (1145?–1176?)
- Giovanni da Sutri (1176/78–1180)
- Ugolino di Segni (c. 1191 – c. 1200–1206)
- Guido Pierleoni (1206/7–1228)
- Stefano Conti (1229–1254)
- Riccardo Annibaldi (1254–1276)
- Giovanni Gaetano Orsini (1276–1277)
- Matteo Rosso Orsini (1278–1305)
- Napoleone Orsini Frangipani (1306–1342)
- Annibaldo di Ceccano (1342–1350)
- Guillaume de La Jugie (1362–1365)
- Rinaldo Orsini (1366–1374)
- Hugues de Saint-Martial (1374–1378)
- Philippe d'Alençon (1378–1397)
- Cristoforo Maroni (1397–1404)
- Angelo Acciaioli (1404–1408)
- Antonio Calvi (1408–1411)
- Pedro Fernandez de Frias (1412–1420)
- Antonio Correr (1420–1429)
- Lucido Conti (1429–1434)
- Giordano Orsini (1434–1438)
- Giuliano Cesarini (1439–1444)
- Pietro Barbo (1445–1464)
- Richard Olivier (1464–1470)
- Giovanni Battista Zeno (1470–1501)
- Juan López (1501)
- Ippolito d'Este (1501–1520)
- Marco Cornaro (1520)
- Franciotto Orsini (1520–1530)
- Francesco Cornaro (1530–1543)
- Alessandro Farnese (1543–1589)
- Giovanni Evangelista Palotta (1589–1620)
- Scipione Caffarelli-Borghese (1620–1633)
- Francesco Barberini (1633–1667)
- Carlo Barberini (1667–1704)
- Francesco Nerli (iuniore) (1704–1708)
- Annibale Albani (1712–1751)
- Henry Benedict Stuart (1751–1807)
- Romualdo Braschi-Onesti (1807–1817)
- Alessandro Mattei (1817–1820)
- Pietro Francesco Galleffi (6 May 1820 – 18 June 1837)
- Giacomo Giustiniani (1 July 1837 – 24 February 1843)
- Mario Mattei (11 March 1843 – 7 October 1870)
- Niccola Paracciani Clarelli (8 October 1870 – 7 July 1872)
- Edoardo Borromeo (10 July 1872 – 30 November 1881)
- Edward Henry Howard (12 December 1881 – 16 September 1892)
- Francesco Ricci Paracciani (6 October 1892 – 9 March 1894)
- Mariano Rampolla del Tindaro (21 March 1894 – 16 December 1913)
- Rafael Merry del Val (12 January 1914 – 26 February 1930)
- Eugenio Pacelli (25 March 1930 – 2 March 1939)
- Federico Tedeschini (14 March 1939 – 2 November 1959)
- Domenico Tardini (14 November 1959 – 30 July 1961)
- Paolo Marella (14 August 1961 – 8 February 1983)
- Aurelio Sabattani (8 February 1983 – 1 July 1991)
- Virgilio Noè (1 July 1991 – 24 April 2002)
- Francesco Marchisano (24 April 2002 – 31 October 2006)
- Angelo Comastri (31 October 2006 – 20 February 2021)
  - Comastri was named Coadjutor Archpriest on 5 February 2005
- Mauro Gambetti (20 February 2021 – 3 October 2026)
- Vittorio Francesco Viola (from 10 October 2026)

== Specifications ==
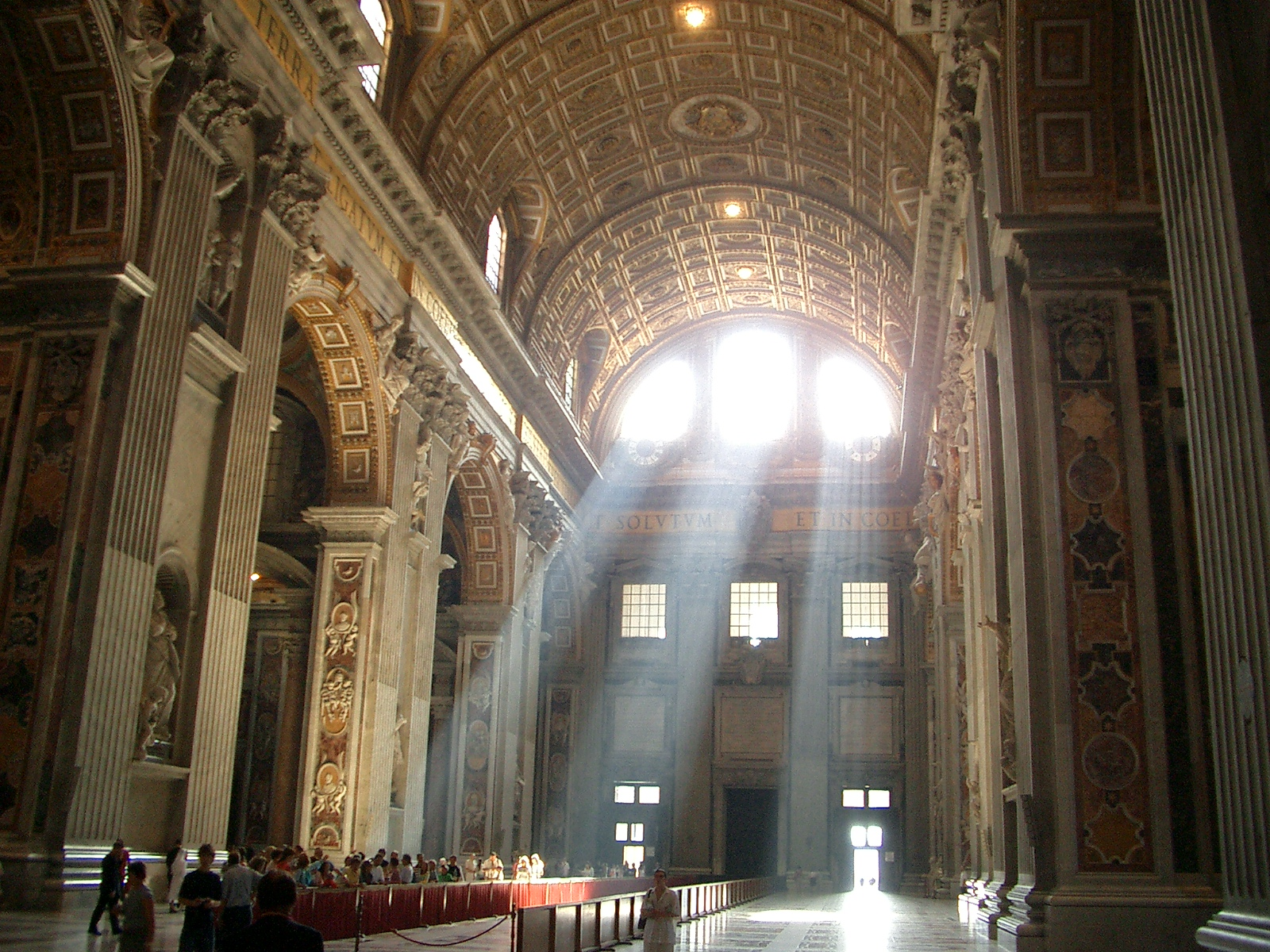
Crepuscular rays are seen in St. Peter's Basilica at certain times each day.

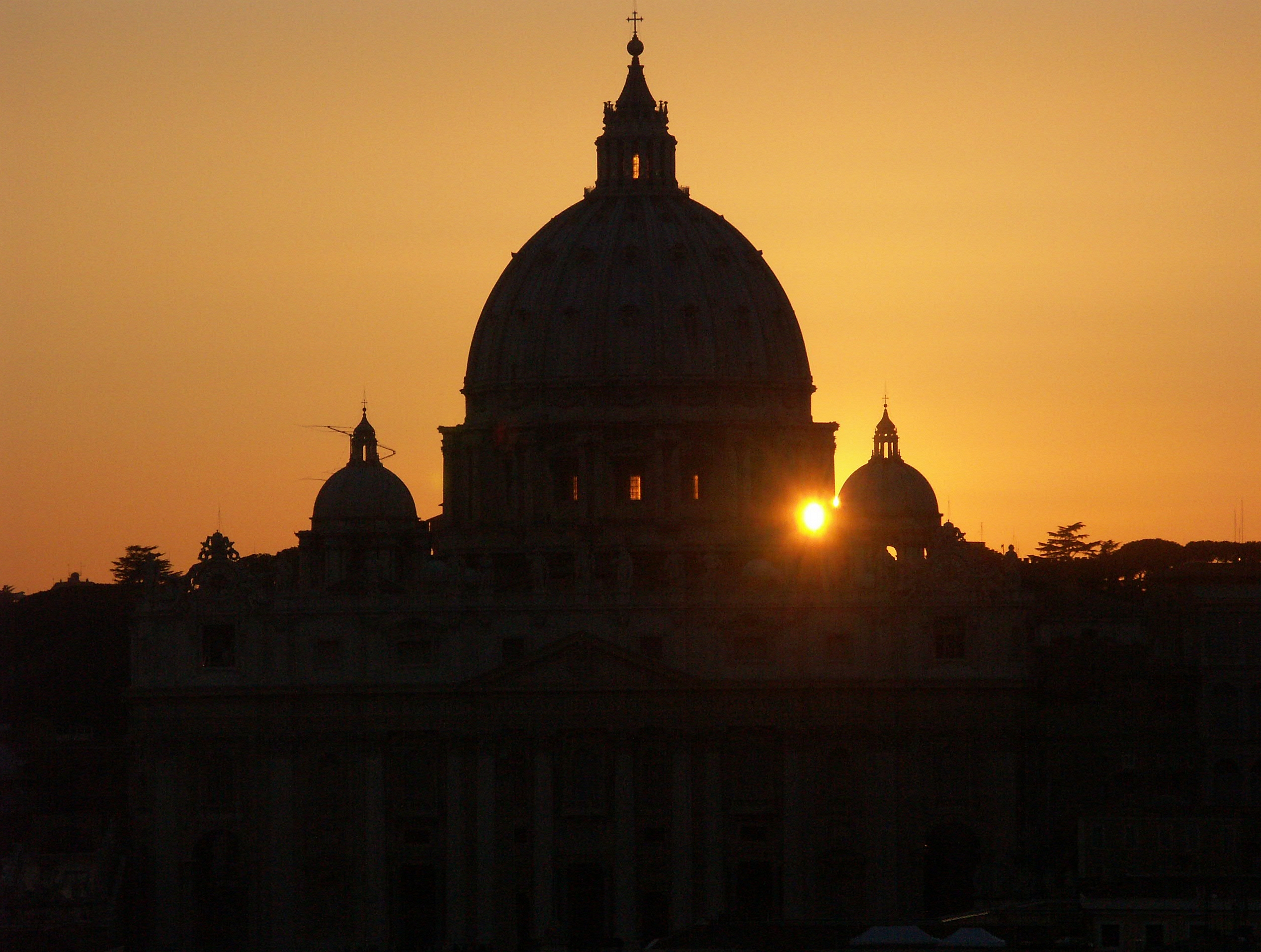
Silhouette of St. Peter's Basilica at sundown (view from Castel Sant'Angelo).

- Cost of construction of the basilica: more than 46,800,052 ducats
- Geographic orientation: chancel west, nave east
- Total length: 730 feet (220 m)
- Total width: 500 feet (150 m)
- Interior length including vestibule: 693.8 feet (211.5 m), more than 1/8 mile.
- Length of the transepts in interior: 451 feet (137 m)
- Width of nave: 90.2 feet (27.5 m)
- Width at the tribune: 78.7 feet (24.0 m)
- Internal width at transepts: 451 feet (137 m)
- Internal height of nave: 151.5 feet (46.2 m) high
- Total area: 227,070 square feet (21,095 m^{2}), more than 5 acres (20,000 m^{2}).
- Internal area: 163,182.2 square feet (3.75 acres; 15,160.12 m^{2})
- Height from pavement to top of cross: 448.1 feet (136.6 m)
- Façade: 167 feet (51 m) high by 375 feet (114 m) wide
- Vestibule: 232.9 feet (71.0 m) wide, 44.2 feet (13.5 m) deep, and 91.8 feet (28.0 m) high
- The internal columns and pilasters: 92 feet (28 m) tall
- The circumference of the central piers: 240 feet (73 m)
- Outer diameter of dome: 137.7 feet (42.0 m)
- The drum of the dome: 630 feet (190 m) in circumference and 65.6 feet (20.0 m) high, rising to 240 feet (73 m) from the ground
- The lantern: 63 feet (19 m) high
- The ball and cross: 8 and 16 feet (2.4 and 4.9 m), respectively
- St. Peter's Square: 1,115 feet (340 m) long, 787.3 feet (240.0 m) wide
- Each arm of the colonnade: 306 feet (93 m) long, and 64 feet (20 m) high
- The colonnades have 284 columns, 88 pilasters, and 140 statues
- Obelisk: 83.6 feet (25.5 m). Total height with base and cross, 132 feet (40 m).
- Weight of obelisk: 360.2 short tons (326,800 kg; 720,400 lb)

== See also ==
- 16th-century Western domes
- Architecture of cathedrals and great churches
- Architecture of Rome
- Index of Vatican City-related articles
- List of basilicas in Italy
- List of oldest church buildings
- List of Roman Catholic basilicas
- List of tallest buildings in Rome
- List of tallest domes
- List of tallest structures built before the 20th century
- List of tourist attractions in Rome
- Symbolism of domes

== Bibliography ==
- Bannister, Turpin (1968). "The Constantinian Basilica of Saint Peter at Rome". Journal of the Society of Architectural Historians. 27 (1): 3–32. doi:10.2307/988425. JSTOR 988425. OCLC 19640446.(subscription required)
- Baumgarten, Paul Maria (1913). "Basilica of St. Peter" . In Herbermann, Charles (ed.). Catholic Encyclopedia. New York: Robert Appleton Company.
- Betts, Richard J. (1993). "Structural Innovation and Structural Design in Renaissance Architecture". Journal of the Society of Architectural Historians. 52 (1): 5–25. doi:10.2307/990755. JSTOR 990755.
- Boorsch, Suzanne (1982). "The Building of the Vatican: The Papacy and Architecture". The Metropolitan Museum of Art Bulletin. XL (3). New York: 4–64. doi:10.2307/3258914. JSTOR 3258914. OCLC 39642638.
- Dzyubanskyy, Taras (2010). The Development of the Cult of St. Peter in the Vatican: from the poor man's grave to the largest basilica in the world. Lviv: Artos. ISBN 9789662154535.
- Finch, Margaret (1991). "The Cantharus and Pigna at Old Saint Peter's". Gesta. 30 (1): 16–26. doi:10.2307/767006. JSTOR 767006. S2CID 155861160.(subscription required)
- Fletcher, Banister F. (1921) [1896]. History of Architecture on the Comparative Method for the Student, Craftsman, and Amateur (6th, enlarged ed.). London: Batsford. Archived from the original on 1 January 2024.
- Frommel, Christoph (1986). "Papal Policy: The Planning of Rome during the Renaissance in The Evidence of Art: Images and Meaning in History" (PDF). Journal of Interdisciplinary History. 17 (1). Cambridge: 39–65. doi:10.2307/204124. ISSN 0022-1953. JSTOR 204124. Archived (PDF) from the original on 27 July 2020.(subscription required)
- Gardner, Helen; Kleiner, Fred S.; Mamiya, Christin J. (2005). Gardner's Art through the Ages: The Western Perspective. Vol. 2 (12th ed.). Belmont: Wadsworth. pp. 499–500, 571–575. ISBN 978-0-495-00479-0.
- Goldscheider, Ludwig (1996). Michelangelo (6th ed.). Oxford: Phaidon. ISBN 978-0-7148-3296-8.
- Hartt, Frederick (2006). History of Italian Renaissance Art (6th ed.). Englewood Cliffs: Prentice Hall. ISBN 978-0-13-188247-8.
- Hintzen-Bohlen, Brigitte; Sorges, Jürgen (2001). Rome and the Vatican City. Köln: Könemann. ISBN 978-3-8290-3109-7.
- Korn, Frank J. (2002). Hidden Rome. New York: Paulist Press. ISBN 978-0-8091-4109-8.
- Lanciani, Rodolfo (1892). "Chapter III: Christian Churches". Pagan and Christian Rome. Boston and New York: Houghton, Mifflin and Company. Archived from the original on 26 August 2021.
- Lees-Milne, James (1967). Saint Peter's – the story of Saint Peter's Basilica in Rome. London: Hamish Hamilton. OCLC 1393052. Archived from the original on 20 April 2015.
- McClendon, Charles (1989). "The History of the Site of St. Peter's Basilica, Rome". Perspecta: The Yale Architectural Journal. 25: 32–65. doi:10.2307/1567138. ISSN 0079-0958. JSTOR 1567138.
- Pevsner, Nikolaus (1963). An Outline of European Architecture (7th ed.). Baltimore: Penguin Books. OCLC 2208913. Reprint: ISBN 978-0-14-020109-3.
- Pile, John F. (2005). A History of Interior Design (second ed.). London: Laurence King Publishing. ISBN 978-1-856-69418-6. Archived from the original on 22 February 2024.
- Pinto, Pio (1975). The Pilgrim's Guide to Rome. San Francisco: Harper & Row. ISBN 978-0-06-013388-7.
- Rasch, Jürgen (1985), "Die Kuppel in der römischen Architektur. Entwicklung, Formgebung, Konstruktion", Architectura, vol. 15, pp. 117–139
- Scotti, R. A. (2007). Basilica: The Splendor and the Scandal – Building of St. Peter's. New York: Plume. ISBN 978-0-452-28860-7.
- "Inside the Vatican". National Geographic News. National Geographic Society. 28 October 2010 [2004]. Archived from the original on 20 November 2001.
- "Saint Peter's – Truth Unveiled: Bernini's Bell Towers and the Allegory of Truth: Urban VIII's Bell Towers". Archived from the original on 10 June 2014.

Records
Unknown	Tallest building in Rome; 1626–2012; 136.6 metres (448 ft)	Succeeded by Torre Eurosky
Unknown	Tallest dome 1626–present 136.6 metres (448 ft)	Current holder
