= 1614 in art =

Events from the year 1614 in art.

== Events ==
- Giovan Battista Crespi begins work on the Sancarlone.

== Works ==
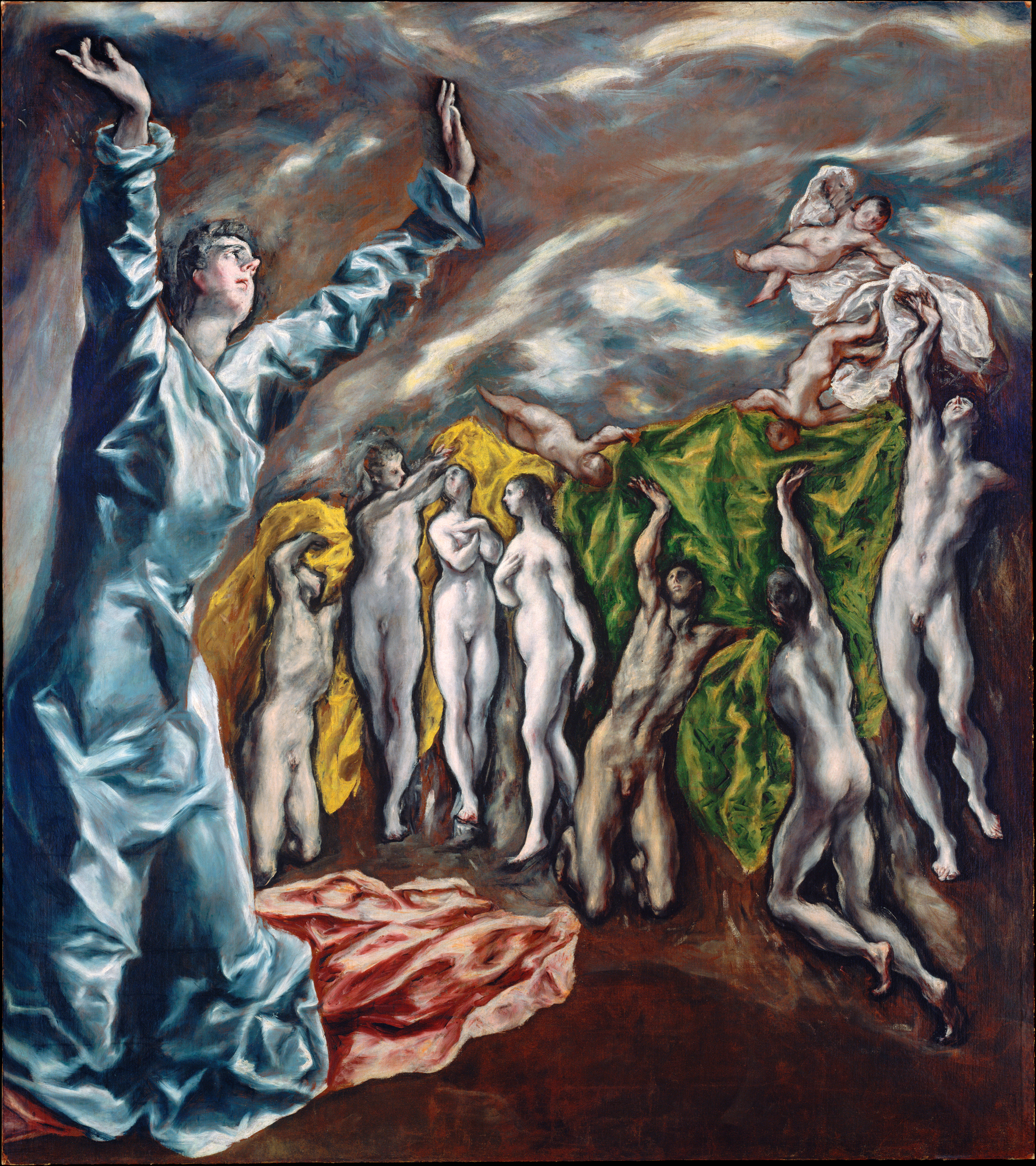
El Greco, The Opening of the Fifth Seal, oil, 225 × 193 cm

- Artemisia Gentileschi - Judith and her Maidservant (1613–14)
- Marcus Gheeraerts the Younger - Tom Durie, Anne of Denmark's fool
- El Greco
  - The Adoration of the Shepherds (1612–14)
  - The Opening of the Fifth Seal (1608–1614)
- Abraham Janssens - Peace and Plenty binding Arrows of War
- Peter Paul Rubens
  - The Descent from the Cross
  - Lamentation of Christ
  - St Sebastian
  - Venus Frigida
- Hendrick Cornelisz Vroom - Skirmish between Amsterdam and English warships, 20 April 1605
- Adam Willaerts - Shipwreck off a Rocky Coast

== Births ==
- March 25 - Juan Carreño de Miranda, Spanish painter (died 1685)
- April 18 - Nicolas Robert, French miniaturist and engraver (died 1685)
- May 12 - Giovanni Bernardo Carboni, Italian historical and portrait painter (died 1683)
- July 23 - Bonaventura Peeters, Flemish Baroque painter (died 1652)
- August 3 - Juan de Arellano, Spanish painter (born 1614)
- date unknown - Jacob van Loo, Dutch painter, founder of the Van Loo family of painters (died 1670)
- probable
  - Pietro Paolo Baldini, Italian painter (died 1684)
  - Thomas Blanchet, French painter, draughtsman, architect, sculptor and printmaker (died 1689)
  - Frederik Bloemaert, Dutch engraver (died 1690)
  - Ambrosio Martínez Bustos, Spanish Baroque painter active in Granada (died 1672)
  - Johannes Mytens, Dutch painter (died 1670)
  - Jan van Aken, Dutch Golden Age painter and engraver (died 1661)

== Deaths ==
- April 7 - El Greco, Spanish painter (born 1541)
- August 11 - Lavinia Fontana, Italian painter (born 1552)
- October 2 - Carlo Sellitto, Italian Caravaggisto (born 1581)
- October 14 - Jacob Bunel, French painter (born 1568)
- date unknown
  - Cesare Arbasia, Italian Mannerist painter
  - Ciriaco Mattei, Italian art collector
  - Konoe Nobutada, Momoyama period Japanese poet, calligrapher, painter and diarist (born 1565)
  - Paulus van Vianen, Dutch medallist and sculptor (born 1570)
- probable - Ambroise Dubois, Flemish painter of the second School of Fontainebleau (born 1542)
