= 1552 in art =

Events from the year 1552 in art.

== Events ==
- date unknown – Spanish sculptor and architect Alonso Berruguete begins work on the hospital of St. John the Baptist in Toledo.

== Paintings ==
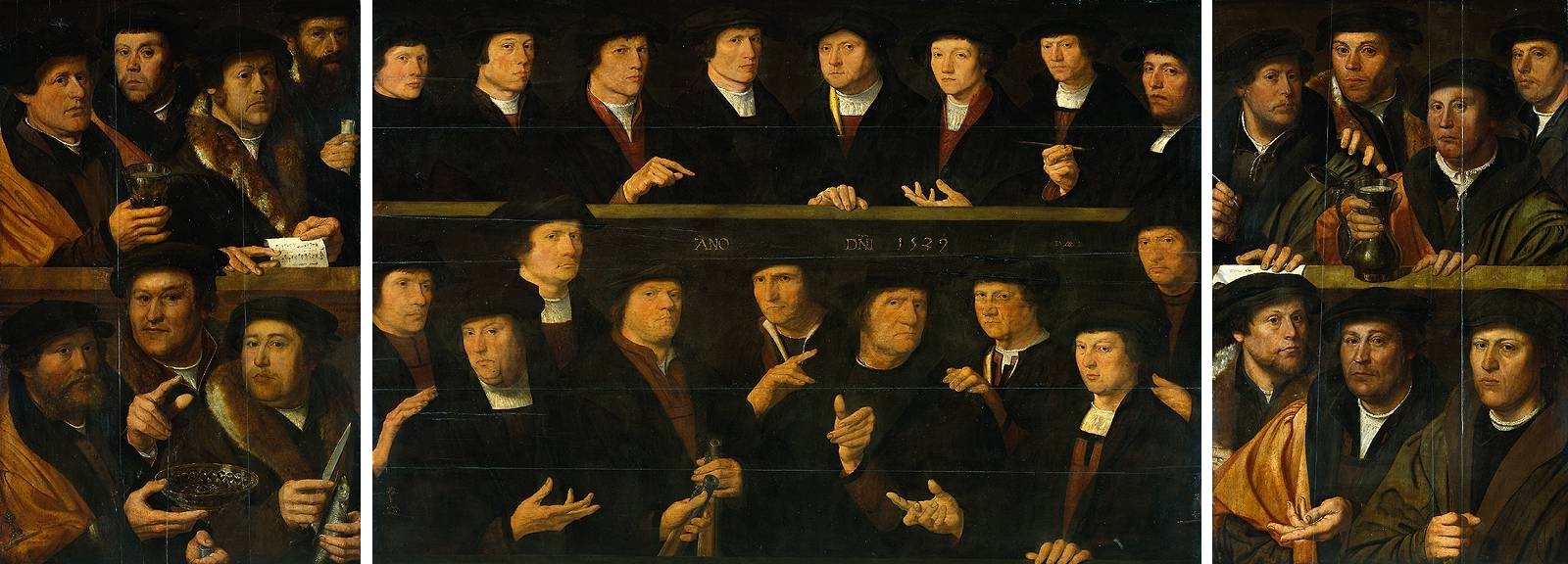
Jacobsz. – A Group of Guardsmen, Rijksmuseum

- Christoph Amberger – Portrait of Sebastian Münster
- Bronzino – Portrait of the Dwarf Nano Morgante
- Dirck Jacobsz. – A Group of Guardsmen
- Hans Mielich – Duke Albrecht V of Bavaria and his wife Anna of Austria playing chess
- Tintoretto – The Vision of St. Peter
- Giorgio Vasari – Allegory of Patience

== Other works ==
- Altarpiece of the Iglesia de San Juan Bautista (Chiclana de la Frontera) by Roque Balduque and Andrés Ramírez
- Pierino da Vinci – Samson Slaying a Philistine (sculpture - ca.)

== Births ==
- August 24 (bapt.) – Lavinia Fontana, Italian painter (died 1614)
- September 21 – Barbara Longhi, Italian painter (died 1638)
- date unknown
  - Hans von Aachen, German Mannerist painter (died 1615)
  - Alessandro Casolano, Italian painter primarily working in Siena (died 1606)
  - Daniël van den Queborn, Dutch Golden Age painter (died 1602)
  - Emanuel Sweert, Dutch painter (died 1612)
- probable
  - Avanzino Nucci, Italian painter (died 1629)
  - Cristoforo Roncalli, Italian painter (died 1626)

== Deaths ==
- July 12 – Niccolò Soggi, Italian painter (born c.1480)
- date unknown
  - Amico Aspertini, early leader of the Bolognese School of painting (born c.1474)
  - Peter Dell the Elder, German sculptor (born 1490)
  - Lucas Cornelisz de Kock, Dutch painter at the Tudor court (born 1495)
  - Giovanni Antonio Lappoli, Italian Mannerist painter (born 1492)
  - Qiu Ying, Chinese painter who specialized in the gongbi brush technique (born 1494)
  - Wilhelm Stetter, German Renaissance painter (born 1487)
