= 1685 in art =

Events from the year 1685 in art.

== Events ==
- (unknown)

== Works ==
=== Paintings ===
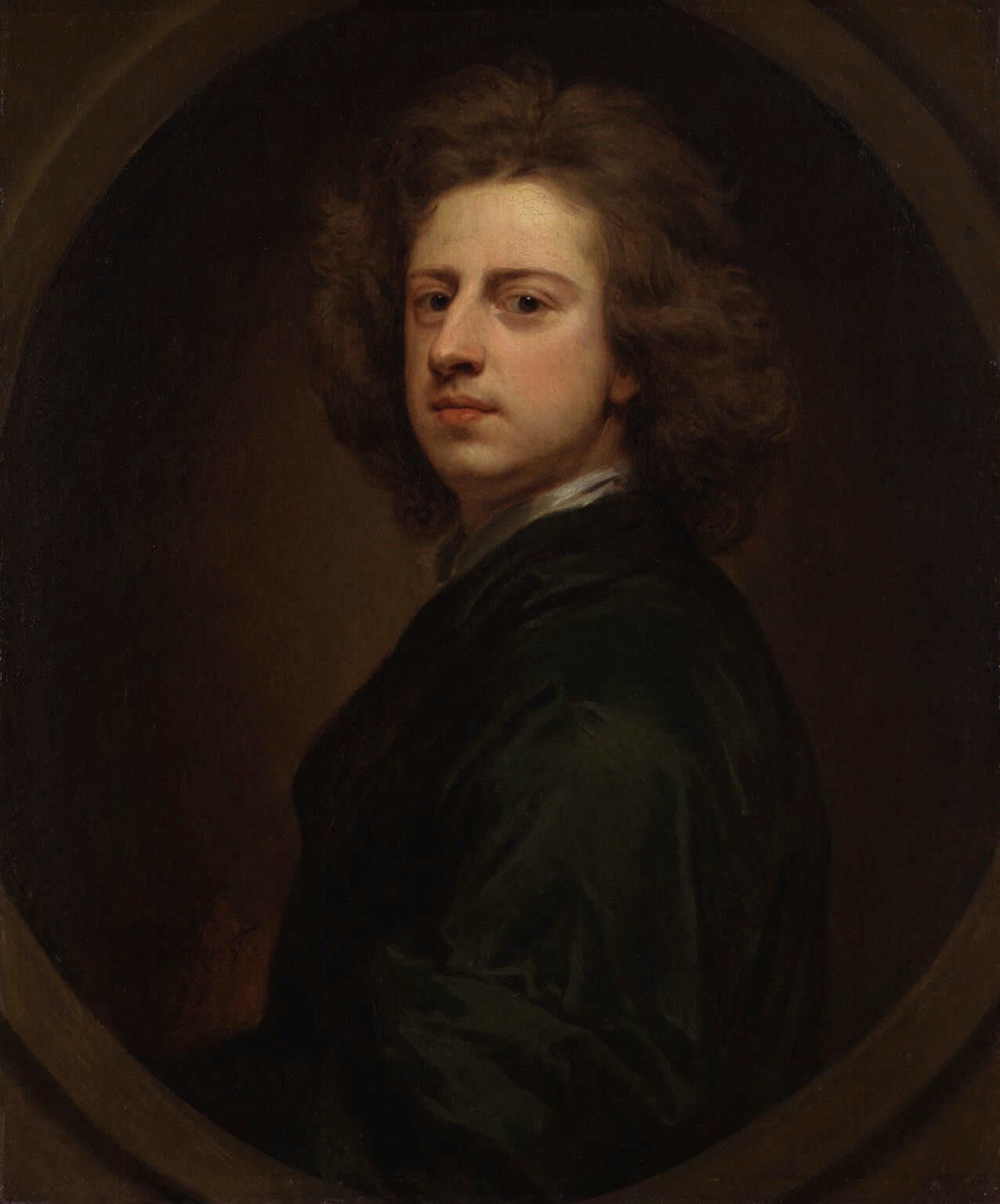
Self-Portrait by Godfrey Kneller.

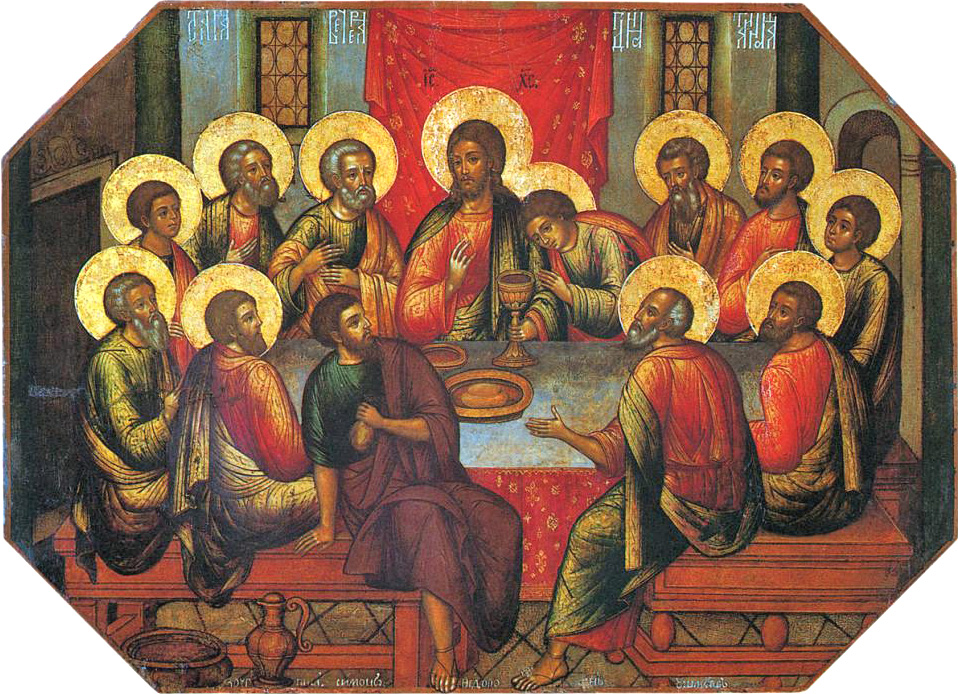
Simon Ushakov – The Last Supper

- Richard Brakenburgh – Feast of St Nicholas
- Claudio Coello – St Dominic of Guzman (approximate date)
- Aert de Gelder – Esther and Mordecai
- Godfrey Kneller – Self-Portrait
- Andrea Pozzo - Dome at Sant'Ignazio
- Simon Ushakov – The Last Supper

=== Sculpture ===
- Pierre Lepautre – Faune au chevreau

== Births ==
- March 17 – Jean-Marc Nattier, French painter (died 1766)
- November 5 - Peter Angelis, French painter (died 1734)
- November 15 – Balthasar Denner, German portrait painter (died 1749)
- date unknown
  - Charles Cressent, French furniture-maker, sculptor and fondeur-ciseleur of the régence style (died 1768)
  - Pietro Paolo Cristofari, Italian artist responsible for a number of the mosaics in St. Peter's Basilica (died 1743)
  - Bernardo Germán de Llórente, Spanish painter of the late-Baroque period (died 1757)
  - Francesco Sleter, Italian painter active in England (died 1775)
  - Jan van Gool, Dutch painter and writer (died 1763)
- probable
  - William Kent, architect and designer (died 1748)
  - Johann Georg Schmidt, Austrian Baroque painter (died 1748)

== Deaths ==
- January – Herman Saftleven, Dutch painter (born 1609)
- March 25 – Nicolas Robert, French miniaturist and engraver (born 1614)
- May – Adriaen van Ostade, Dutch genre painter (born 1610)
- June 16 – Anne Killigrew, English poet and painter (born 1660)
- August 8 – Giovanni Battista Salvi or Sassoferrato, Italian painter (born 1609)
- September – Adam Colonia, Dutch painter working in England (born 1634)
- October 2 – David Teniers III, Flemish painter (born 1638)
- October 3 – Juan Carreño de Miranda, Spanish painter (born 1614)
- date unknown
  - Li Yin, Chinese painter, poet and calligrapher (born c.1610)
  - Giulio Trogli, Italian painter nicknamed il Paradosso ("the Paradox") (born 1613)
  - Jan Baptist van Heil, Flemish painter (born 1604)
