= Jan van Aken (disambiguation) =

Jan van Aken (born 1961) is a German politician.

Jan van Aken may also refer to:

- Jan van Aken (painter) (1614–1661), Dutch painter
- Jan van Aken (writer) (born 1961), Dutch writer
