= Jacob Cornelisz van Oostsanen =

Dutch painter and designer of woodcuts

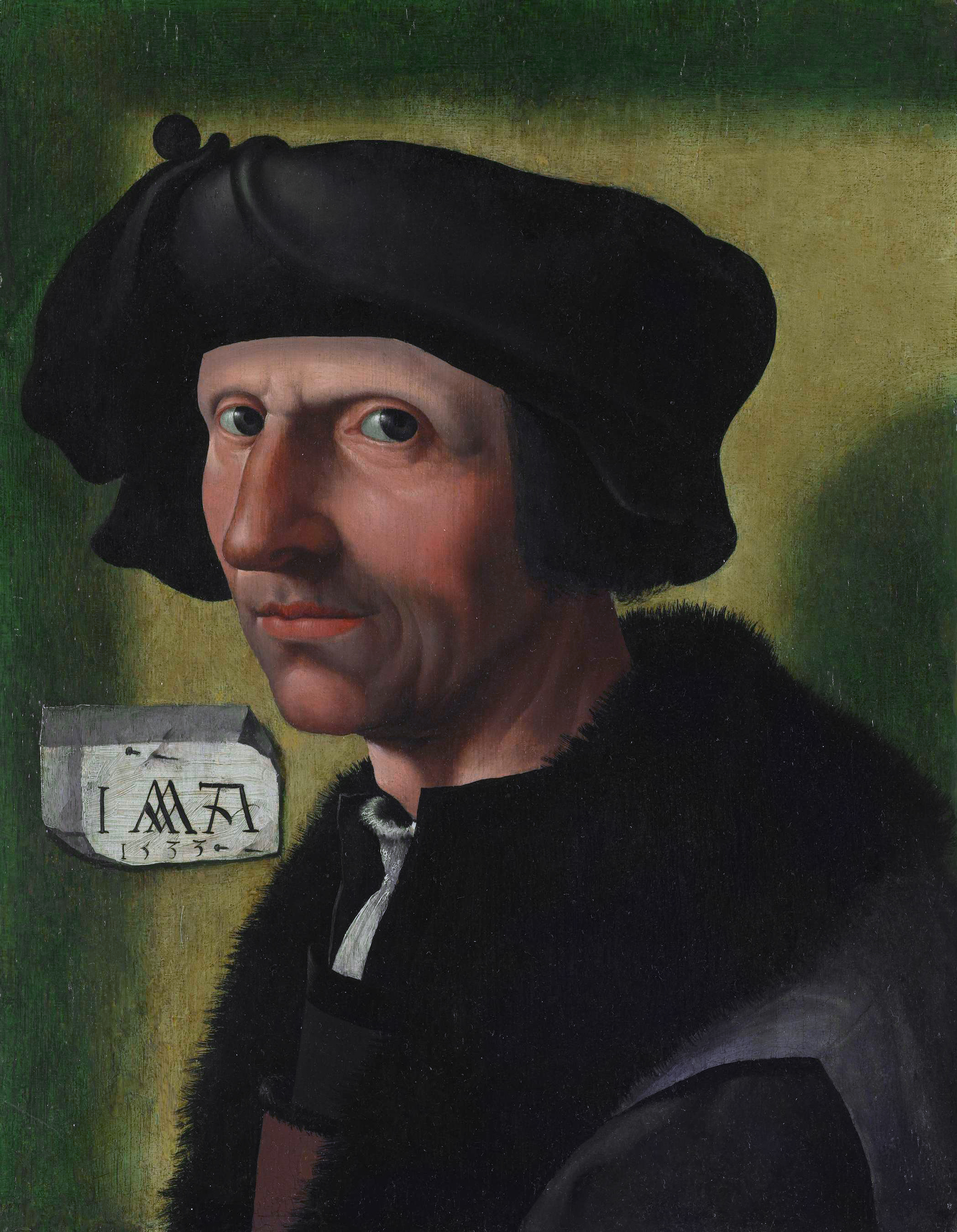
- Jacob Cornelisz. van Oostsanen
- Born: 1472, 1460; Oostzaan
- Died: 18 October 1533 (aged 60–61); Amsterdam
- Occupation: Printmaker, painter, visual artist

Jacob Cornelisz van Oostsanen (before 1470 – 1533) was a Northern Netherlandish designer of woodcuts and painter. He was one of the first important artists working in Amsterdam, at a time when it was a flourishing and beautiful provincial town.

== Biography ==
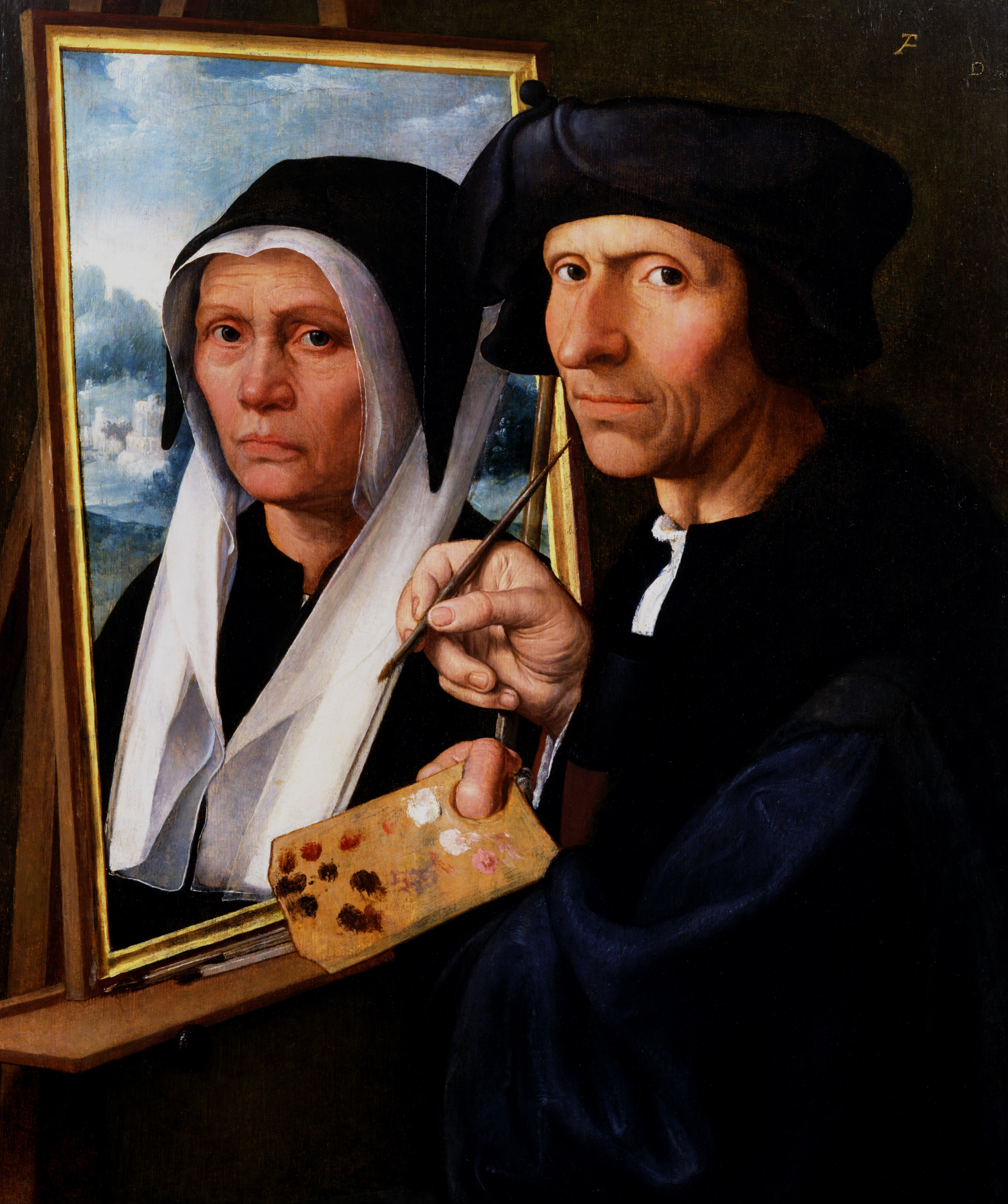
Son Dirck Jacobsz portrayed his parents as Jacob Cornelisz. Painting a Portrait of His Wife Anna

Little is known about Jacob Cornelisz van Oostsanen's life. Historians rely mostly on the biographical sketch of him written by Karel van Mander, the archives of Amsterdam, and the archives of Egmond Abbey, a Benedictine monastery that commissioned works by him. His name indicates he was from Oostzaan, North Holland, east of the river Zaan, northwest of Amsterdam. His family managed land in that area. His entire family were painters. Cornelis Buys I, also known as Master of Alkmaar, was his brother, as was Cornelis Buys II. His sons Cornelis Jacobz and Dirk Jacobsz became portrait painters, as did his grandsons Cornelis Anthonisz and Jacob Dirksz.

As birth or baptism dates have been lost, all of their birth dates have been approximated from other archival evidence such as death dates of other family members. Similar to the archival evidence surrounding Frans Hals, the first known commissions for Jacob Cornelisz were from when he was at least 35 years of age. It is assumed that he worked in a painters's workshop before that, and judging from his close copies of Haarlem painting techniques, this was possibly in Haarlem.

He bought his first house in Amsterdam in 1500, in the Kalverstraat. Twenty years later he bought the neighbouring house. For this reason, he is sometimes called Jacob Cornelisz van Amsterdam. His wife is called a widow in archives for the first time in 1533. The last payments made to him according to the Egmond Abbey archives were in 1526–1528 for a retable (lost during the troubles of the Protestant Reformation).

== Career ==
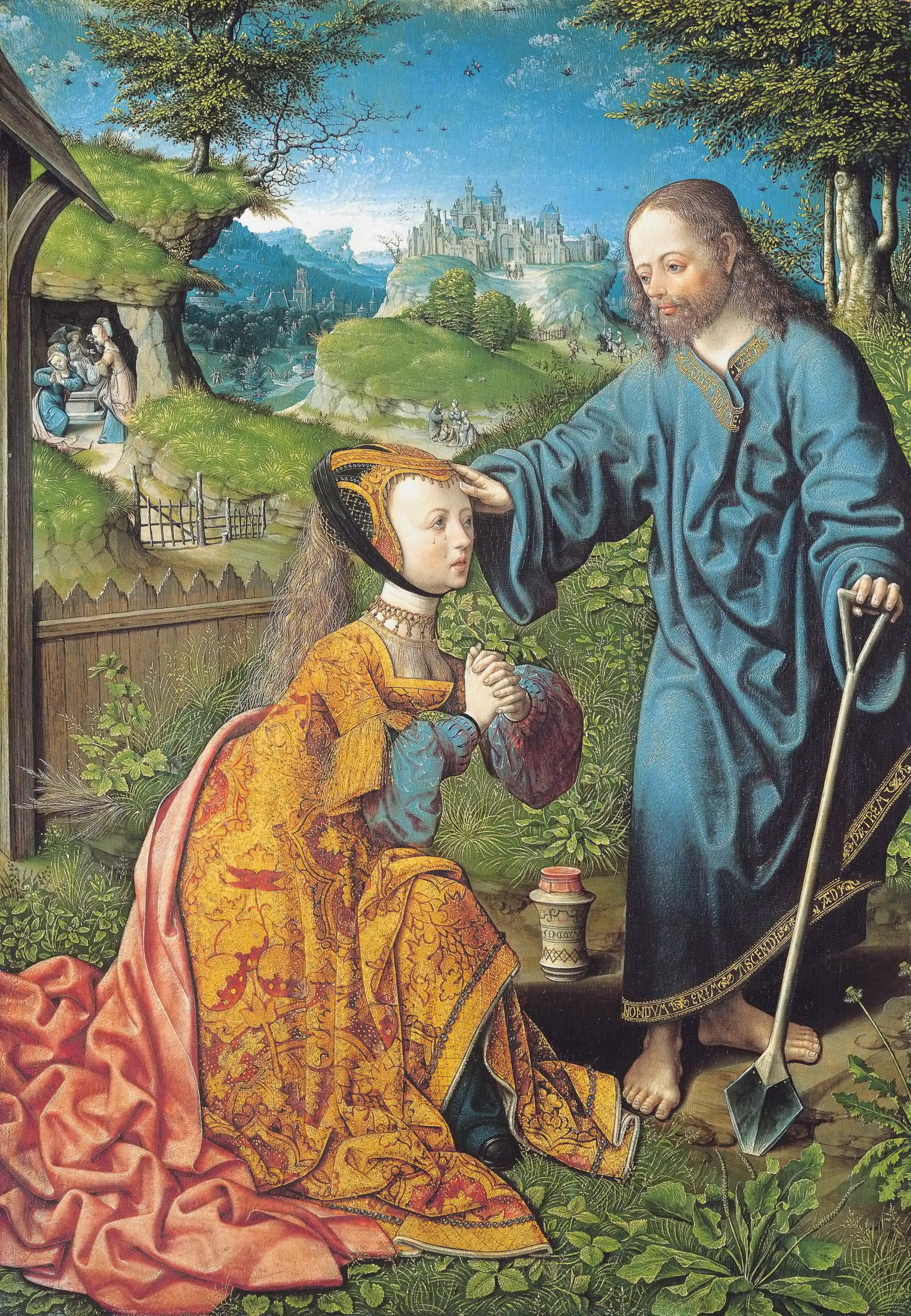
Christ Appearing to Mary Magdalen as a Gardener

In his earlier years, Jacob Cornelisz was under the influence of Haarlem painter Geertgen tot Sint Jans. The colours and techniques suggest that he learned his craft in Haarlem. His later influence then became painter Albrecht Dürer. He may have gone to visit him in Antwerp in the 1520s. The painting patterns of his earlier works suggest he was trained as a woodcut designer or goldsmith. One of his first works was Christ as a gardener.

There are about 200 known woodcuts and 27 paintings by Cornelisz. His prints are traditional north Netherlandish small-scale book illustrations. Writings are used to present the narrative with actions placed in the foreground.

Throughout his artistic career, Cornelisz's painting style changed. At first, he started as a late Gothic craftsman under the influence of the Haarlem school and then ended with a style presented by the painting Saul and the Witch of Endor. In this particular painting, the details are simple, elongated proportions and a looser stroke of paint. Though he excelled as a technical painter, he was not a good leader. He progressed at presenting contemporary trends in subject-matter and style.

Cornelisz's symbolism was also conservative as well. He painted mostly sacred themes with traditional iconography in old and new combinations in response to an event, such as the Reformation. Some of his works such as Christ as the Man of Sorrows (1510) were used by biblical humanists and the Amsterdam oligarchy, who wanted to defend Catholic orthodoxy against the claims of early Reformers. The painting represented Roman Catholic beliefs in an easily understood format. Other paintings such as The Nativity (1512) and Saul and the Witch of Endor were visually similar to what the Catholic essays patrons were writing.

Later in his life, Jacob Cornelisz van Oostsanen ran a workshop with pupils, like his son Dirk Jacobsz and Jan van Scorel did after him. In the workshop, his assistants helped him design book illustrations, woodcuts and stained-glass windows. After 1526 Jacob produced only one known painting, Self Portrait (1533). Scholars were led to believe this was the year of his death, but according to Dutch historian I. H van Eeghen there was a seven-year gap between paintings, which was unusual. She suggested it could have been his son that produced the Self Portrait (1533).

Some regard him as the last of the Flemish painters not to show an Italian influence.

Selected works

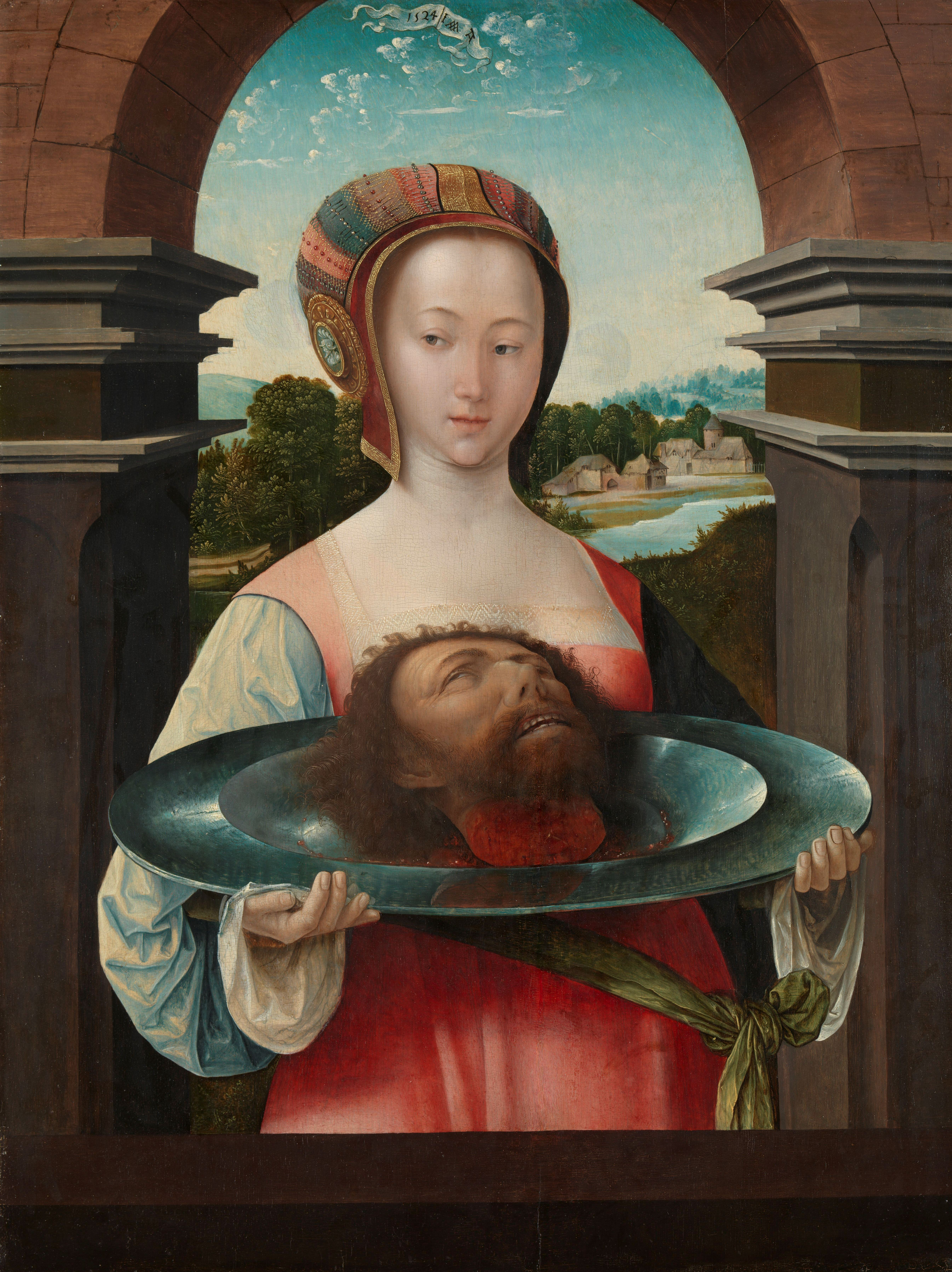
Salome

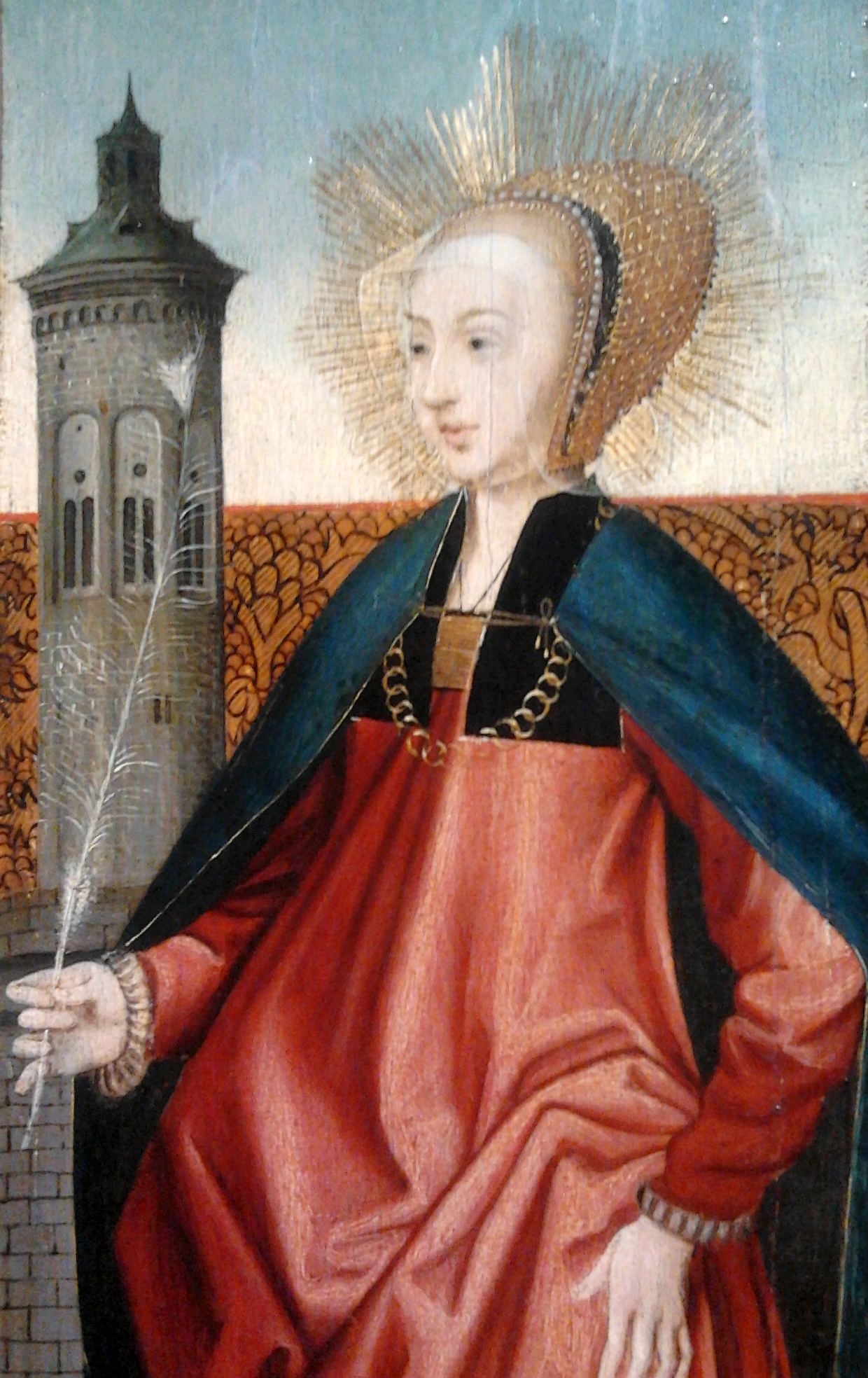
Saint Barbara (detail)

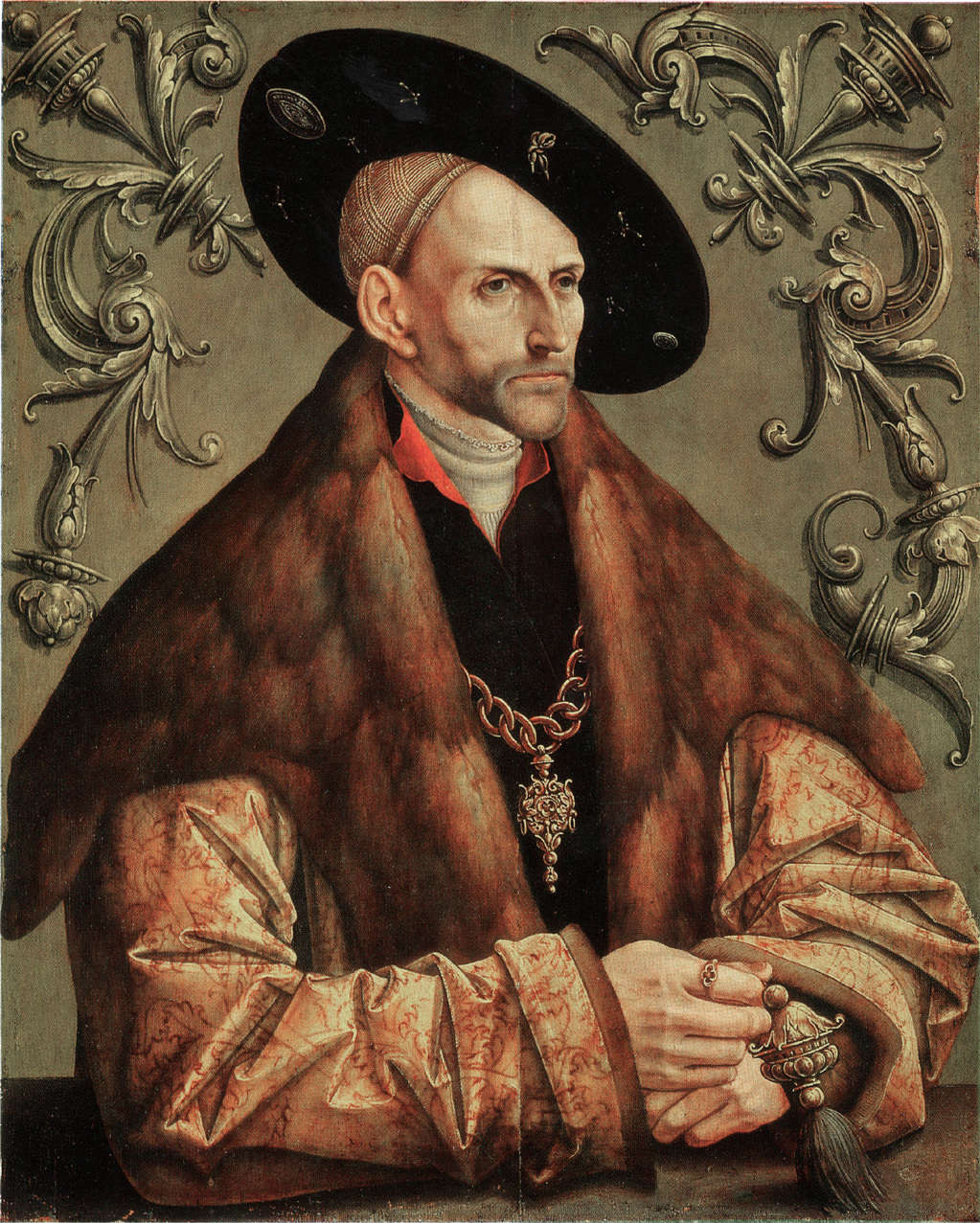
Portrait of Graf Edzard I, Count of Ostfriesland. Landesmuseum Schloss Oldenburg

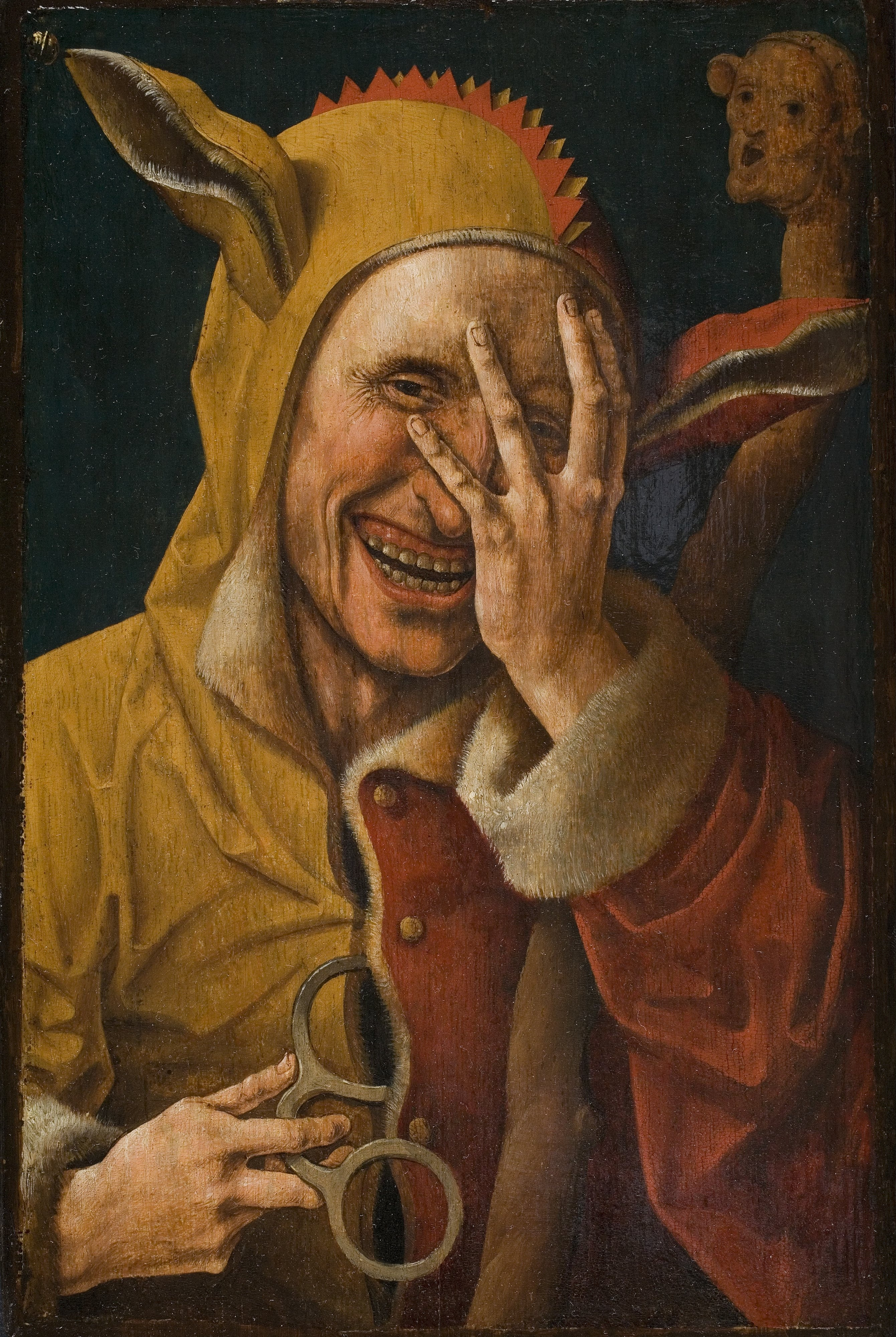
Laughing Fool
Religious paintings

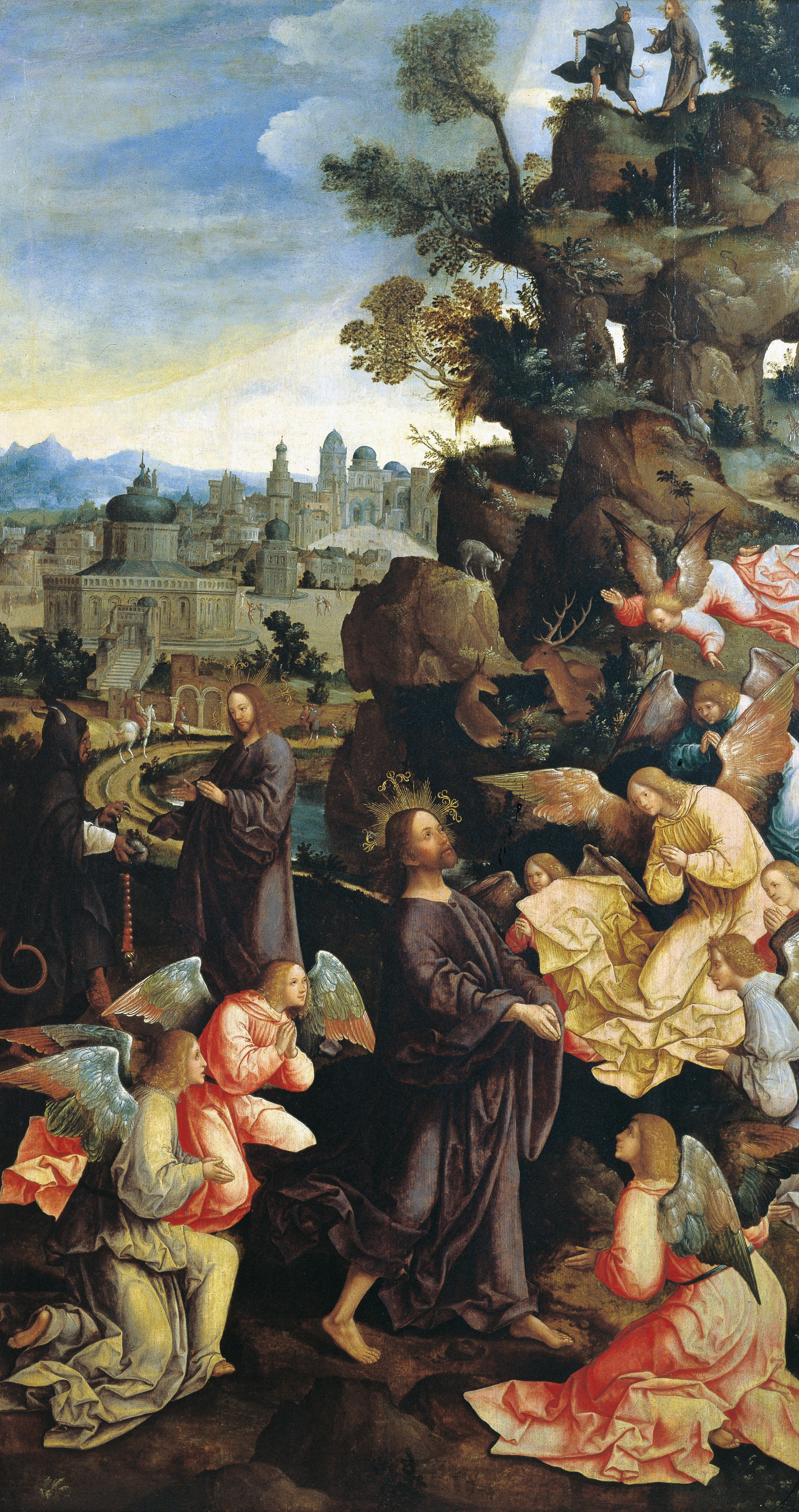
The temptation of Christ

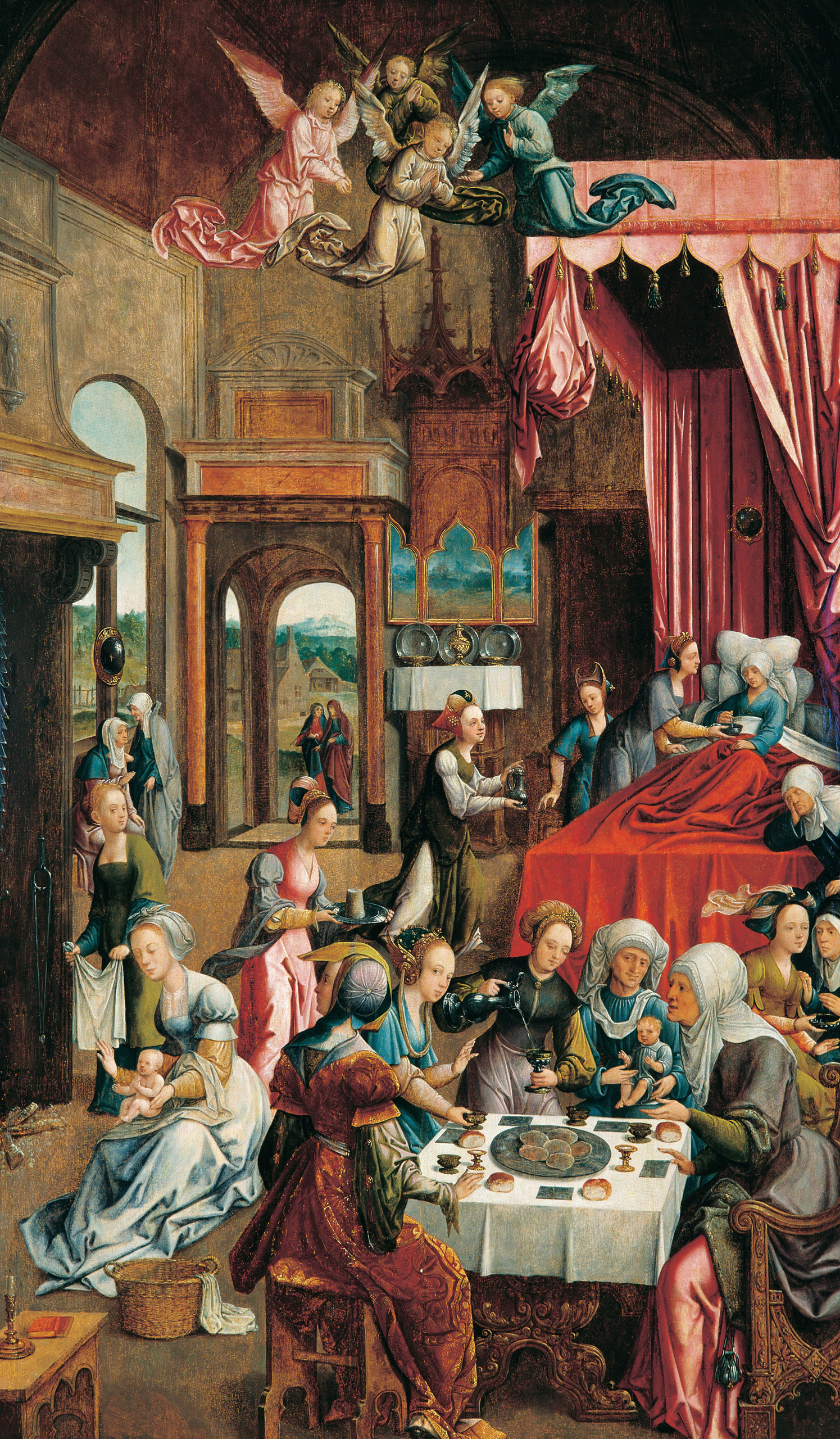
El nacimiento de la Virgen María

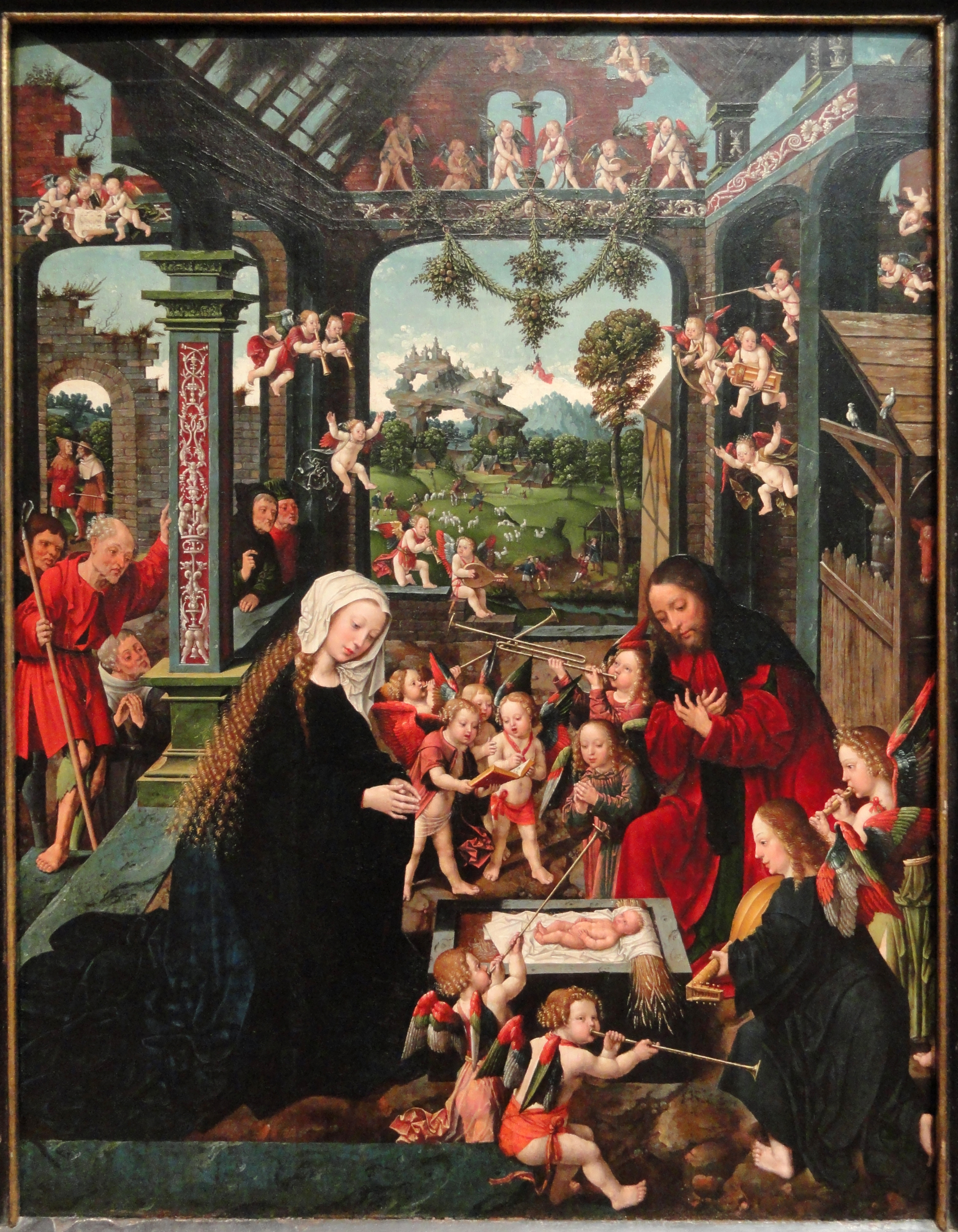
The Adoration of the Christ Child, c. 1515,

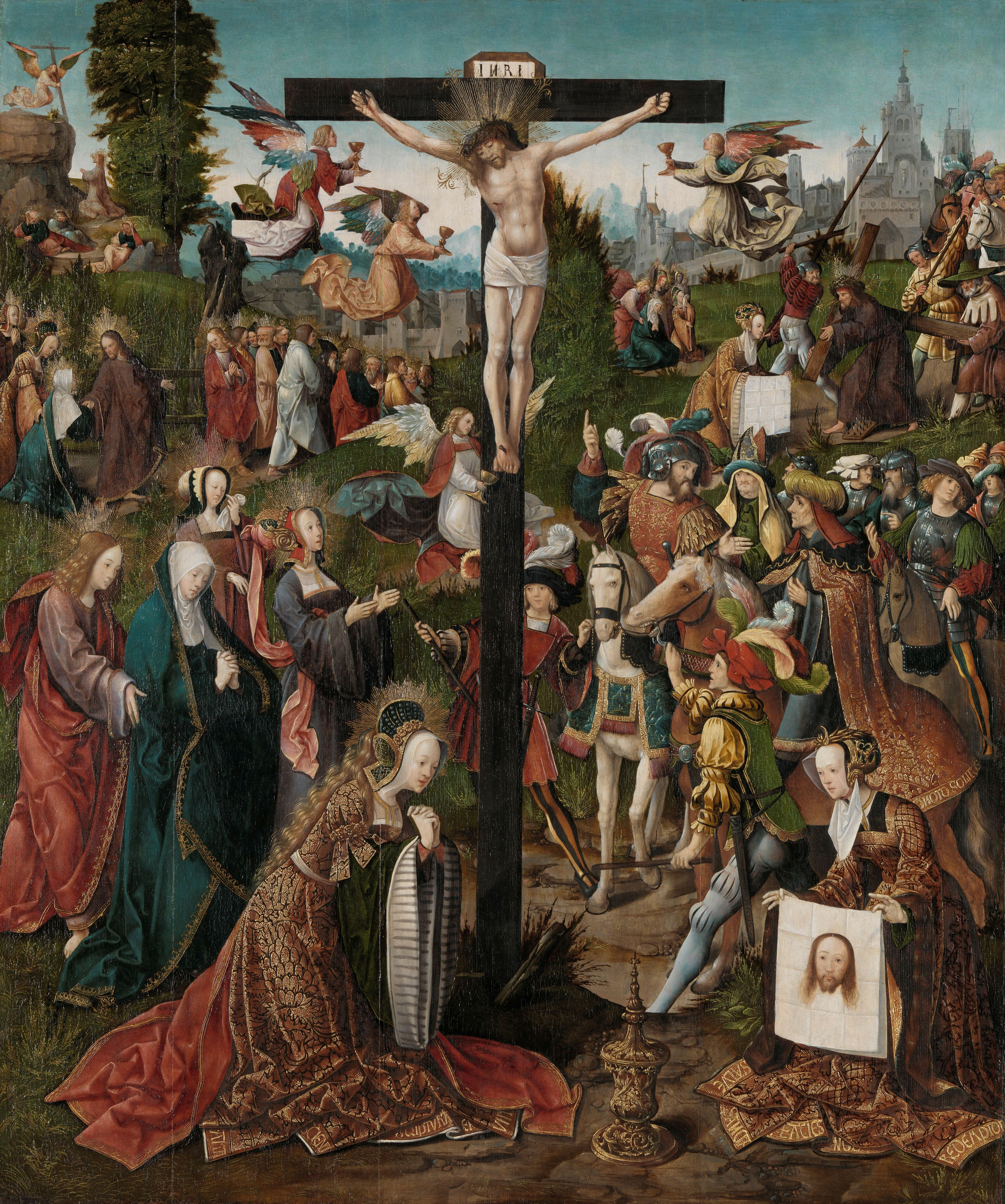
Crucifixion, Rijksmuseum

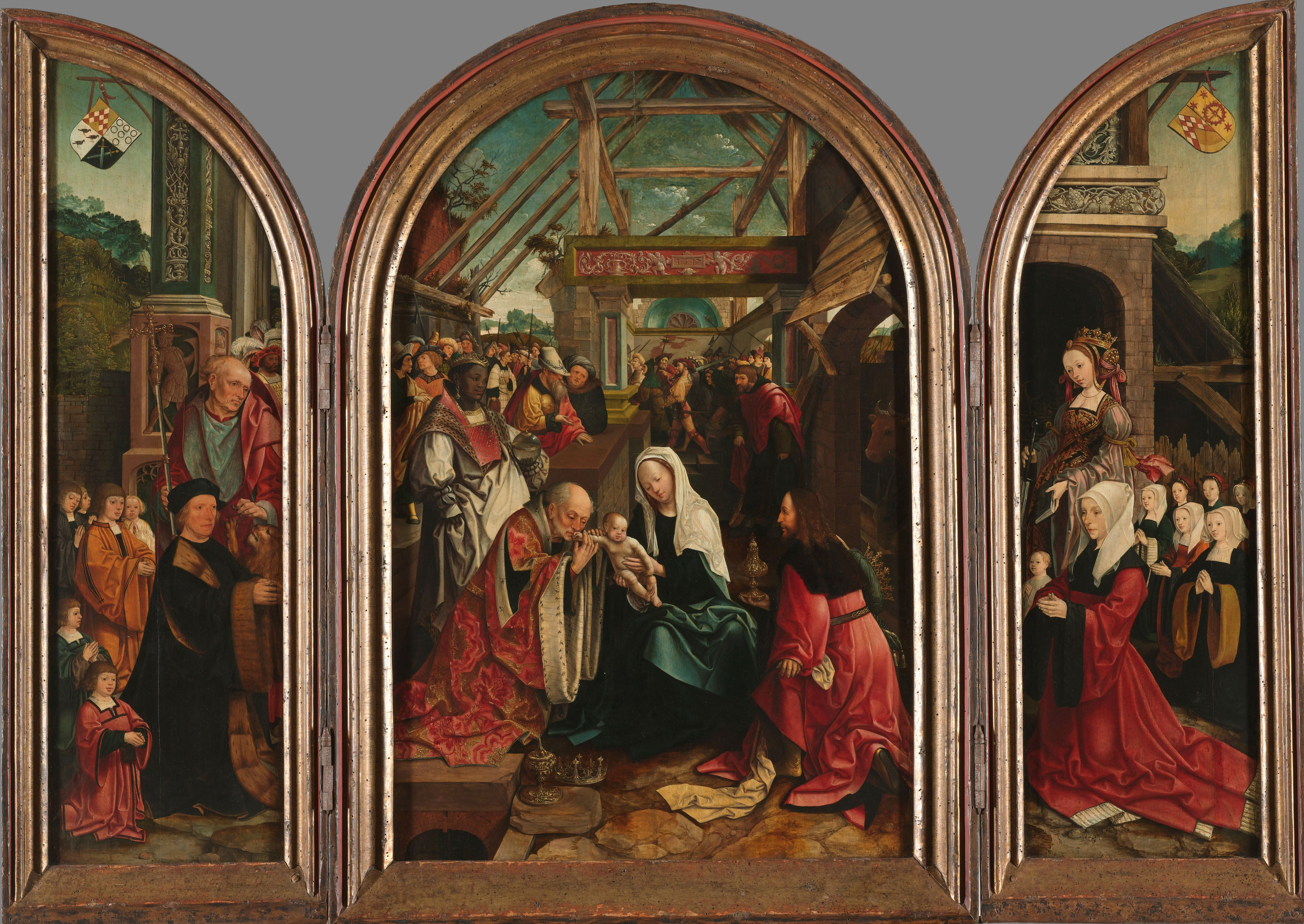
The Adoration of the Magi, 1517, Rijksmuseum

== Sources ==
- Grove Dictionary of Art
- Karel van Mander's Schilder-boeck on the lives of Dutch painters (1604)
