= Adoration of the Magi (Jacob van Oostsanen) =

Painting by Jacob Cornelisz van Oostsanen

The Adoration of the Magi
- De aanbidding van de drie koningen (Dutch)
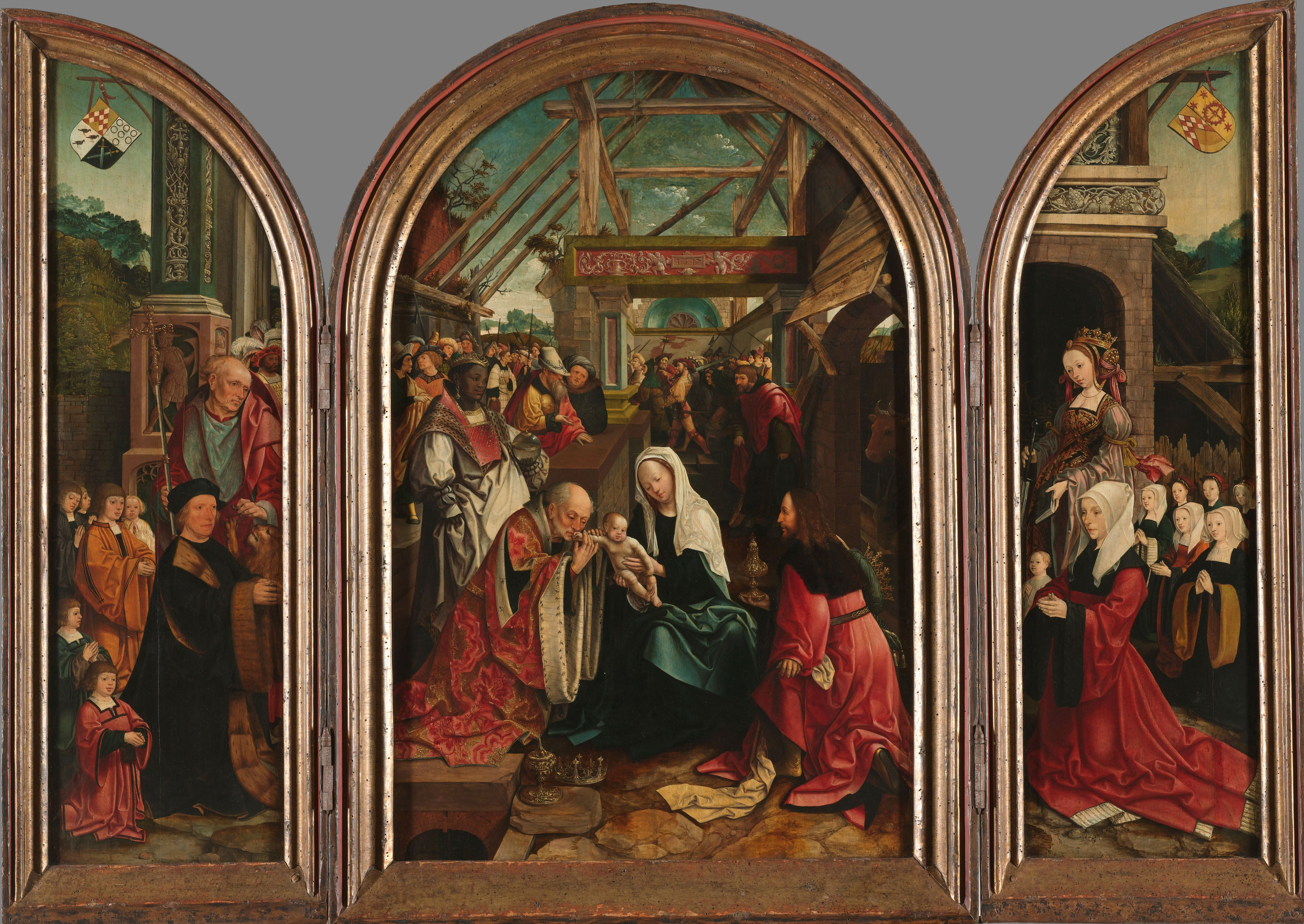
- Artist: Jacob Cornelisz. van Oostsanen
- Year: 1517
- Medium: Oil on panel
- Dimensions: 83 cm × 56 cm (33 in × 22 in)
- Location: Rijksmuseum, Amsterdam

The Adoration of the Magi is a 1517 triptych by the Early Netherlandish painter Jacob Cornelisz. van Oostsanen in the collection of the Rijksmuseum.

== Central panel ==
Mary sits with her child in front of a ruined gateway dated 1517. She holds the Christ Child who leans towards King Melchior to receive a kiss on His hand. Melchior has removed his crown and laid down his gift, a golden covered beaker. On the right King Casper holds his covered beaker of frankincense and on the left King Balthazar holds his gift, an orb of myrrh. Behind him, a line of men holding weapons stretches around the manger. The men are presumably the combined entourages of the Three Kings, who are in conversation with each other and seem oblivious of the scene in the centre.

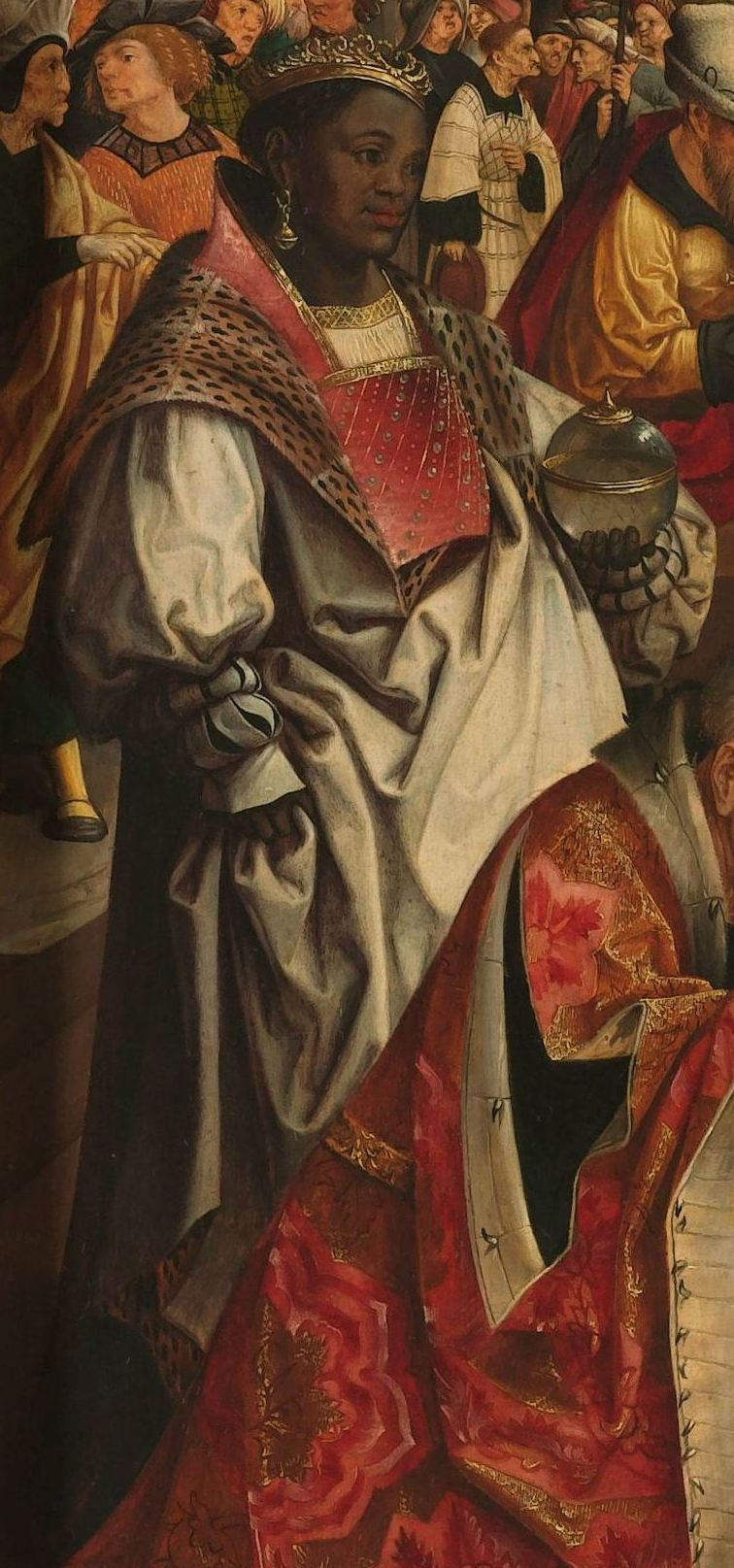
Balthazar with orb

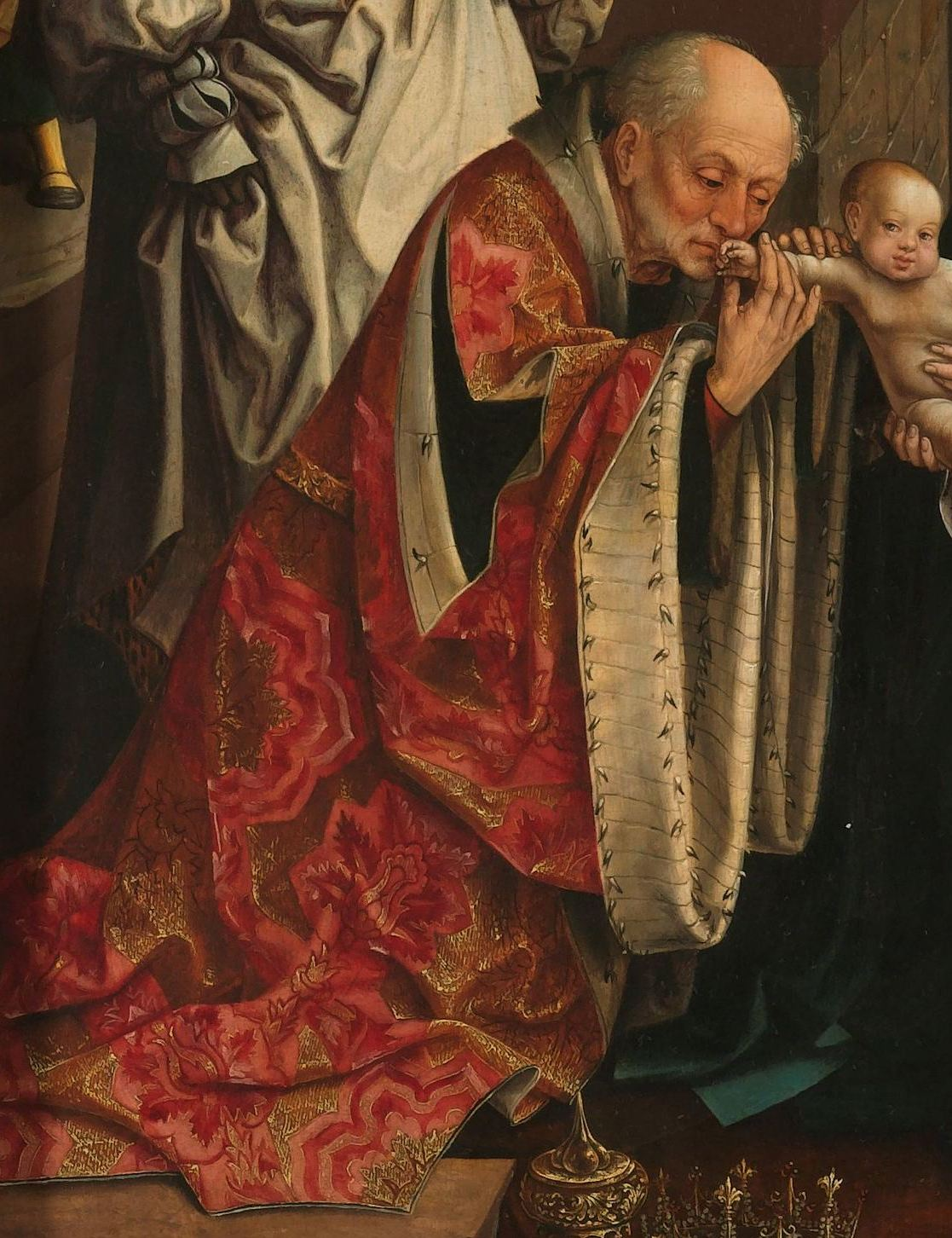
Melchior with gold covered beaker

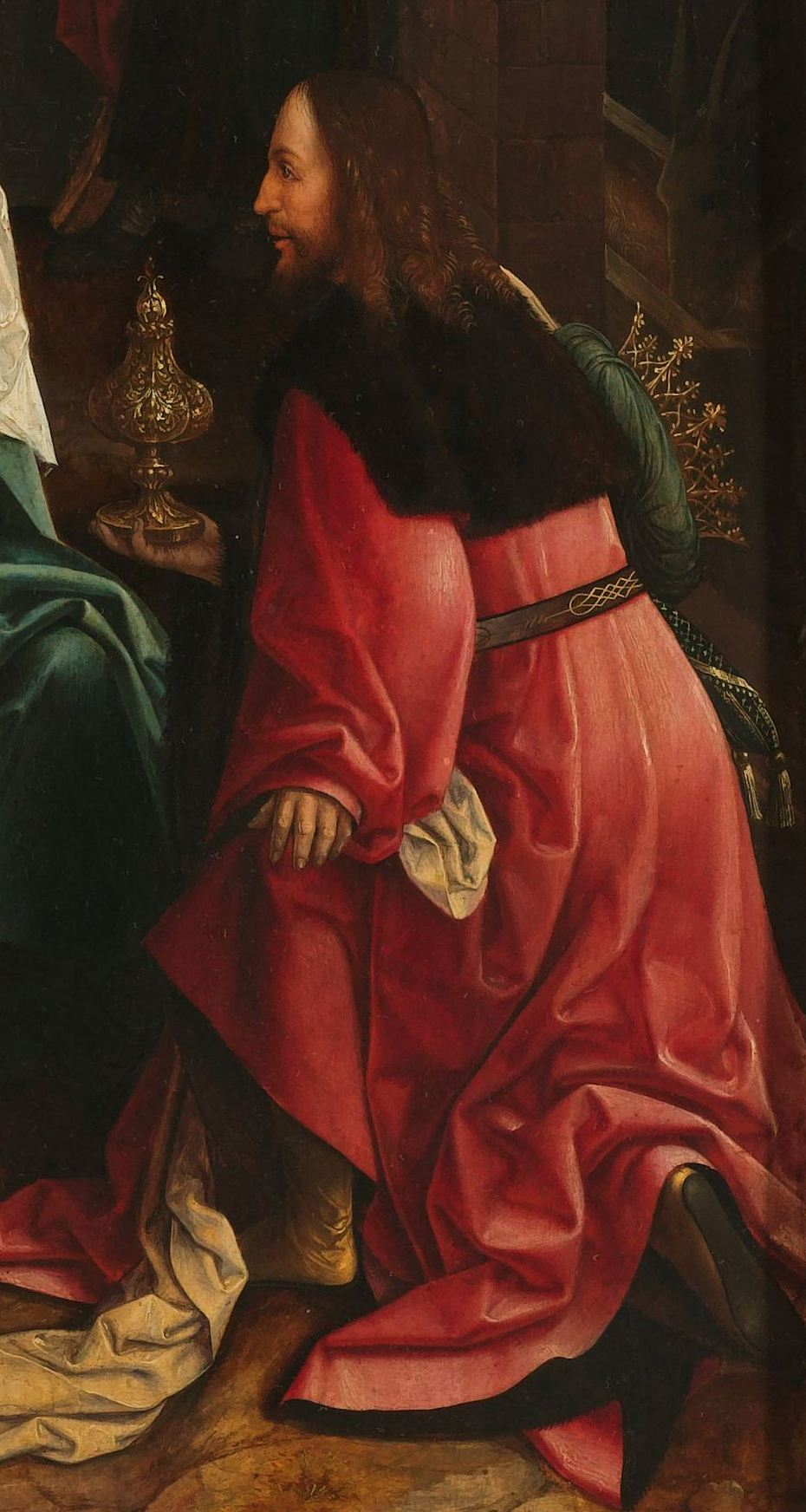
Caspar with silver covered beaker

== Wings ==
The painting is still accompanied by its original wings. On the left wing are the donor with his six sons and Saint Jerome, his patron saint. The man’s wife is depicted on the right wing with Saint Catherine of Alexandria and seven daughters. At the tops of the wings are the donors’ coats of arms. The outer wings are painted in grisaille with Saint Christopher on the left and Saint Anthony Abbot on the right, with two more coats of arms. In its opened state, the three paintings do not appear to fit with each other and may have been painted at different times. The children behind the donors wearing white shrouds are assumed to have had died before the painting was finished. Due to a lack of secure documentation, attribution was only established in the 20th century to Oostsanen based on underdrawings and comparison to his other works. The portrayed donors have been variously named due to a combination of genealogical research and identification of the coats of arms. Part of the documentation problem is not knowing whether the shrouded children were recorded as baptised or not. Currently RKDimages states that the left wing shows Claes Bouwensz. Cat (died 1536) with Saint Jerome and the right wing shows Volckgen Jansdr. with Saint Catherine of Alexandria.

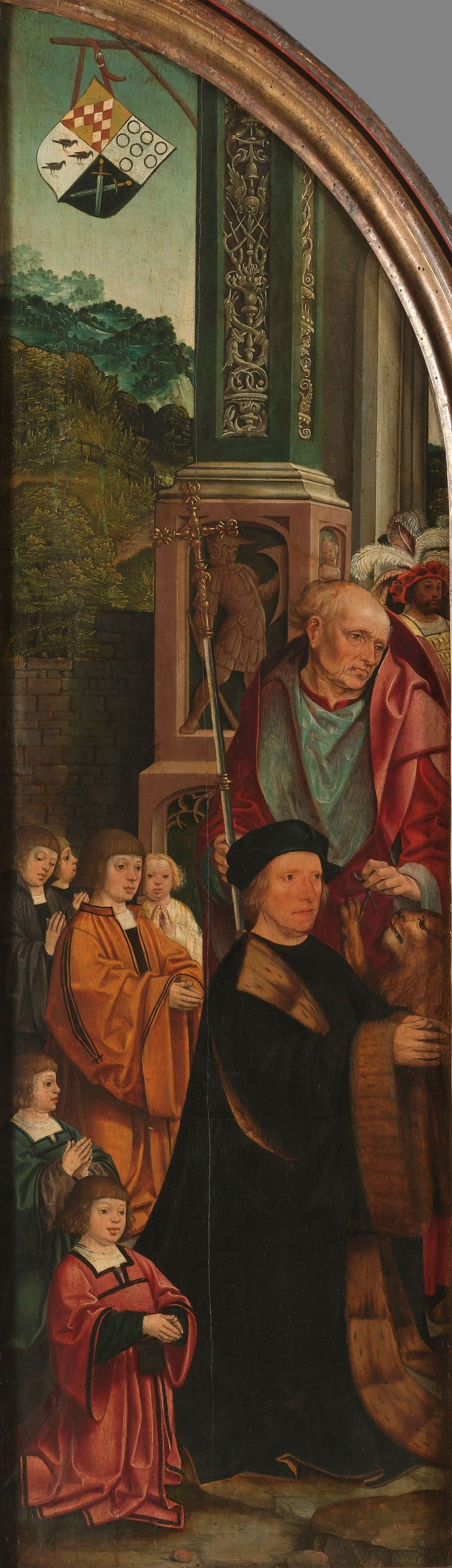
left wing

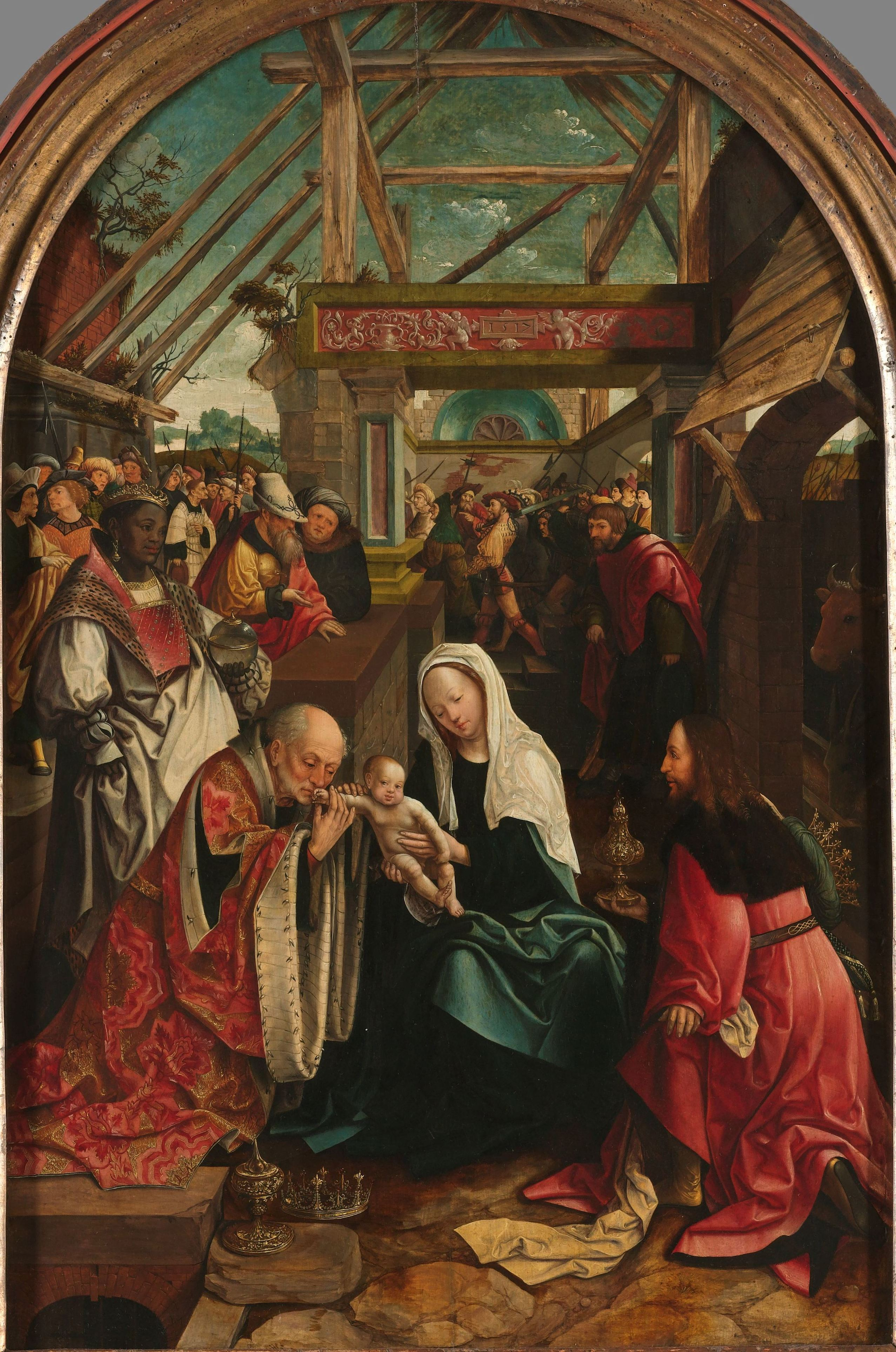
central panel

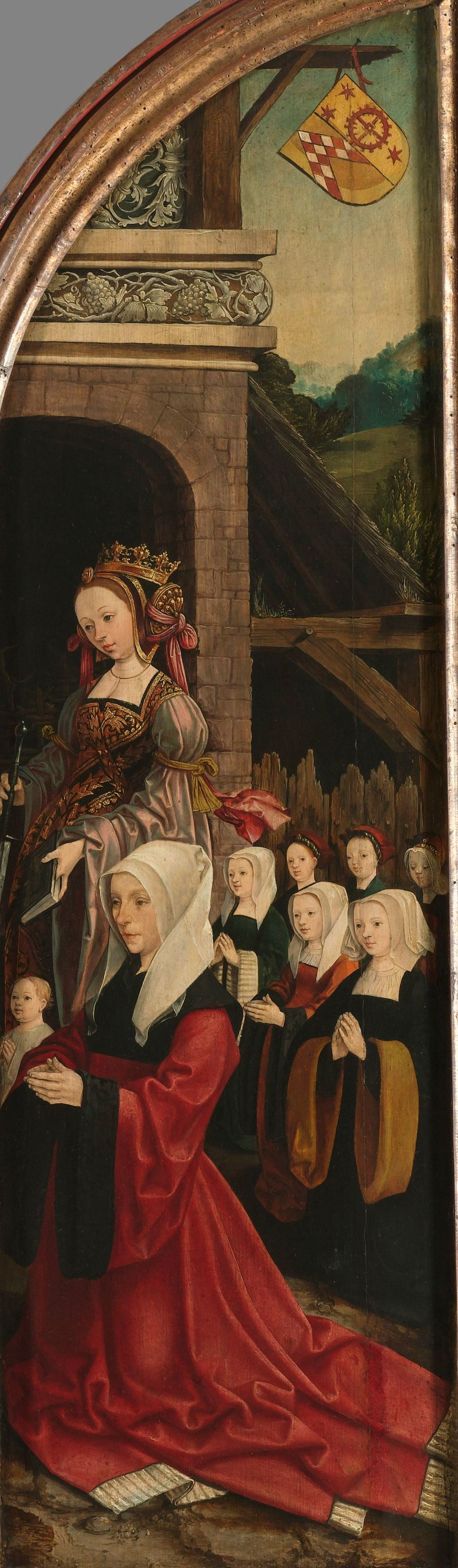
right wing

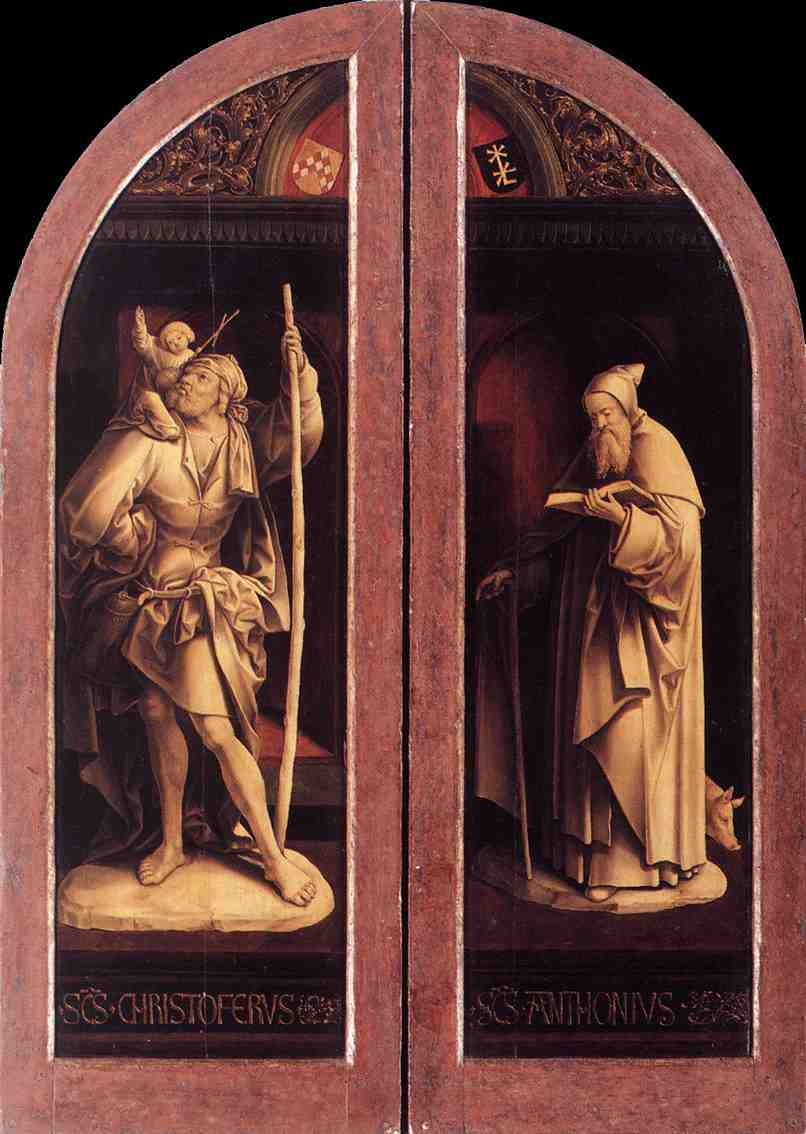
Closed view with Sts Christopher and Anthony

== Provenance ==
This painting was purchased in 1978 with support from the Prins Bernard Fonds and Vereniging Rembrandt from Mr and Mrs J. William Middendorf II for 1,145,833 guilders. It was purchased by William II of the Netherlands sometime before 1823 as by Jan Gossaert and was sold subsequently as by Hans Memling and catalogued in 1841 as Lucas van Leyden and in 1926 as by a Jan van Hout, documented in the workshop of the Master of Alkmaar, before being attributed to Jacob van Oostsanen by Max Jakob Friedländer in 1935. The painting's documentation goes no further back than to a Franciscan convent near Messiera in 1792.

== Other versions ==
Other versions exist but are no longer accompanied by wings.

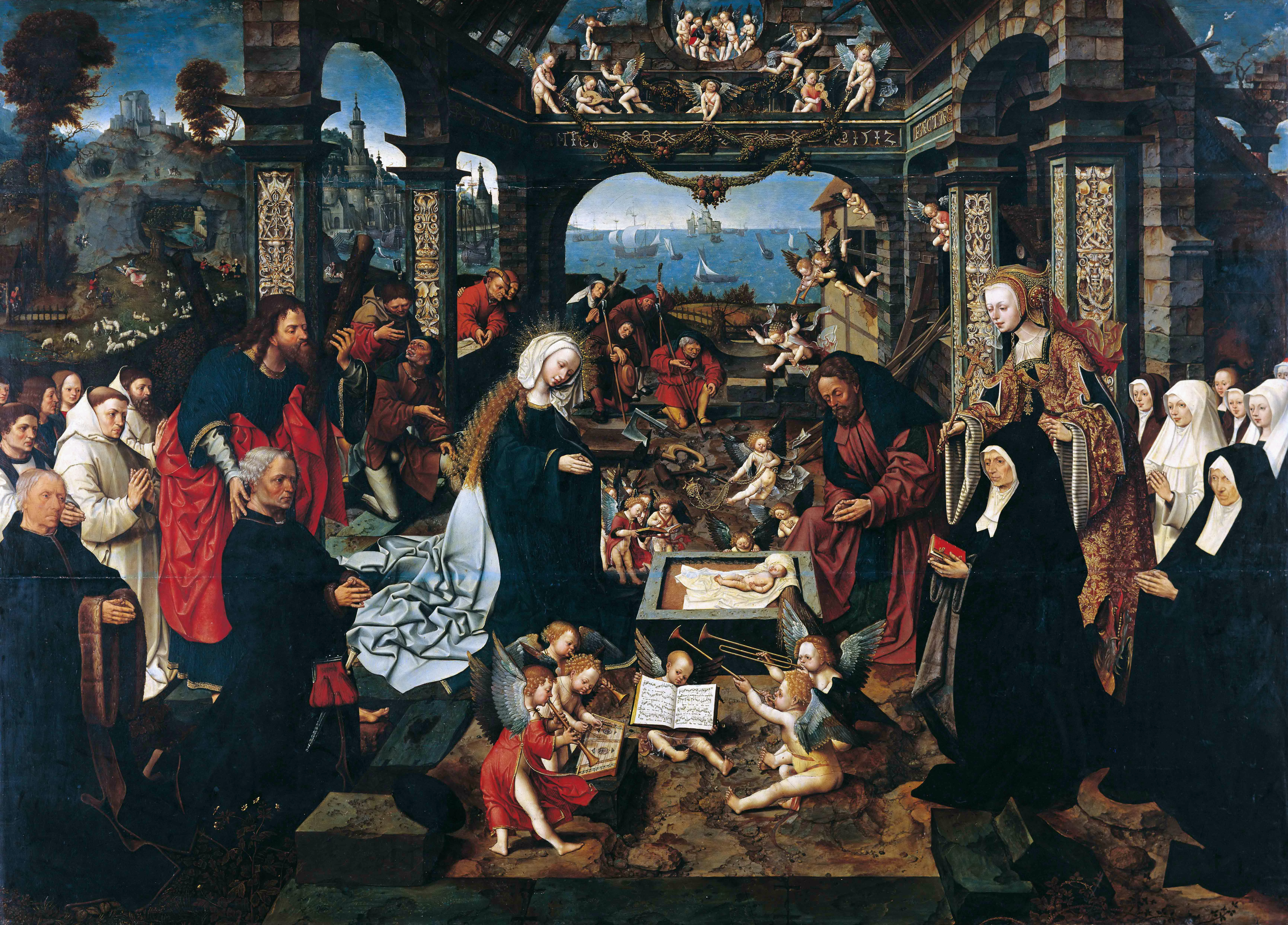
1512, Museo di Capodimonte, Naples

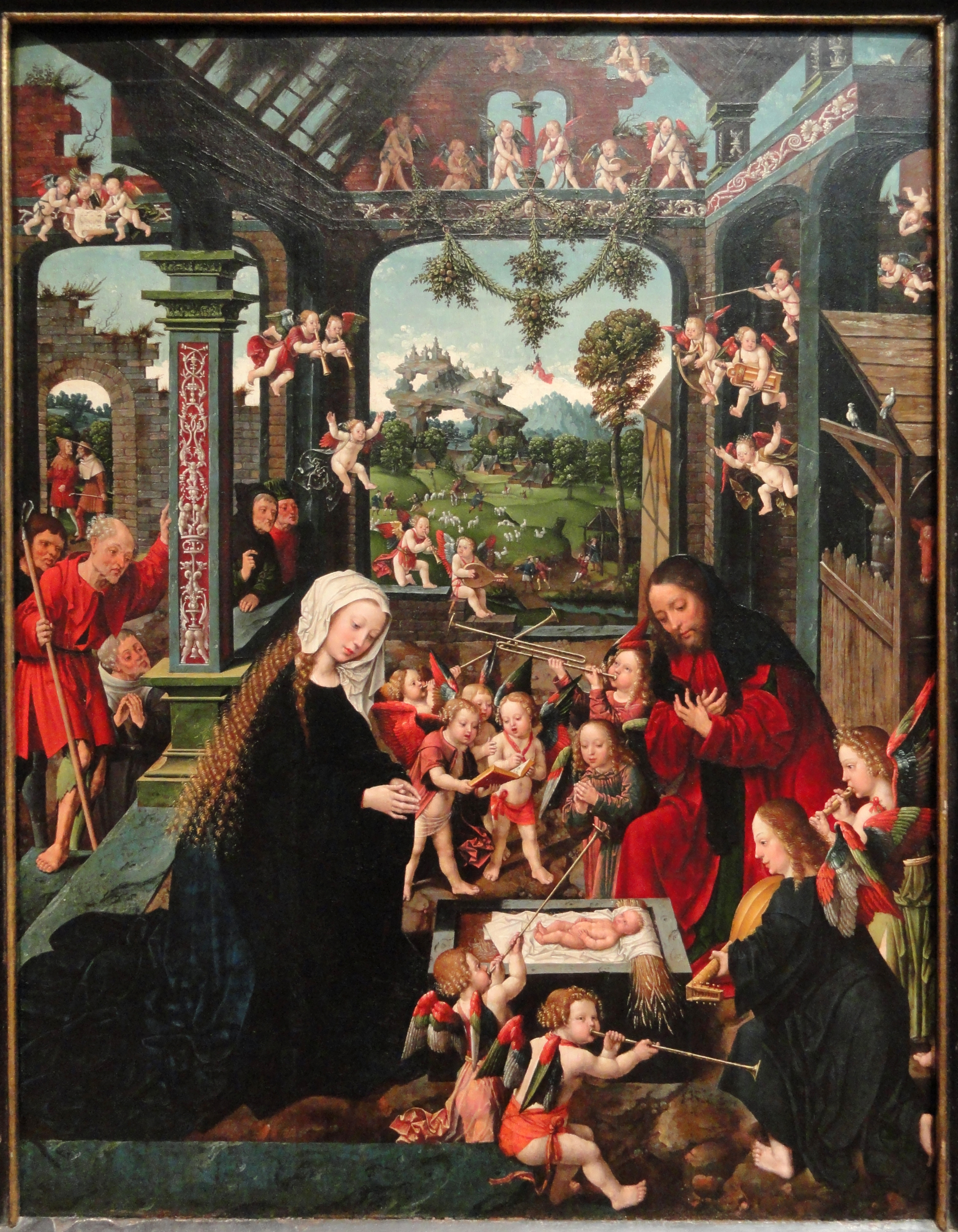
c. 1515, Art Institute of Chicago

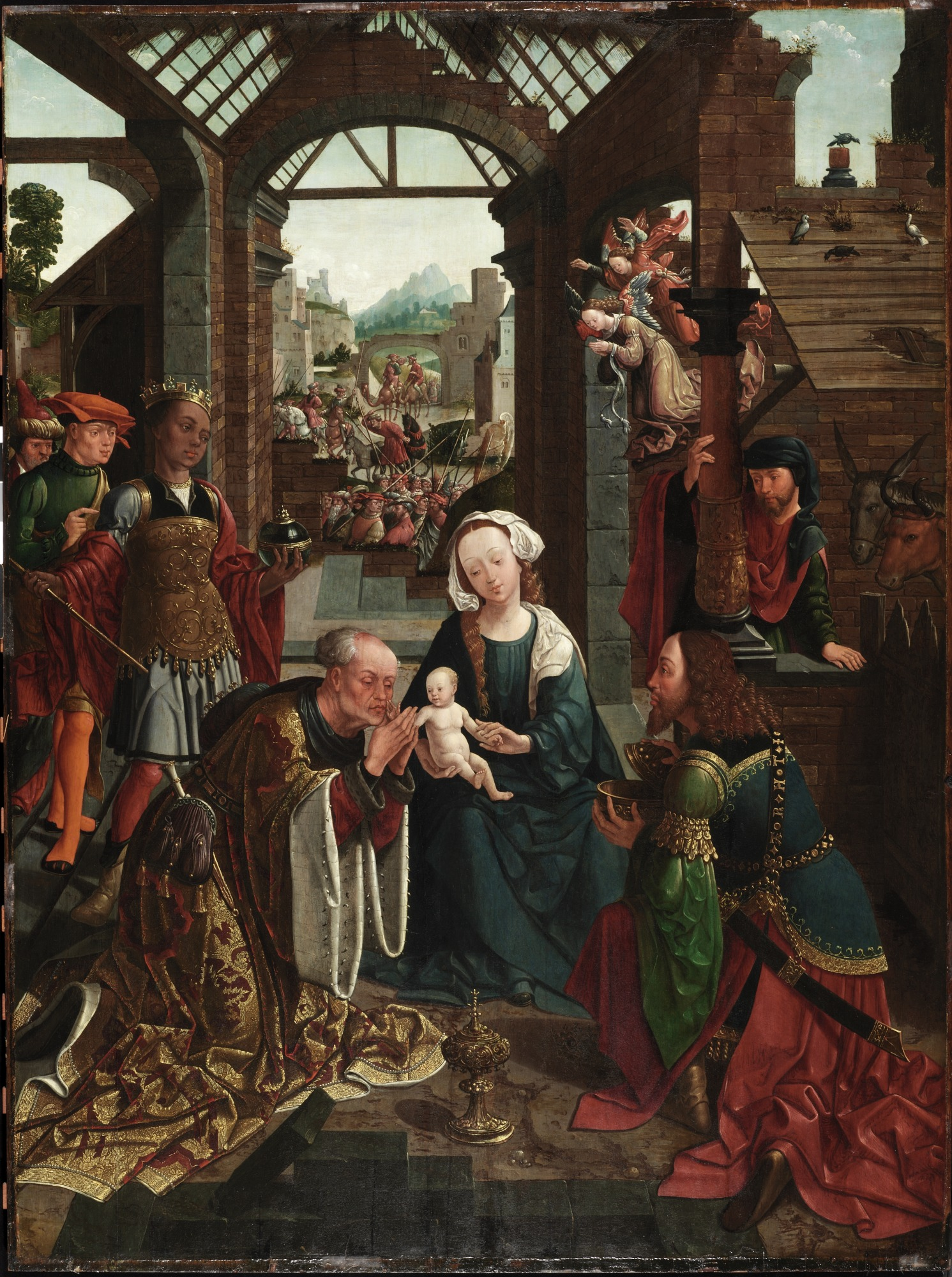
1512, Detroit Institute of Art

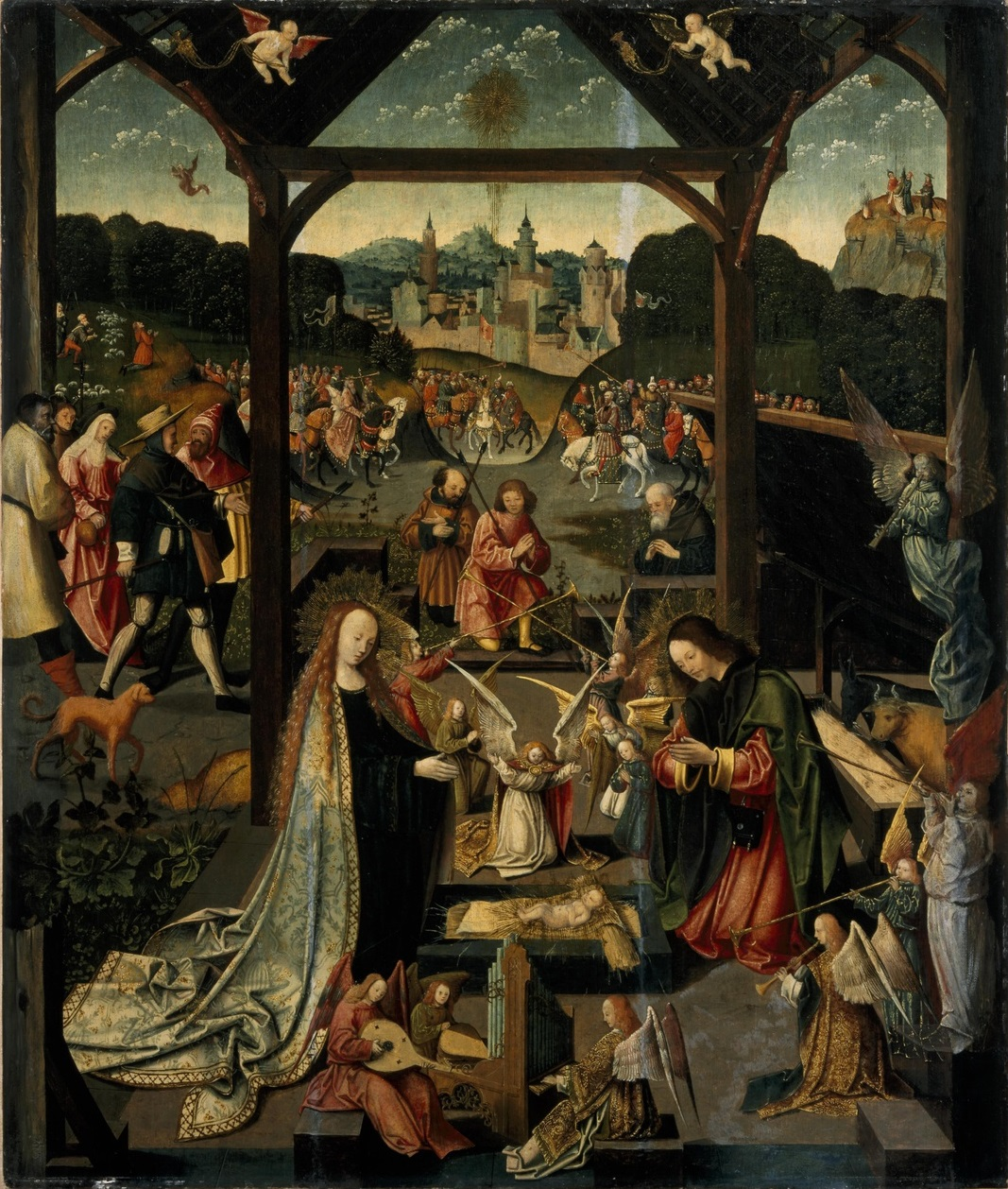
c. 1515, Centraal Museum, Utrecht
