= Dirck Jacobsz. =

Dutch painter

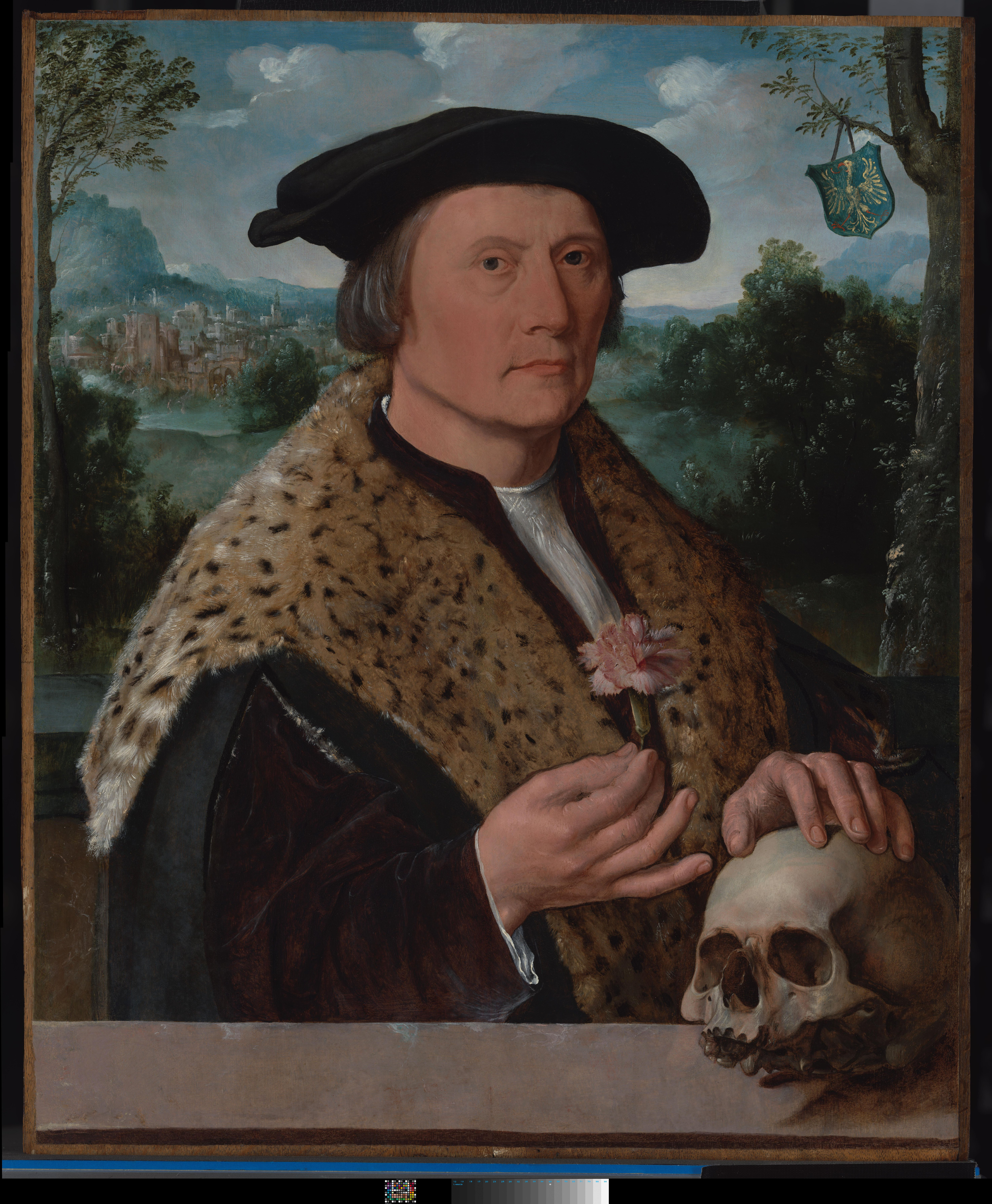
Dirck Jacobsz., Portrait of Pompeius Occo, Rijksmuseum Amsterdam, 1534

Dirck Jacobsz (1496–1567) was a Dutch Renaissance painter. His exact birthplace is unknown, but it was somewhere near Amsterdam.

== Career ==
Born into a family of painters, he was first trained by his father, Jacob Cornelisz van Oostsanen. Jacobsz. The Mannerist style of fellow Amsterdam painter Jan van Scorel profoundly influenced him. His painting The Crossbowmen (1529) was his most important piece. It was the first militia portrait in Dutch history. He married Marritgen Gerritsdr. in 1550, and they had two children, Maria Dircksdr. and Jacob Dircksz. Jacob later became a painter as well. Не painted two earlier group portraits of civic guards, which hang in the State Hermitage in Saint-Petersburg.

A group portrait of a riflemen's guild, painted in 1529, is considered his most important work, its triptych format being particularly unusual. It was the first military portrait in Dutch history. Subsequently, group portraits of riflemen's guilds became a specialty of Dutch painters.

Dirck Jacobsz. was married to Marritgen Gerrets (d. 1570) and, according to one source, owned a house on Warmoesstraat in Amsterdam in 1548. His son was the painter Jacob Dirksz. (d. 1568). Dirck Jacobsz. was buried in the Oude Kerk on June 27, 1567.
