= Self-Portrait (Kneller) =

1685 painting by Godfrey Kneller

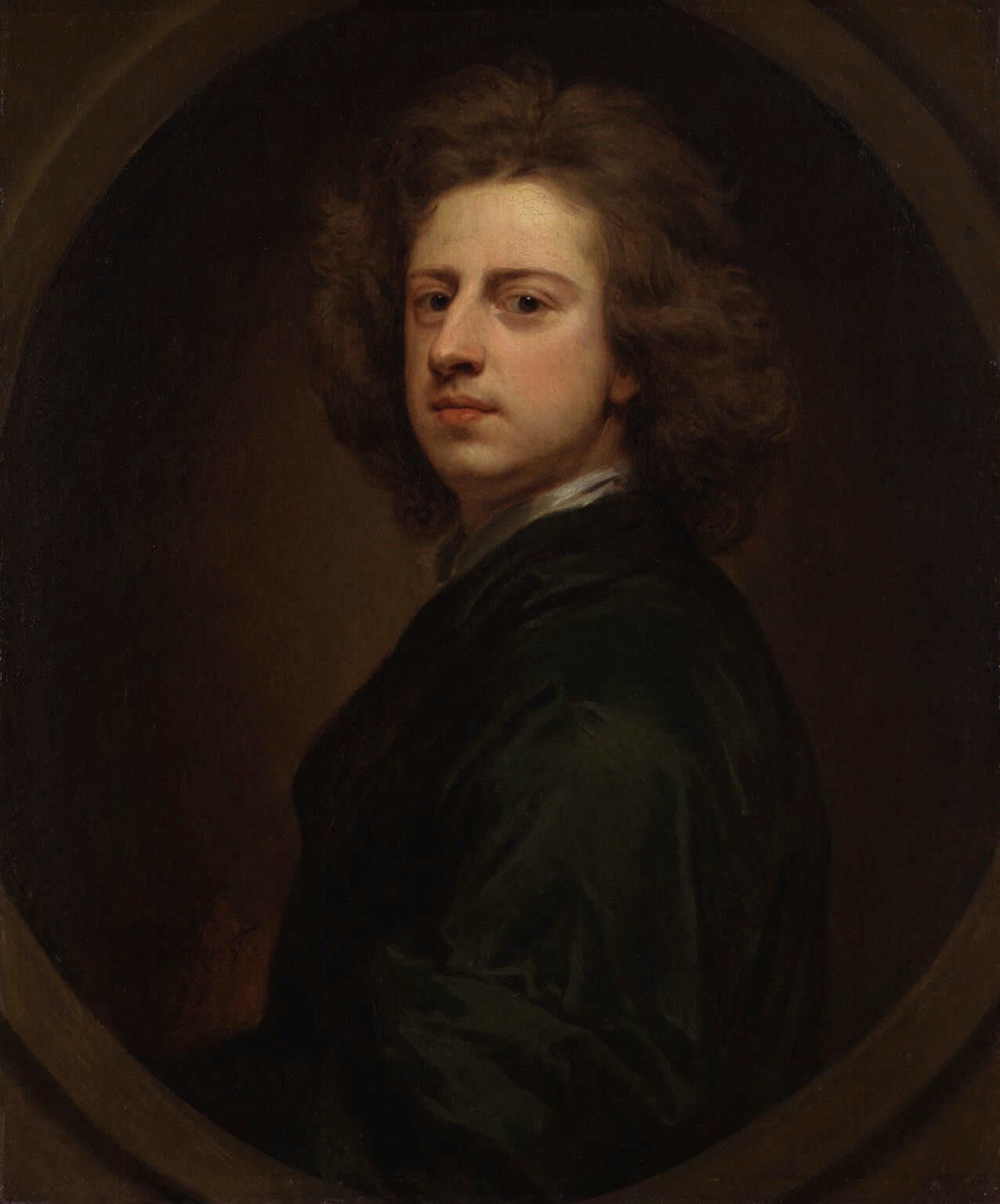
- Artist: Godfrey Kneller
- Year: 1685
- Medium: Oil on canvas
- Dimensions: 75.6 cm × 62.9 cm (29.8 in × 24.8 in)
- Location: National Portrait Gallery, London

Self-Portrait is a 1685 painting by the German-born British artist Sir Godfrey Kneller. A self-portrait, it shows the artist in his late 30s. Kneller had moved to England in 1676 around a decade earlier and had soon secured patronage from the ruling House of Stuart. For a number of years the painting was in the possession of the Dukes of Bedford at Woburn Abbey before being acquired for the collection of the National Portrait Gallery in London in 1951.

== Bibliography ==
- Allen, Brian. The British Portrait, 1660-1960. Antique Collectors' Club, 1991.
- Gowing, Lawrence. British Self Portraits, C.1580-c.1860. Arts Council, 1962.
- Piper, David. Catalogue of the Seventeenth Century Portraits in the National Portrait Gallery 1625-1714. 1963
