= Cesare Arbasia =

Italian painter (c.1540s–1614)

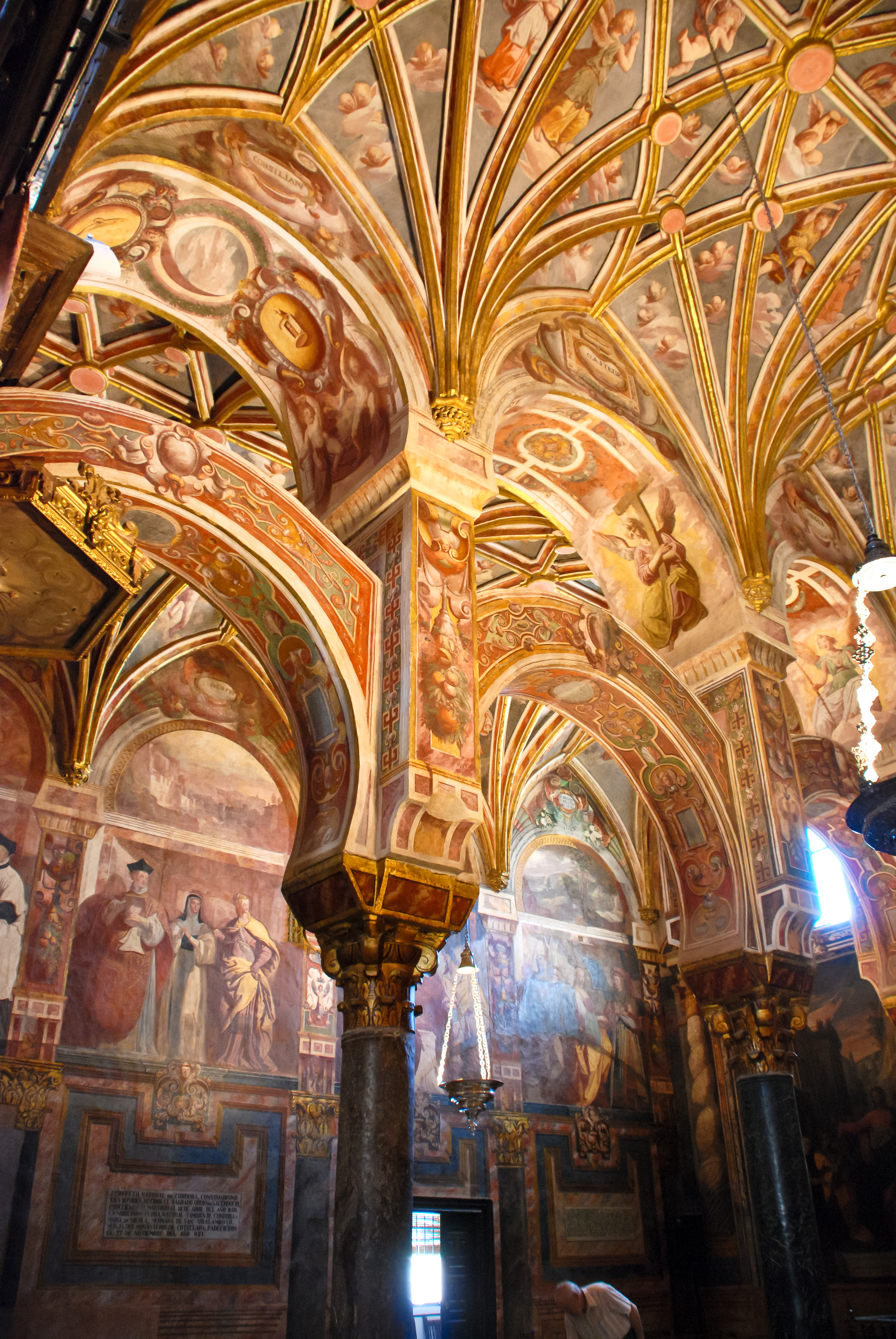
Paintings by Cesare Arbasia in the chapel of the Most Blessed Sacrament, in the Cathedral of Córdoba

Cesare Arbasia (1540s – 1614) was an Italian painter of the Mannerist period, active in Italy and Spain.

A student of Federico Zuccari, Arbasia began his career in his native Saluzzo. Around 1579, he began to travel, taking commissions in Rome, Málaga and Córdoba. In the latter city's cathedral, he painted the ceiling of the Most Blessed Sacrament chapel. In Savigliano, he painted the ceiling of the church of the Benedictine monks, while in Saluzzo he helped fresco the town hall. In 1601, he was pensioned by the ruler of the House of Savoy in Turin.
