= Saint Sebastian (Rubens) =

Painting by Peter Paul Rubens

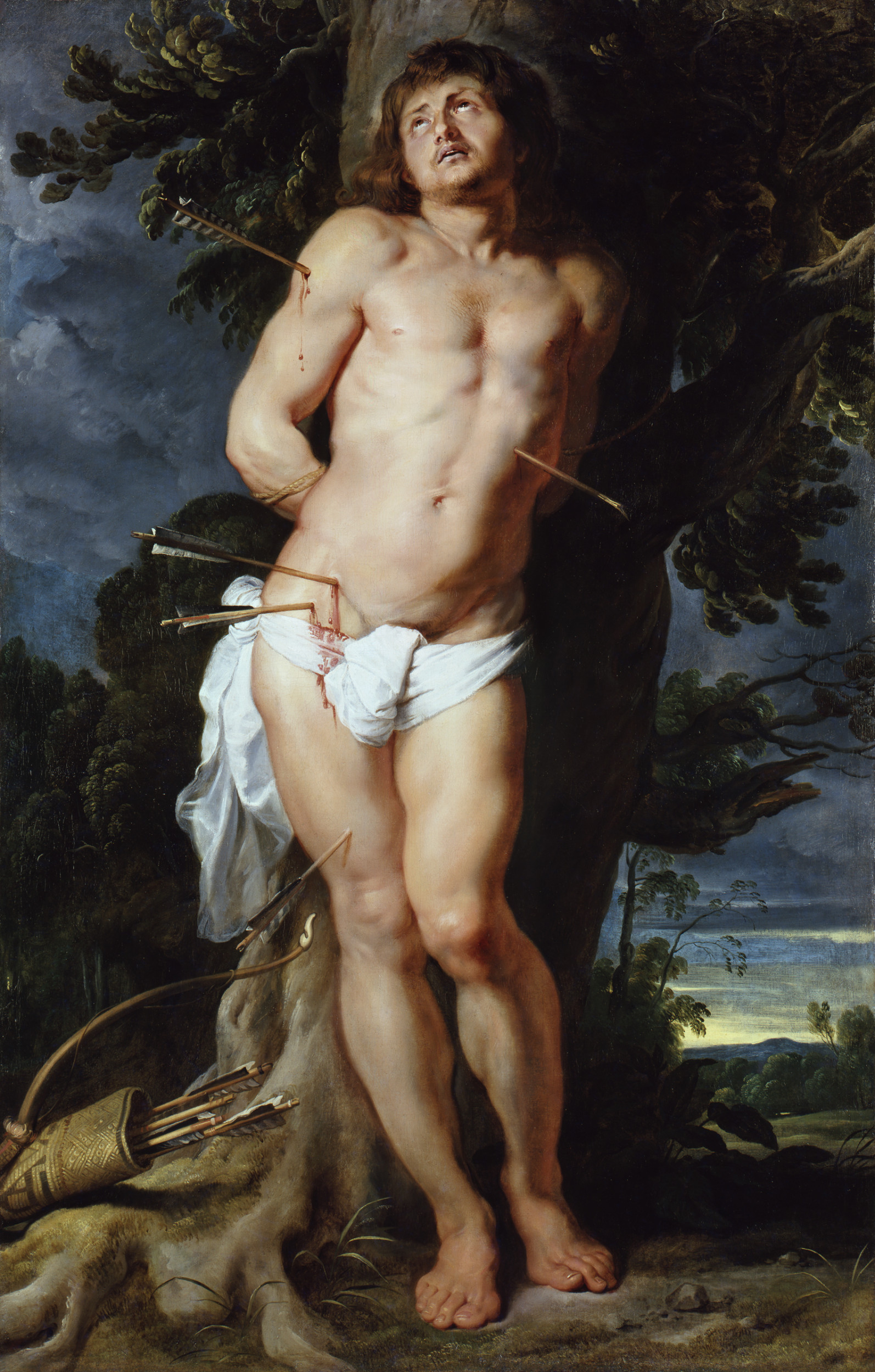
- Artist: Peter Paul Rubens
- Year: c. 1614
- Medium: Oil on canvas
- Dimensions: 200 cm × 120 cm (79 in × 47 in)
- Location: Gemäldegalerie; Berlin

Saint Sebastian is a painting of c. 1614 by Peter Paul Rubens, showing the Christian Saint Sebastian. It dates to the early years of Rubens's stay in Rome; its sinuous line and defined figures are thought to be the result of his studies of Michelangelo and of Flemish Mannerism. It was bought by the Borghese directly from Cardinal Neri Corsini in Brussels. It is now in the Gemäldegalerie in Berlin.

In 1618, Rubens wrote a letter to the Englishman Sir Dudley Carleton describing a collection of his own paintings he had at his home which he wished to trade, including a painting of a naked Saint Sebastian. It is more likely than not that this is that painting.
