= Allegory of Patience (Vasari) =

c. 1552 painting by Giorgio Vasari

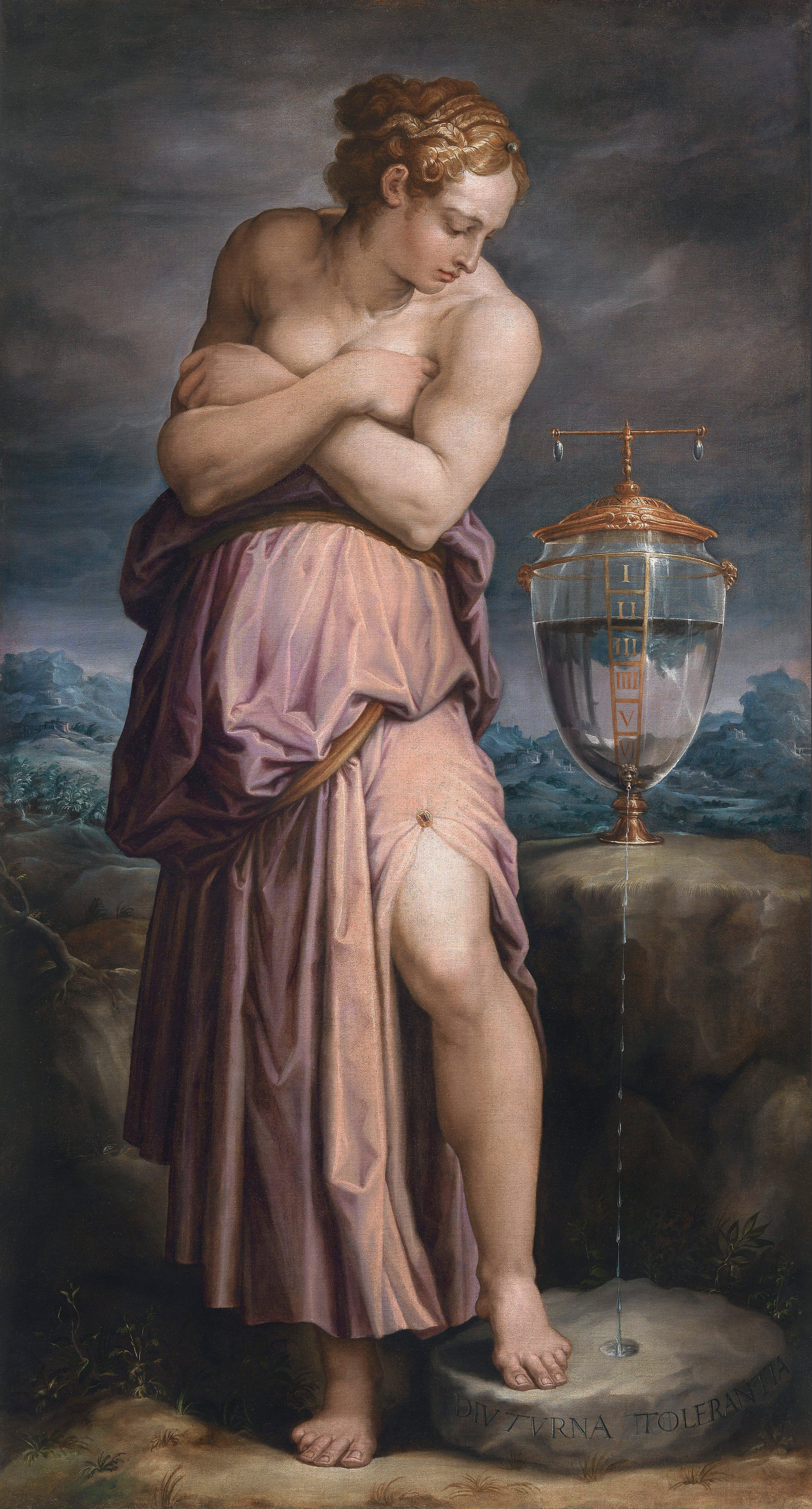
- Artist: Giorgio Vasari
- Year: c. 1552
- Medium: Oil on canvas
- Dimensions: 197.8 cm × 108.8 cm (77.9 in × 42.8 in)
- Location: Klesch Collection, Unknown

Allegory of Patience (Italian: L'Allegoria della Pazienza) is a painting of c. 1552 by Giorgio Vasari, with input from Michelangelo, for the Bishop of Arezzo Bernadetto Minerbetti.

== Description ==
The painting depicts a personification of Patience. The semi-nude female figure, her arms held tight across her body perhaps in modesty or "huddling" and "shivering" in the cold, gazes down watching as a water clock slowly erodes a stone inscribed with the Latin DIVTVRNA TOLERANTIA or "abiding patience", which is likely to be a reference to Cicero's De Inventione. (Note: patientia est honestatis aut utilitatis causa rerum arduarum ac difficilium voluntaria ac diuturna perpessio ["patience is a willing and sustained endurance of things arduous and difficult for reason of probity or utility"]) The landscape behind, with buildings but unfigured, and in "frostbitten turquoise", is seen inverted by refraction in the water vessel. The figure's braided hair gleams in the light, against a backdrop of a moody and sombre sky. According to the National Gallery, "the monumentality of the figure and iridescent colours are indebted to Michelangelo"; Matthias Wivel (a curator at that gallery) highlights also the "emotional exposure [Michelangelo] espoused".

== Correspondence ==
In a copy of a letter from the artist dated 14 November 1551 made by his nephew Giorgio Vasari the Younger, Vasari informed his patron Bernadetto Minerbetti, Bishop of Arezzo (Vasari's own home town), of his meetings with Michelangelo to agree a suitable representation of Patience. While the accompanying drawing is now lost, the letter describes in some detail a female figure "of middle age", half-clad so as to appear midway between Riches and Poverty, bound to a stone by her foot, "to give less offence to her more noble parts", but with her arms free, so that it is within her power to free herself, yet preferring instead to signal with them that she will wait till the water wears away the stone and thus sets her free. (Note: una femmina ritta, di mezza èta, né tutta vestita né tutta spogliata, acciò tenga fra la Ricchezza e la Povertà il mezzo, sia incatenata per il piè manco per offender meno la parte più nobile, sendo in libertà sua il potere con le mani sciolte scatenarsi e partirsi a posta sua. Aviamo messo la catena a quel sasso; e lei cortese, con le braccia mostra segno di non voler partire, finché el tempo non consuma con le gocciole dell'acqua la pietra, dove ella è incatenata: la quale a goiccia a goccia escie della eclissidera, oriuolo antico, che serviva agl'oratori mentre oravano. Così ristrettasi nelle spalle, mirando fisamente quanto gli bisogna spettare che si consumi la durezza del sasso, tollera e spetta con quella speranza che amaramente soffron coloro che stanno a disagio per finire il loro disegno con pazienza. Il motto mi pare che stia molto bene e a proposito nel sasso: 'Diuturna tollerantia'.) While in respect of the chain, the Allegory in the Palazzo Pitti first attributed to Vasari by Hermann Voss seemingly corresponds more closely to this vision, the presence of the Latin phrase (with a pentimento), selected with input from Annibale Caro, the very absence of physical bonds, emphasizing her choice and virtù, and the urn's clear function as a clepsydra help contribute to the identification.

== Provenance ==
The painting was acquired by the investor Gary Klesch and his wife Anita and identified as Vasari's Allegory of Patience by Carlo Falciani, an art historian at the Accademia di Belle Arti di Firenze.

== Gallery ==
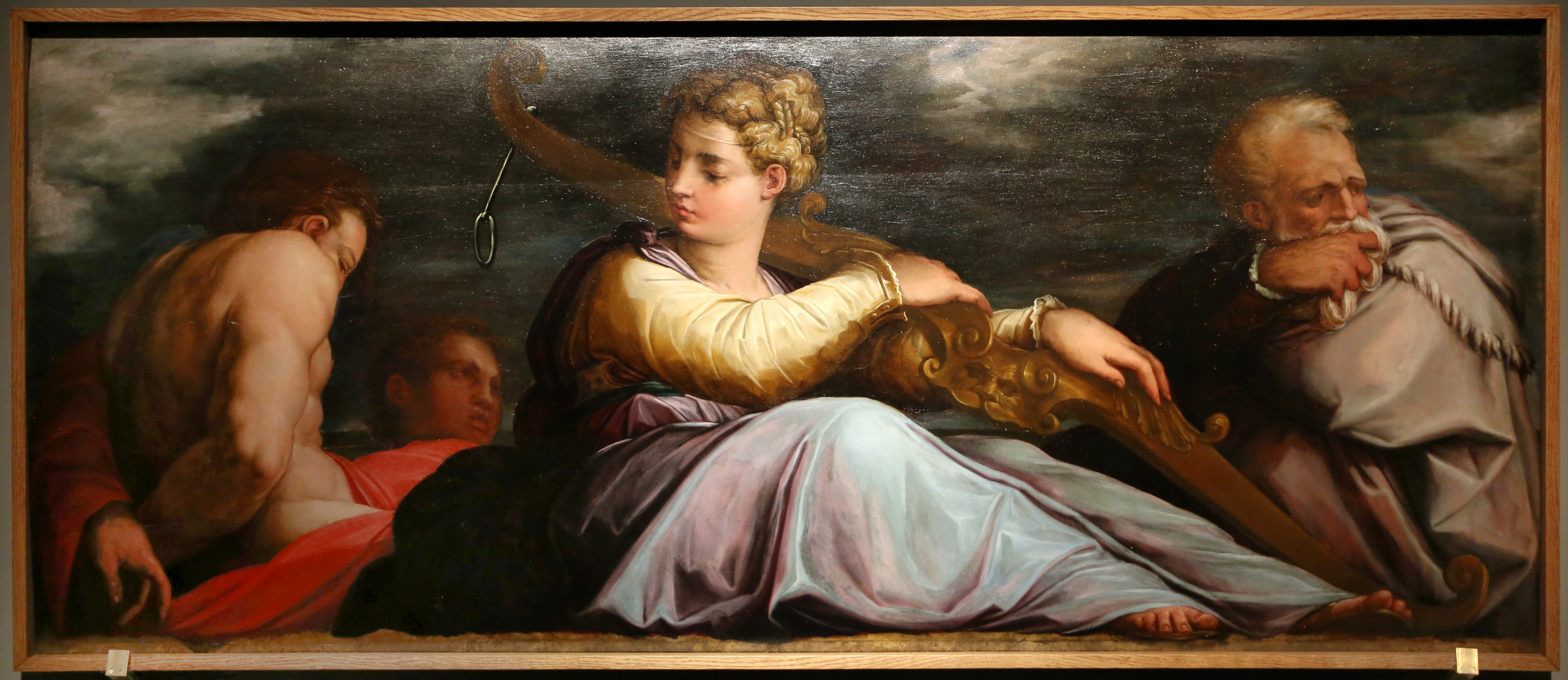
Patience, by Vasari (Gallerie dell'Accademia)

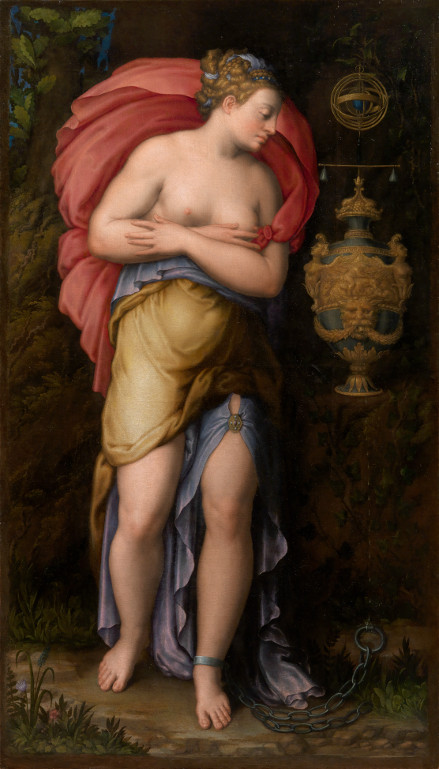
Allegory of Patience, attributed to Vasari (Palazzo Pitti)

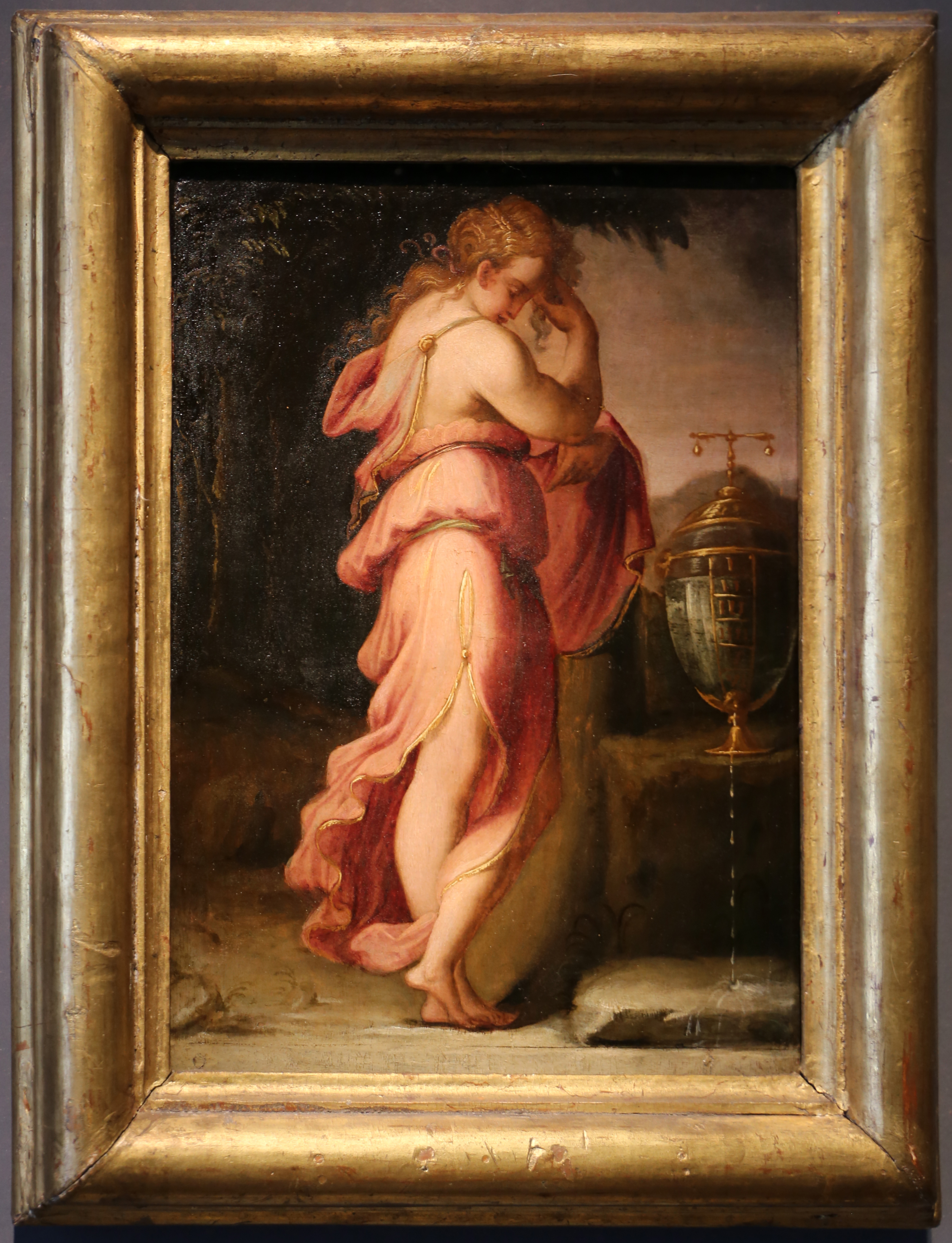
Allegory of Patience, attributed to Vasari (Uffizi)

== See also ==
- Lives of the Most Excellent Painters, Sculptors, and Architects
