= Jan van Aken (painter) =

Dutch painter (1614–1661)

Jan van Aken (1614 – March 1661) was a Dutch Golden Age painter and engraver.

== Biography ==
Van Aken was born and died in Amsterdam, but has been frequently confused with the celebrated German painter Johann van Achen of Cologne. Not much is known of his paintings but Bartsch enumerates twenty-one of his etchings, which are touched in the manner of Herman Saftleven. They are very slight but display great mastery.

Houbraken describes an etching by him from his own design, which he says is very scarce. He terms it the Travellers On Horseback. It is marked "J.V Aken, inv. et fec.". Among those mentioned are six horses after Pieter van Laer or Bamboccio and six views of the Rhine after Saftleven. He was also influenced by Philips Wouwerman.

== See also ==
- Hieronymus Bosch, born Jeroen van Aken
