= The Seven Works of Mercy (Master of Alkmaar) =

1504 seven panel painting

The Seven Works of Charity
- The seven Acts of Mercy
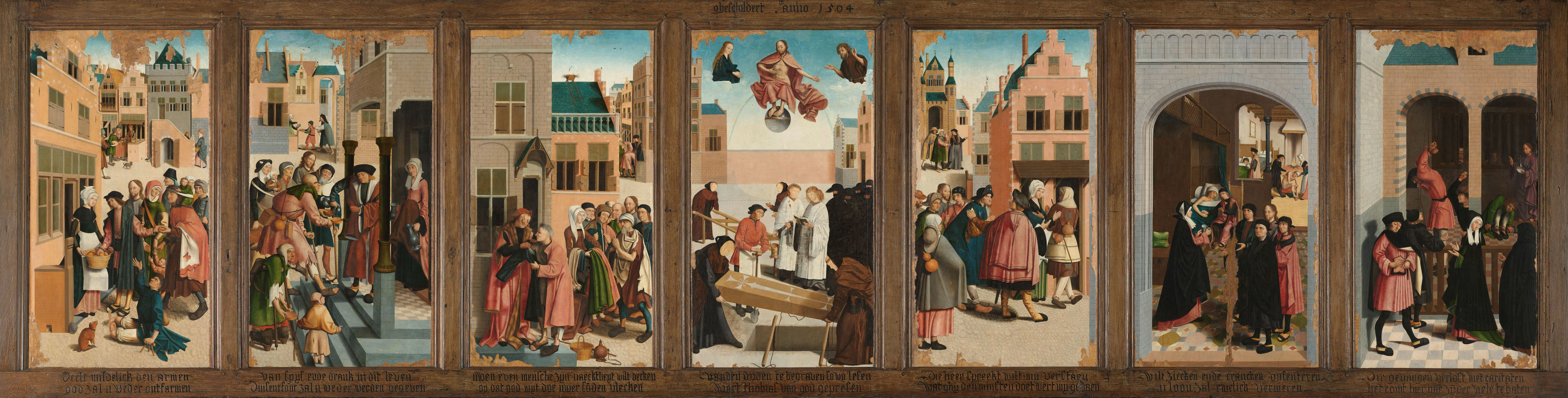
- Artist: Master of Alkmaar
- Year: 1504
- Medium: oil paint, panel
- Dimensions: 101 cm (40 in) × 55.5 cm (21.9 in)
- Location: Rijksmuseum, Netherlands
- Accession: SK-A-2815

The Seven Works of Mercy is a 1504 oil on panel painting by the Master of Alkmaar, consisting of seven panels, each showing one of the works of mercy.

The paintings show the corporal works of mercy, with Jesus in the background viewing each, in this order: feeding the hungry, giving drink to the thirsty, clothing the naked, burying the dead, sheltering the traveler, comforting the sick, and ransoming the captive.

In the upper centre of the central panel the Last Judgement is depicted. According to the biblical sources (Mt 25:31–46), a decisive factor in the Last Judgement will be the moral question if the corporal works of mercy were practiced or not during lifetime. They rate as important acts of charity. Therefore, the conjunction of the Last Judgement and the works of mercy was very frequent in the pictorial tradition of Christian art, especially in the Middle Ages and Early Modern Era.

The Seven Works of Mercy not only explains what the Bible says about virtuous deeds and salvation, but the work also visualizes how the beholder should react after the message becomes clear to him or her. This is evident in the way the group in the front, the members of the confraternity, set an example for the small group in the backgrounds of the panels: they concretize the example set by the confraternity by participating in acts of mercy in their own daily lives.

The picture series by the Master of Alkmaar was likely commissioned by the regents of the Holy Spirit almshouse in Alkmaar, before being moved to the church of St Lawrence in the town in 1574. The panel remained in St Lawrence until 24 June 1582.

It was then bought from the church of St Lawrence in July 1918 by its present owner, the Rijksmuseum in Amsterdam. From 2004 to 2010, it was loaned to the Museum Boijmans Van Beuningen.

The paintings, bearing the stamp of Geertgen tot Sint Jans, are done in bright colors, and their figures are drawn in an exaggeratedly caricatured manner. It has been proposed that this artist is identical to Cornelis Buys I, the brother of Jacob Cornelisz van Oostsanen; he is known to have been active in Alkmaar between 1490 and 1524. More recently, the name of Pieter Gerritsz, originally of Haarlem, has been proposed, he being in Alkmaar beginning in 1502. This artist, in 1518, was compensated for a painting of Saint Bavo in Haarlem, and his name can be found in records of the Egmond Abbey and of the church of Saint Lawrence in Alkmaar, over a period covering the years 1515 to 1529.

== Holy Spirit Confraternity in Alkmaar and The Seven Works of Mercy: ==
The general assumption about the origin of The Seven Works of Mercy is that it was commissioned by the Holy Ghost Confraternity of Alkmaar. This brotherhood had operated in the Waag in Alkmaar from approximately 1385 until 1572 and the building functioned as a place where the sick were cared for, travelers were accommodated and where the aid to the poor was organized.

Another function mentioned in Matthew 25 is the visiting of the imprisoned. In the Middle Ages, this act expanded to encompass the ransoming of those prisoners who were guilty of minor offenses, which was also one of the occupations of the Holy Ghost Confraternity.

The seven scenes thus depict exactly those acts that define the confraternity as a corporal entity. Some art historians interpret the figures in the sixth panel as being members of the confraternity who commissioned the work. This idea of including a portrait of oneself when commissioning a religious work was namely a common practice in the sixteenth century. A part of membership in confraternities and guilds was the benefit of a burial of both members and those members' relatives. Although the burying of the dead is not mentioned as one of the works of mercy mentioned in Matthew 25, it was added by the Church in the Middle Ages.

== Condition of the work ==
Throughout its life, The Seven Works of Mercy has had a lot to suffer. Around the edges of each panel, the painted surface is significantly damaged because of water damage. During its restoration between 1971 and 1975, it was decided to not cover up the paint loss and instead present it as part of the work's turbulent history. The same goes for the mutilation of the figures' faces in the painting, most evident in the middle panel. Technical analysis of the work shows that the work has been attacked brutally with a sharp object, leaving the faces unidentifiable and deep holes here and. During the restoration of the work, there was even a piece of iron discovered which was part of the tool. Dating of the damage indicated that the work had been attacked before the year 1582, probably during the iconoclastic riots of 1566.

In 1582, The Seven Works of Mercy, as well as depictions on the pulpit of the Saint Lawrence Church, were cladded with black paint by Jaques Mostaert van Brabant and Marcus Blancveneur. After the Saint Lawrence Church was handed over to the Protestants in 1572, a 'purification' of the church's interior took place. The work by the Master of Alkmaar, as well as the pulpit remained untouched, which not everyone appreciated. Apparently the two men, Mostaert and Blancveneur, were bothered by this fact and attacked the Church in the night of the 24th of June, 1582. Regarding the painting, they were particularly bothered by the middle panel, in which priests were seen surrounding a grave and sprinkling holy water, an act going against Protestant practices.
