= Works of mercy =

Meritorious works or acts in morals

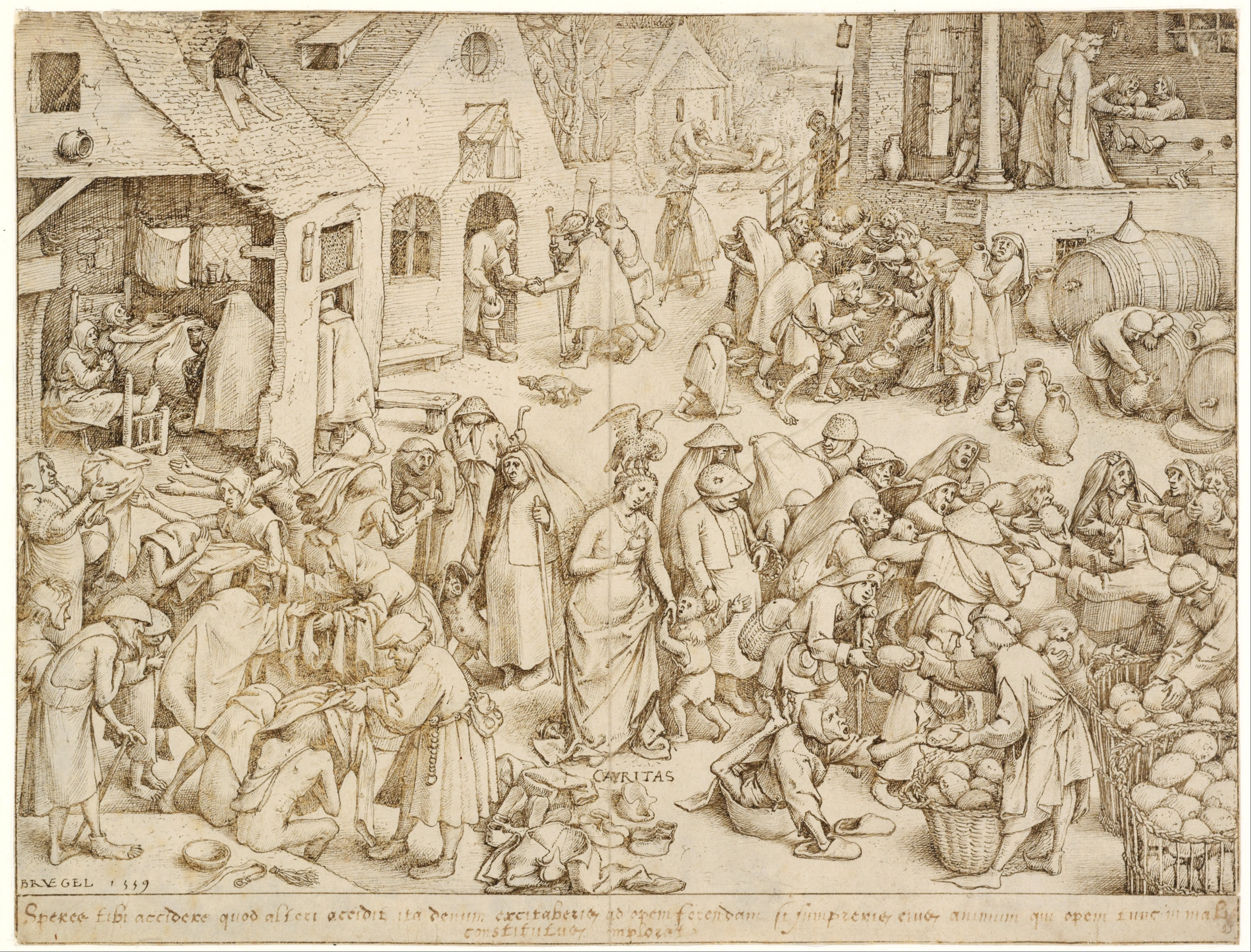
Caritas, The Seven Acts of Mercy, pen and ink drawing by Pieter Bruegel the Elder, 1559. (Note: Anticlockwise from lower right: feed the hungry, give drink to the thirsty, ransom the captive, bury the dead, shelter the stranger, comfort the sick, and clothe the naked.)

Works of mercy (sometimes called acts of mercy) are practices considered meritorious in Christian ethics.

The practice is popular in the Catholic Church as an act of both penance and charity. In addition, the Methodist Church teaches that the works of mercy are a means of grace that evidence holiness of heart (entire sanctification).

The works of mercy have traditionally been divided into two categories, each with seven elements:

1. "Corporal works of mercy" which concern the material and physical needs of others.
2. "Spiritual works of mercy" which concern the spiritual needs of others.

Pope John Paul II issued the papal encyclical Dives in misericordia, on 30 November 1980, declaring that "Jesus Christ taught that man not only receives and experiences the mercy of God, but that he is also called upon 'to practice mercy' towards others." Another notable devotion associated with the works of mercy is the Divine Mercy, which derives from apparitions of Jesus Christ to Saint Faustina Kowalska.

== In the Catholic Church ==
Based on Jesus' parable of The Sheep and the Goats and other accounts in the New Testament, the corporal and spiritual works of mercy are a means of grace as good deeds; they are also a work of justice pleasing to God, and a sign of the authenticity of a believer's worship of God.

The precept is an affirmative obligation—that is, it is always binding, though not always operative due to lack of opportunity, matter, or suitable circumstances. In practice, its actual force in a given case depends largely on a person's capacity.

There are clear limitations on how the precept applies to the performance of the corporal works of mercy. Similarly, the law governing the spiritual works of mercy is subject to important qualifications in individual cases. Some acts may require particular tact, prudence, or knowledge. For example, instructing the ignorant, counseling the doubtful, and consoling the sorrowful are not within everyone's ability. By contrast, other duties (such as bearing wrongs patiently, forgiving offenses willingly, and praying for the living and the dead) do not demand any special talents or gifts for their proper observance.

In his message for the 2016 World Day of Prayer for the Care of Creation, Pope Francis suggested "care for creation" as a new work of mercy, describing it as a "complement" to the existing works. Francis characterized this new work as having both corporal and spiritual components. Corporally, it involves "daily gestures which break with the logic of violence, exploitation and selfishness". Spiritually, it involves contemplating each part of creation to find what God is teaching mankind through them. This pronouncement extensively quoted the encyclical Laudato si', and Cardinal Peter Turkson, who helped write the encyclical, clarified that the addition of this work of mercy was part of Francis' intention for Laudato si'.

=== Corporal works of mercy ===
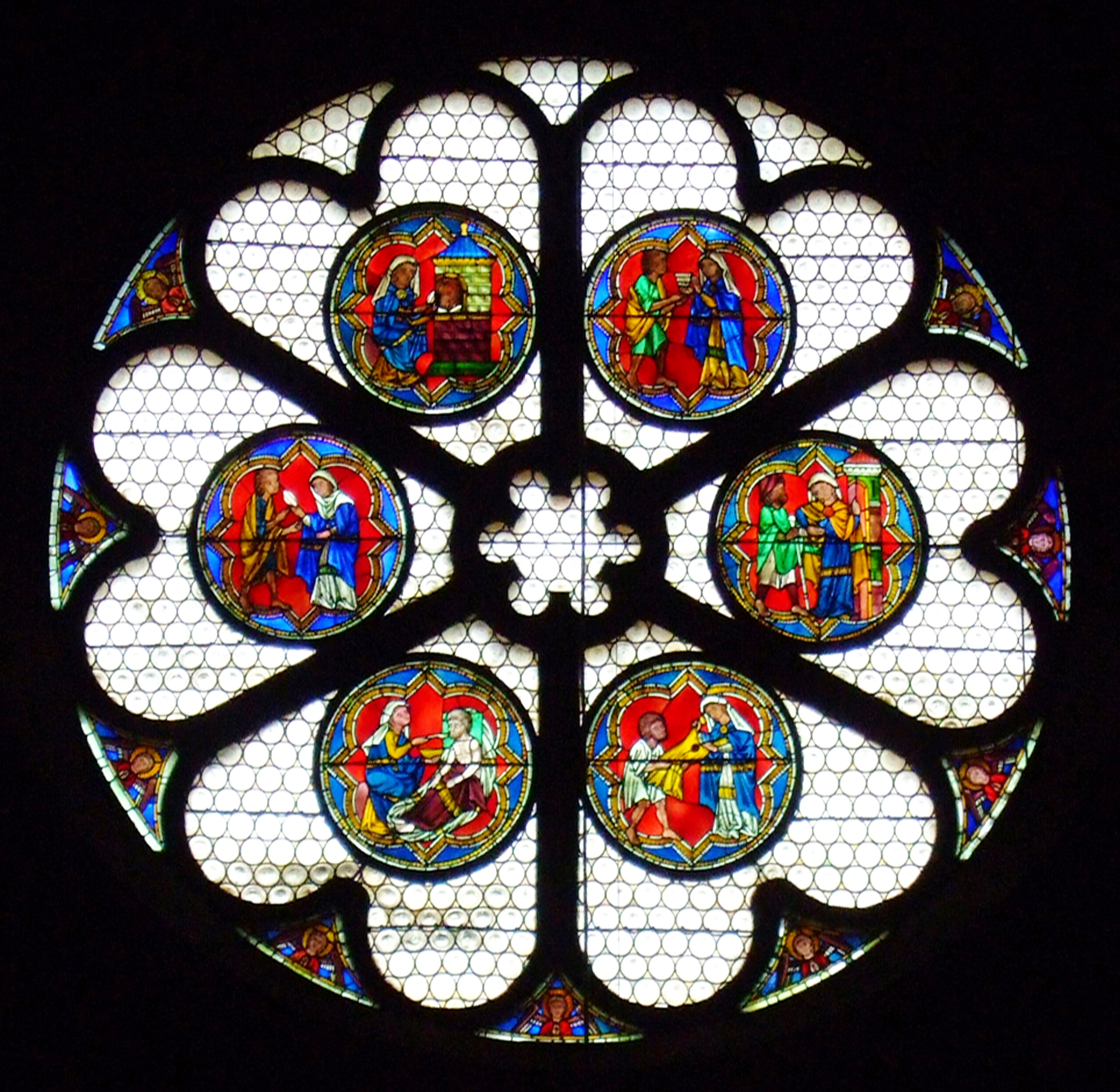
The six Corporal Works of Mercy, Freiburg Minster, c. 1230

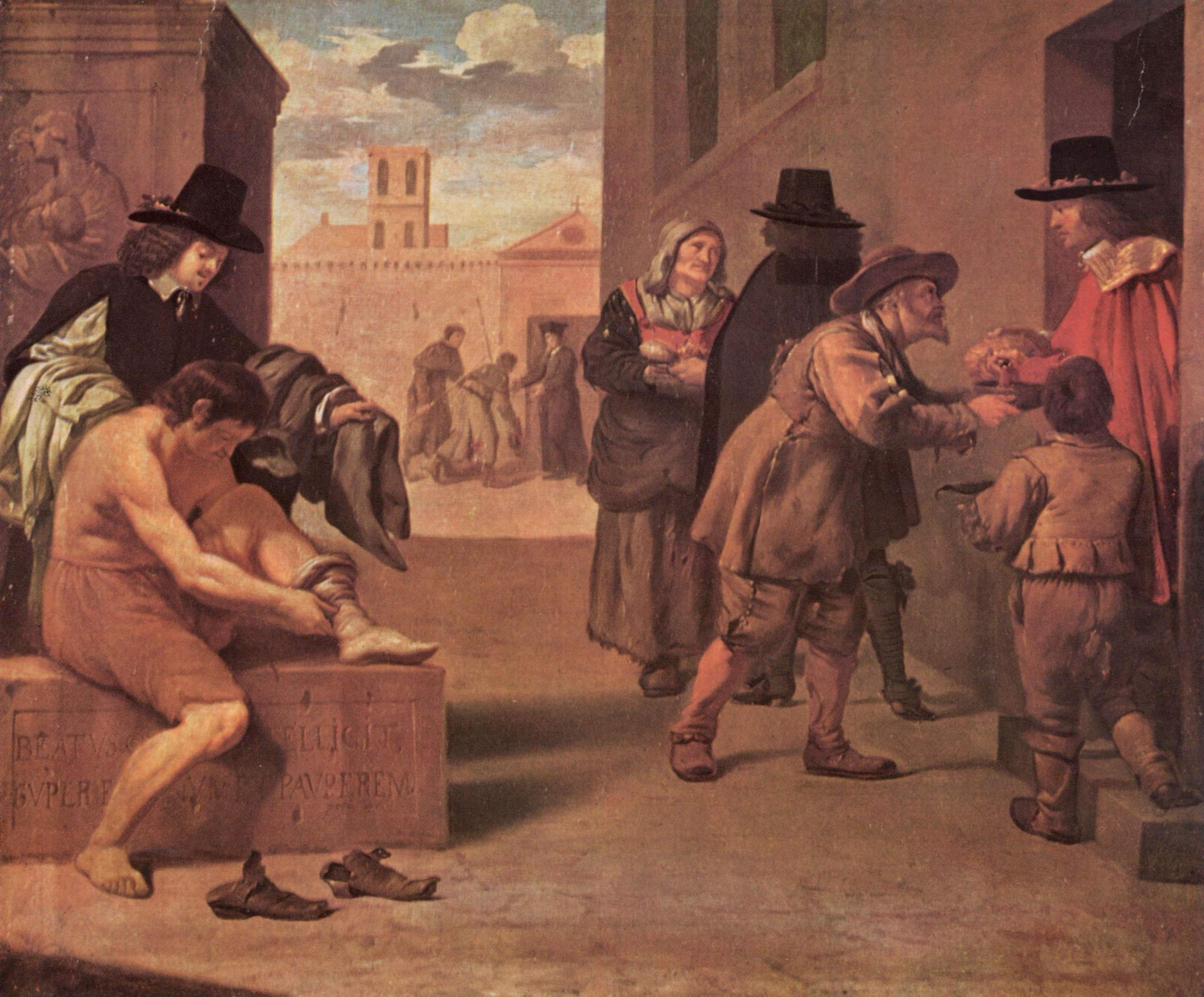
Works of Mercy by Pierre Montallier, 1680

Corporal works of mercy are those that tend to the bodily needs of other creatures. The standard list is given by Jesus in Chapter 25 of the Gospel of Matthew, in the famous sermon on the Last Judgment. They are also mentioned in the Book of Isaiah. The seventh work of mercy comes from the Book of Tobit and from the mitzvah of burial, although it was not added to the list until the Middle Ages.

The works include:

1. To feed the hungry
2. To give water to the thirsty
3. To clothe the naked
4. To shelter the homeless
5. To visit the sick
6. To visit the imprisoned, or ransom the captive
7. To bury the dead

=== Spiritual works of mercy ===
Just as the corporal works of mercy are directed towards relieving corporeal suffering, the aim of the spiritual works of mercy is to relieve spiritual suffering. They were codified in or before the Catechism of the Council of Trent of 1566.

The works include:

1. To instruct the ignorant
2. To counsel the doubtful
3. To admonish the sinners
4. To bear patiently those who wrong oneself
5. To forgive offenses
6. To comfort the afflicted
7. To pray for the living and the dead

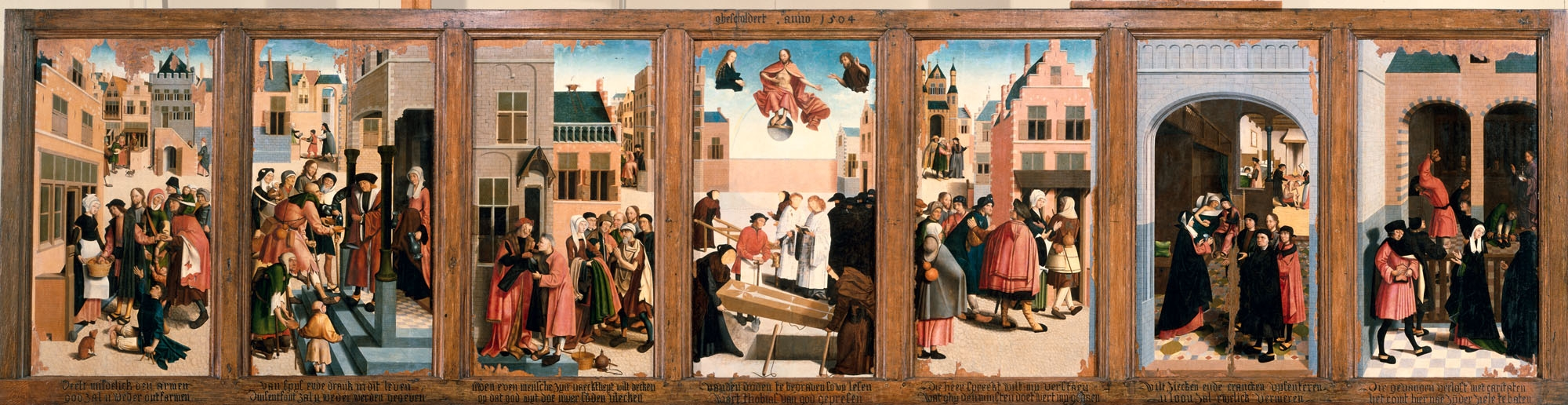
Master of Alkmaar, The Seven Works of Mercy, c. 1504, polyptych (Amsterdam, Rijksmuseum)

=== Representation in art ===
The corporal works of mercy are an important subject of Christian iconography. In some representations of the Middle Ages, the seven works were allegorically juxtaposed with the seven deadly sins (avarice, anger, envy, laziness, unchastity, intemperance, pride). The pictorial representation of the works of mercy began in the 12th century.

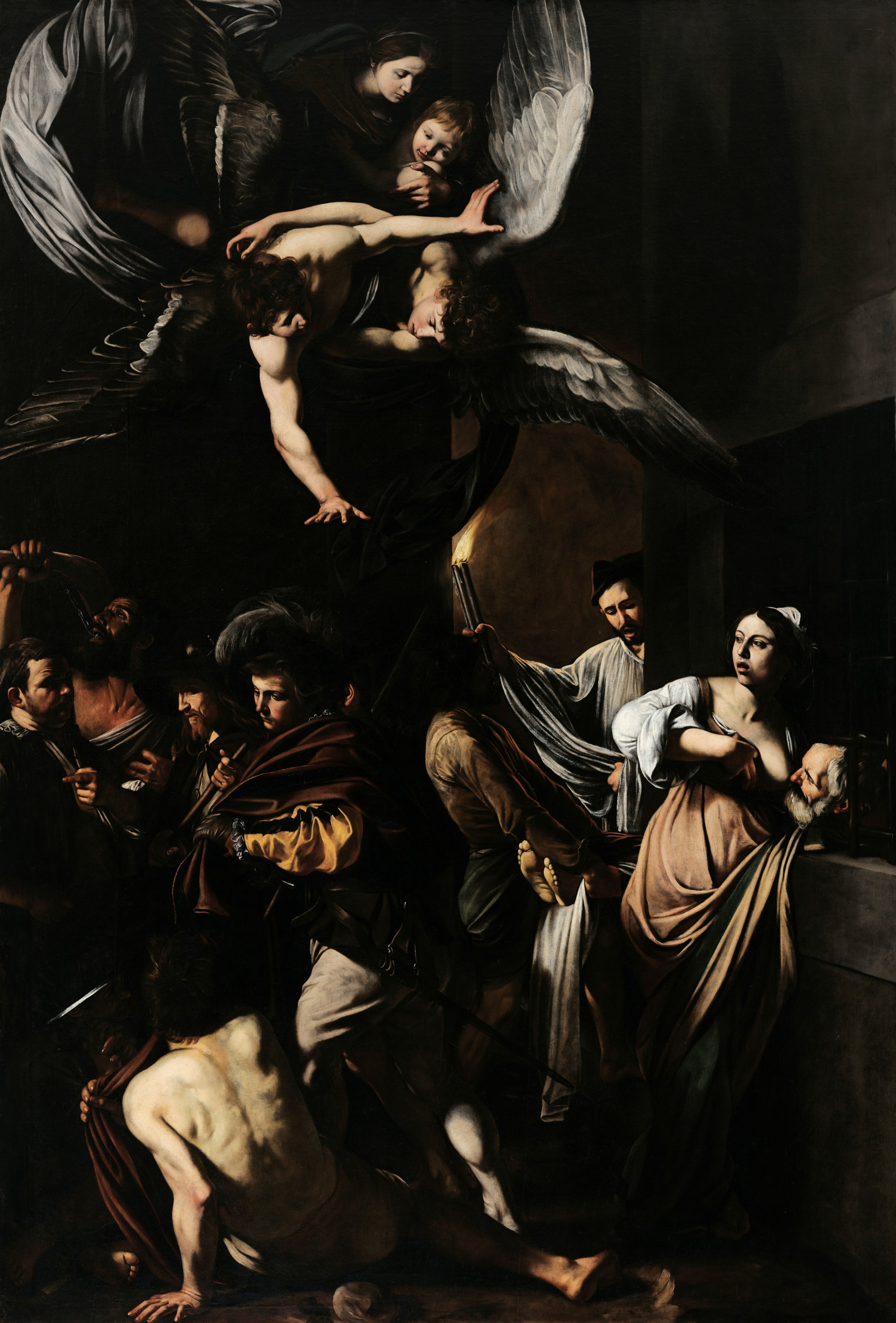
The Seven Works of Mercy by Caravaggio, 1606/07 (Naples)

The Master of Alkmaar painted the polyptych of the Seven works of mercy (c. 1504) for the Church of Saint Lawrence in Alkmaar, Netherlands. His series of wooden panel paintings show the works of mercy, with Jesus in the background viewing each, in this order: feed the hungry, give drink to the thirsty, clothe the naked, bury the dead, shelter the traveler, comfort the sick, and ransom the captive.

The painting of the Seven Works of Mercy by Frans II Francken (1605) represents the acts not as a picture cycle, but in one single composition.

A major work of the iconography of mercy is the altarpiece of Caravaggio (1606/07) in Naples, which was commissioned by the Confraternità del Pio Monte della Misericordia for their church. This charity brotherhood was founded in 1601 in Naples. The artist painted the Seven Works of Mercy in one single composition. Regarding the sharp contrasts of the painting's chiaroscuro, the art historian Ralf van Bühren explains the bright light as a metaphor for mercy, which "helps the audience to explore mercy in their own lives".

== In Methodism ==
In Methodist teaching, doing merciful acts is a prudential means of grace. Along with works of piety, works of mercy evidence growth in grace and are characteristic of those who have Christian perfection. In this sense, the Methodist concern for people at the margins is closely related to its worship. As such, these beliefs have helped create the emphasis of the social gospel in the Methodist Church.

The Methodist concept of works of mercy is drawn from the writings of John Wesley, who described them in multiple writings, among them a sermon addressing Jesus' Sermon on the Mount:

And, First, with regard to works of mercy. "Take heed," saith he,"that ye do not your alms before men, to be seen of them: Otherwise ye have no reward of your Father which is in heaven." "That ye do not your alms:" -- Although this only is named, yet is every work of charity included, every thing which we give, or speak, or do, whereby our neighbour may be profited; whereby another man may receive any advantage, either in his body or soul. The feeding the hungry, the clothing the naked, the entertaining or assisting the stranger, the visiting those that are sick or in prison, the comforting the afflicted, the instructing the ignorant, the reproving the wicked, the exhorting and encouraging the well-doer; and if there be any other work of mercy, it is equally included in this direction.

== See also ==
- Divine Mercy novena
- Holy House of Mercy
- Mercy Corps
- Our Lady of Mercy
- Seven gifts of the Holy Spirit
- Sisters of Mercy
- Tree of virtues
