= Master of Alkmaar =

Dutch painter

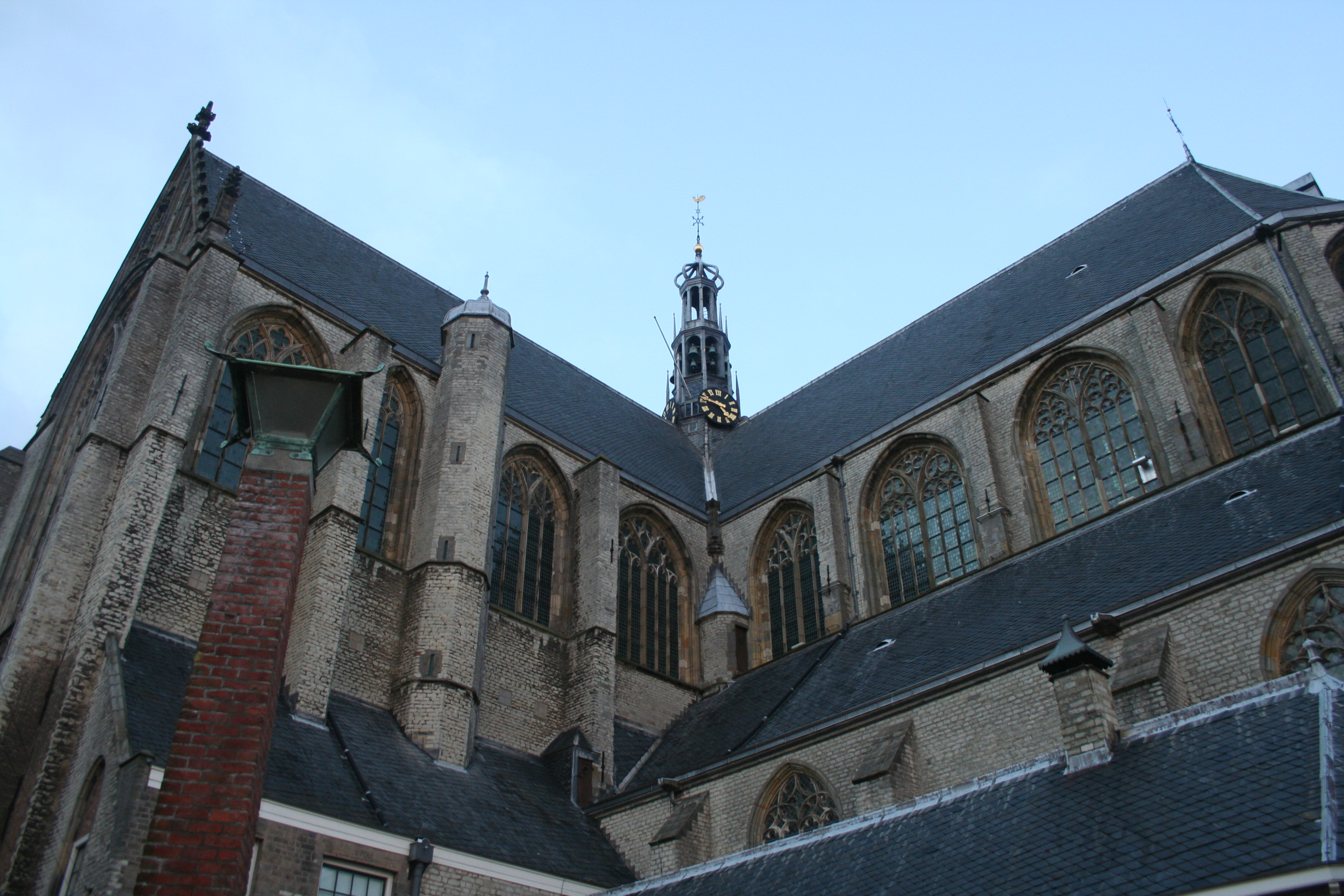
Grote or Sint-Laurenskerk (Alkmaar)

The Master of Alkmaar was a Dutch painter active around Alkmaar at the beginning of the sixteenth century. His name is derived from a series of panel paintings from the church of Saint Lawrence in that city, dated to 1504 and showing the Seven Works of Mercy; they are currently in the Rijksmuseum in Amsterdam.

The paintings, bearing the stamp of Geertgen tot Sint Jans, are done in bright colors, and their figures are drawn in an exaggeratedly caricatured manner. It has been proposed that this artist is identical to Cornelis Buys I, the brother of Jacob Cornelisz van Oostsanen; he is known to have been active in Alkmaar between 1490 and 1524. More recently, the name of Pieter Gerritsz, originally of Haarlem, has been proposed, as he was in Alkmaar beginning in 1502. This artist, in 1518, was compensated for a painting of Saint Bavo in Haarlem, and his name can be found in records of the Egmond Abbey and of the church of Saint Lawrence in Alkmaar, over a period covering the years 1515 to 1529.

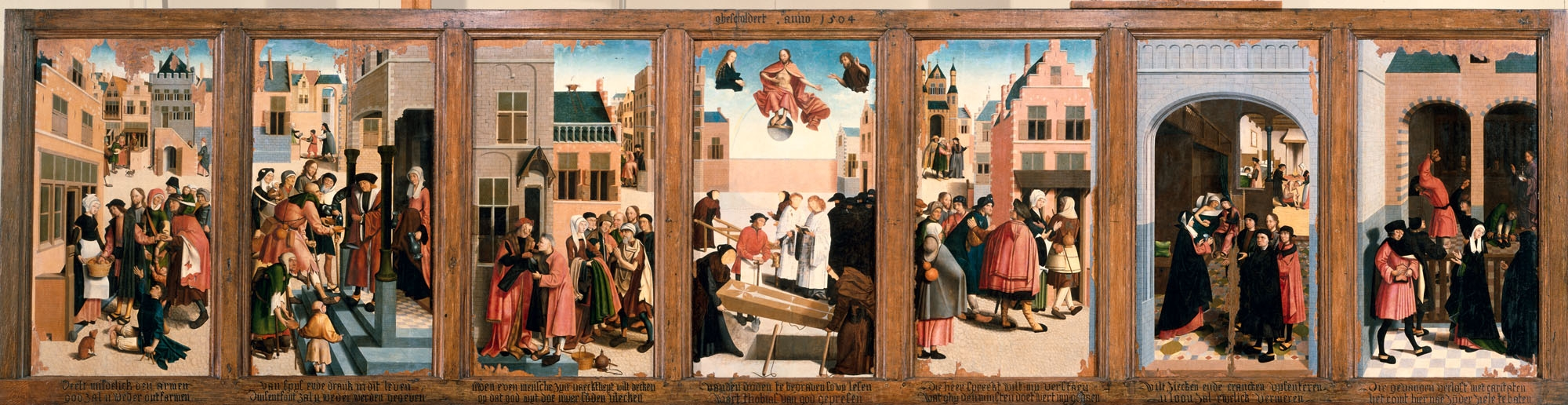
The Seven Works of Mercy, by the Master of Alkmaar in 1504, for the St. Lawrence church in Alkmaar
