= Pierre Montallier =

French painter

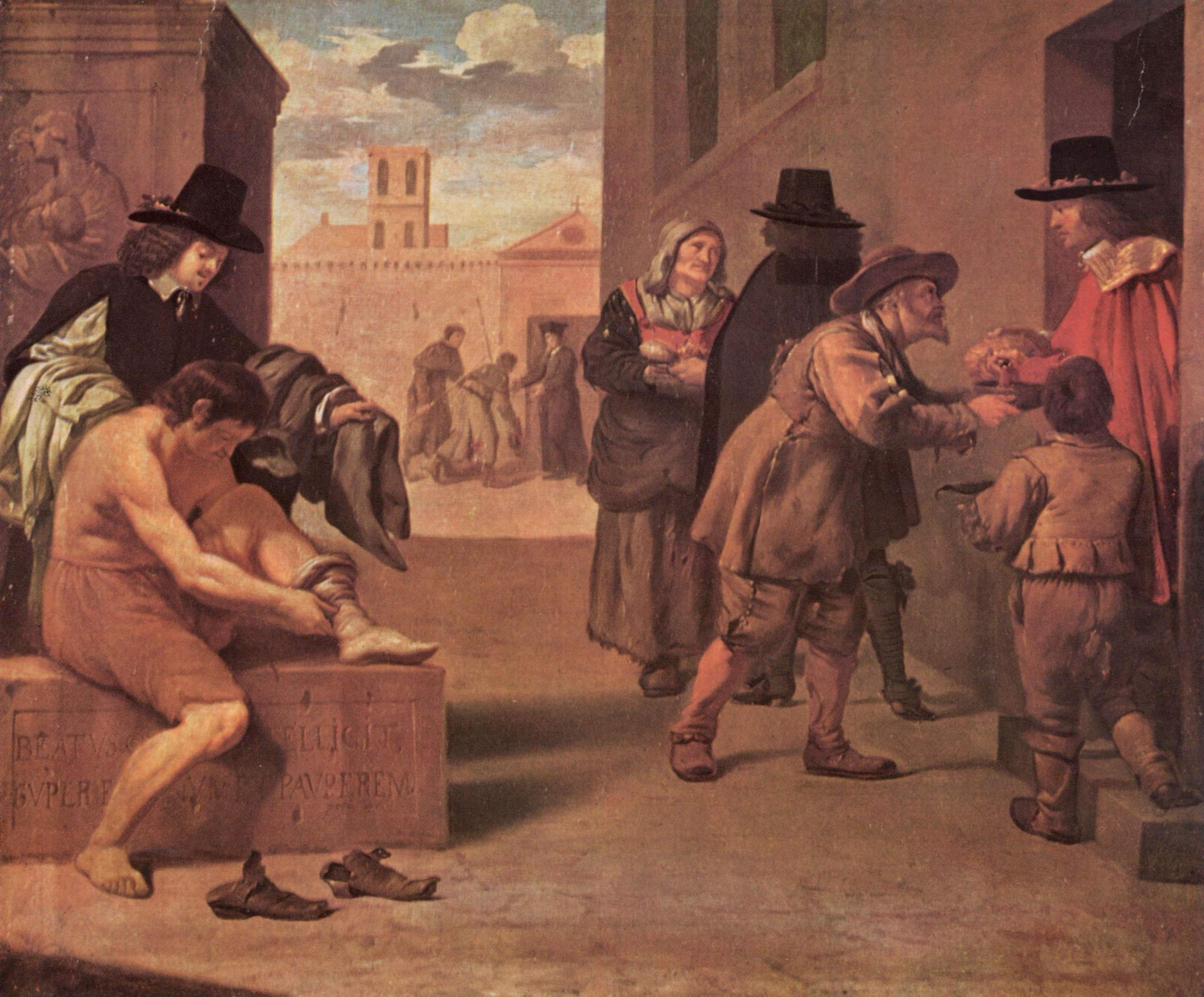
Works of Mercy by Pierre Montallier, 1680

Pierre Montallier (c. 1643 – 15 October 1697 Paris) was a French painter. He died in Paris. His most famous artwork is Works of Mercy.
