= Tree of virtues and tree of vices =

Diagrams of the relationship between virtues and vices in medieval Christianity

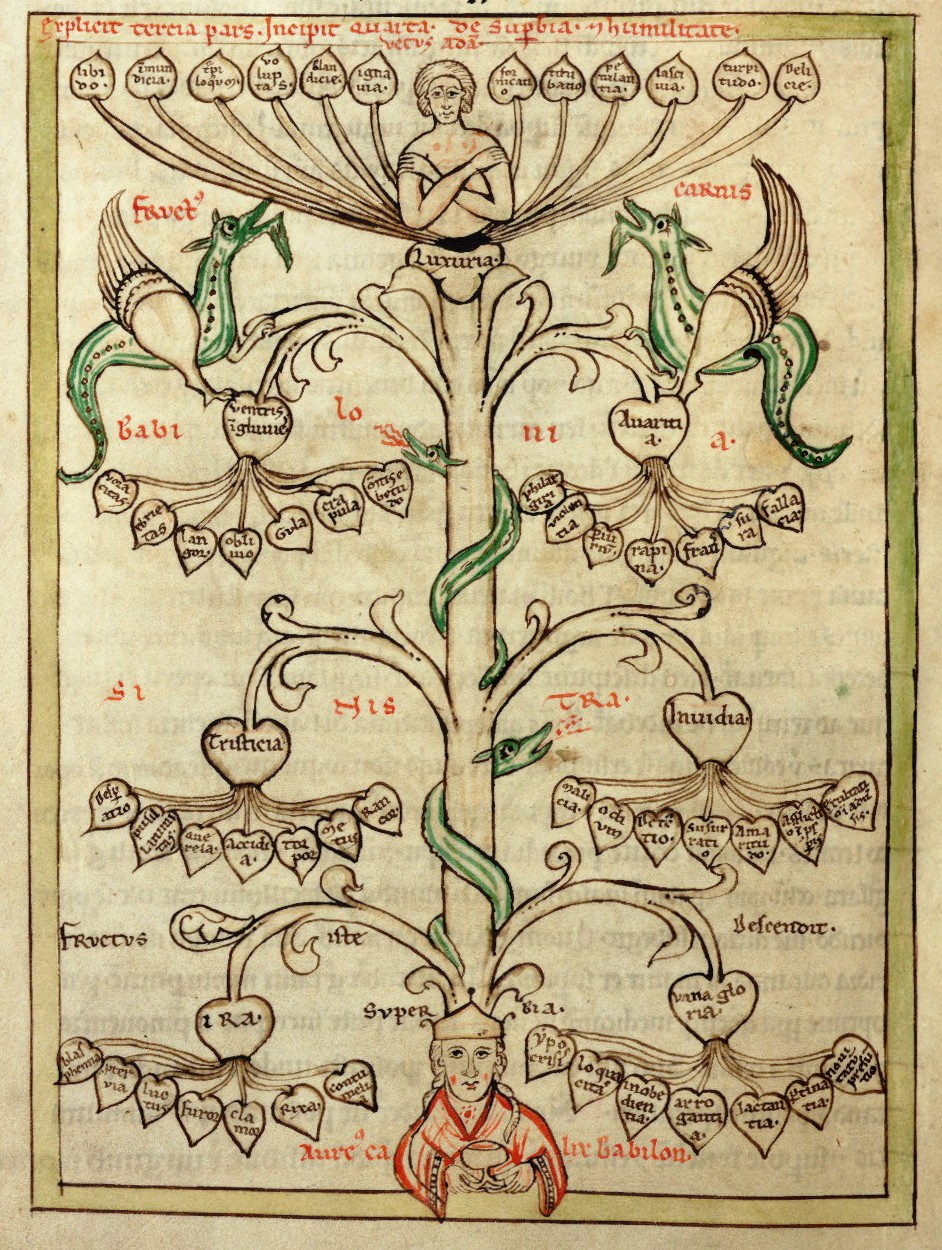
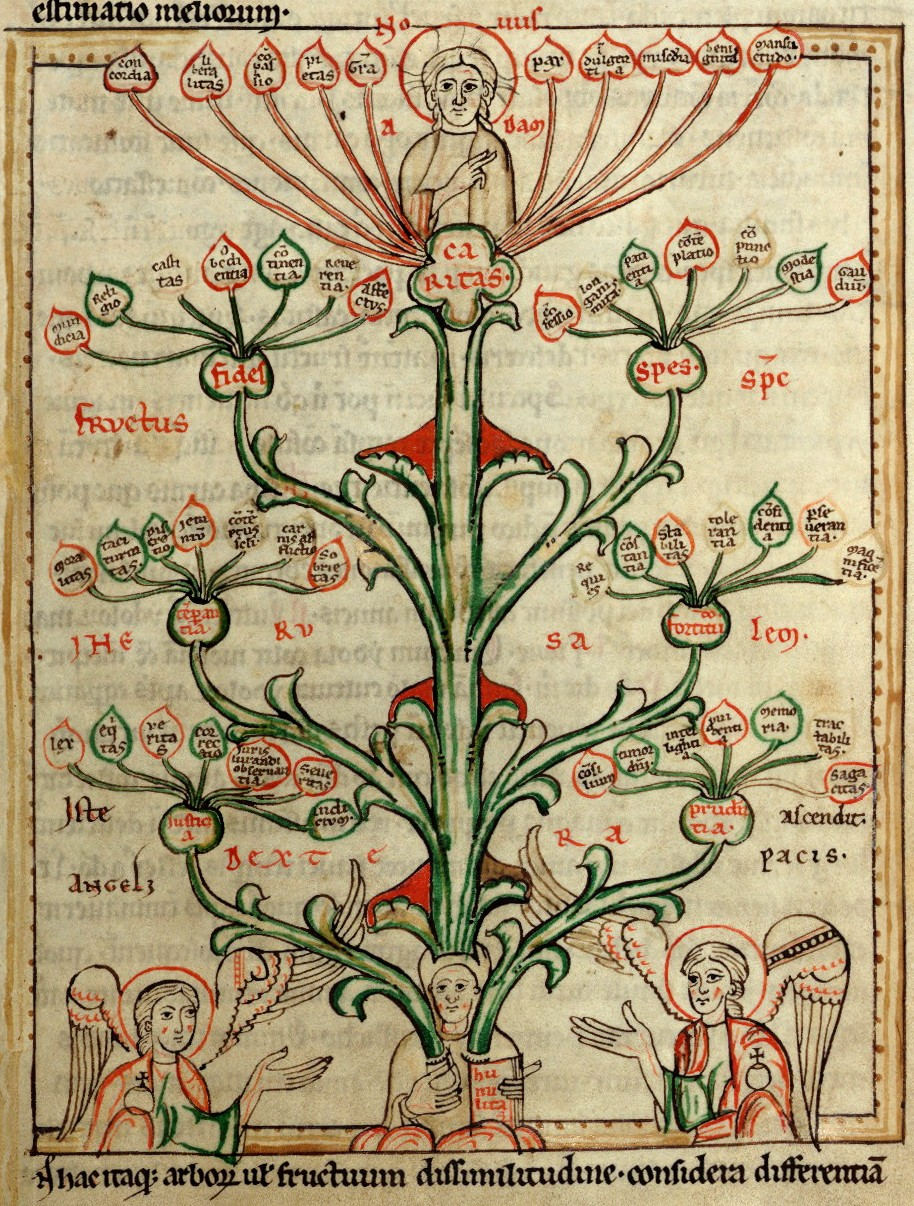
A matching pair of a tree of vices and a tree of virtues, from a manuscript of Speculum Virginum (Walters Art Museum Ms. W.72, foll. 25v & 26r, dated ca. 1200)

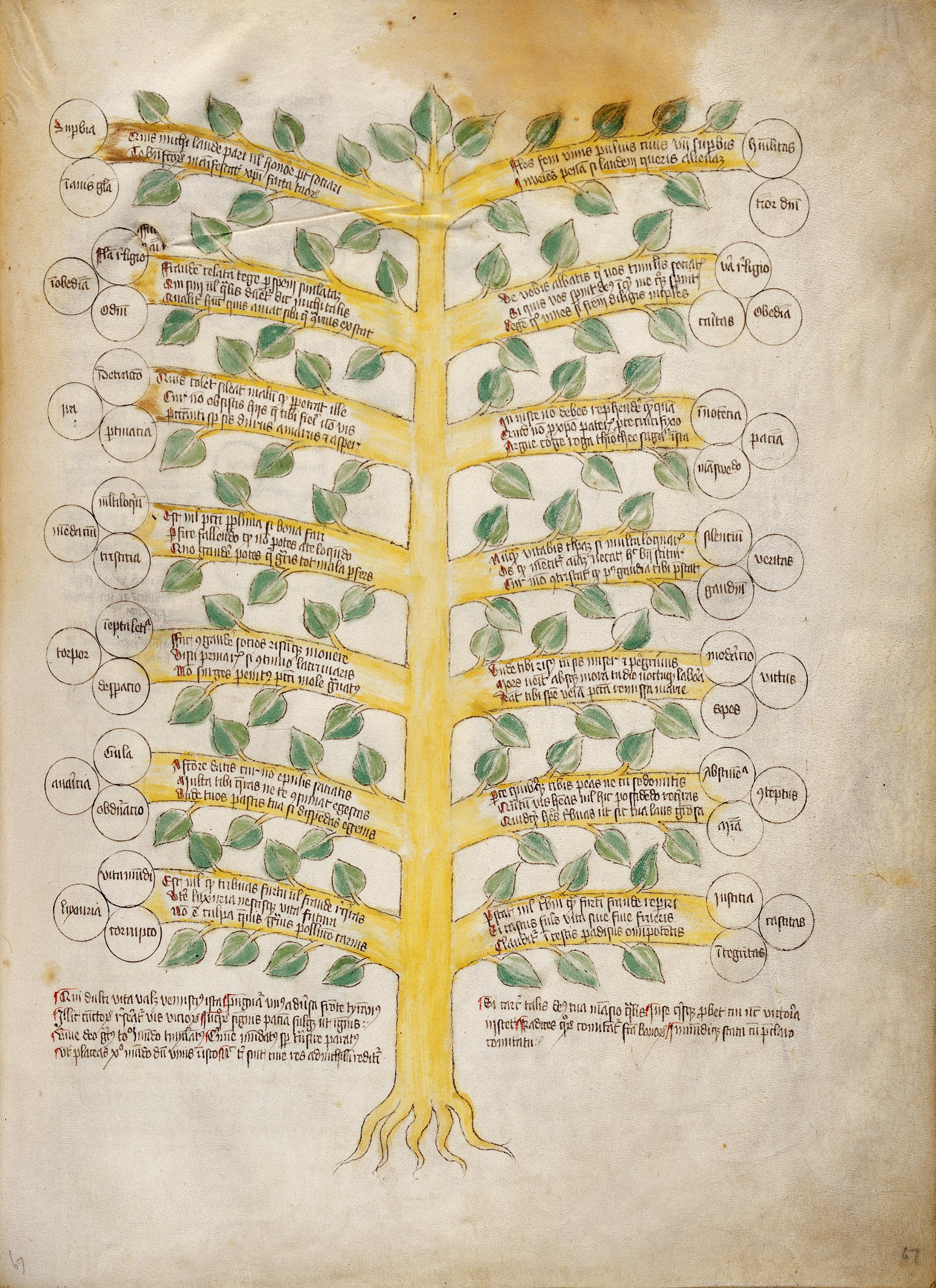
Ink and Watercolour Circa 1420-30.

A tree of virtues (arbor virtutum) is a diagram used in medieval Christian tradition to display the relationships between virtues, usually juxtaposed with a tree of vices (arbor vitiorum) where the vices are treated in a parallel fashion. Together with genealogical trees, these diagrams qualify as among the earliest explicit tree-diagrams in history, emerging in the High Middle Ages.

At first appearing as illustrations in certain theological tracts, the concept becomes more popular in the Late Middle Ages and is also seen in courtly manuscripts such as the psalter of Robert de Lisle (c. 1310-1340).

The nodes of the tree-diagrams are the Cardinal Virtues and the Cardinal Vices, respectively, often culminating with the Theological Virtues and Vices, each with a number of secondary virtues or secondary vices shown as leaves of the respective nodes. While on a tree of virtues, the leaves point upward toward heaven, on a tree of vices the leaves point downward toward hell. At the root of the trees, the virtues of humilitas "humility" and the vice of superbia "pride" is shown as the origin of all other virtues and vices, respectively. By this time, the concept of showing hierarchical concepts of medieval philosophy in diagrams also becomes more widespread. E.g. ms. Arsenal 1037 (14th century) has a tree of virtue on fol. 4v and a tree of vices on fol. 5r as part of a collection of diagrams on a variety of topics. In this example, the trees are also further subdivided into a ternary structure, as follows:

- humilitas radix virtutum
  - I. prudentia (seven sub-virtues)
  - II. fortitudo (seven sub-virtues)
  - semita vitalis
    - III. iustitia (seven sub-virtues)
    - IIII. temperantia (seven sub-virtues)
    - fructus spiritus
      - V. fides (seven sub-virtues)
      - VI. spes (seven sub-virtues)
      - VII. caritas (seven sub-virtues)
- superbia radix vitiorum
  - I. avaritia (seven sub-vices)
  - II. invidia (seven sub-vices)
  - semita mortis
    - III. inanis gloria (seven sub-vices)
    - IIII. ira (seven sub-vices)
    - fructus carnis
      - V. gula (seven sub-vices)
      - VI. acedia (seven sub-vices)
      - VII. luxuria (seven sub-vices)

In the Italian Renaissance, Pietro Bembo developed a similar flow-chart-like "moral schema" of sins punished in Dante's Inferno and Purgatory.

== See also ==
- Seven Virtues
- Seven Cardinal Sins
- Works of Mercy
- Tree of Jesse
