= Waag (Alkmaar) =

Listed building in Netherlands, site of annual cheese market

Coordinates: 52.6314°N 4.7503°E

Waag, Alkmaar
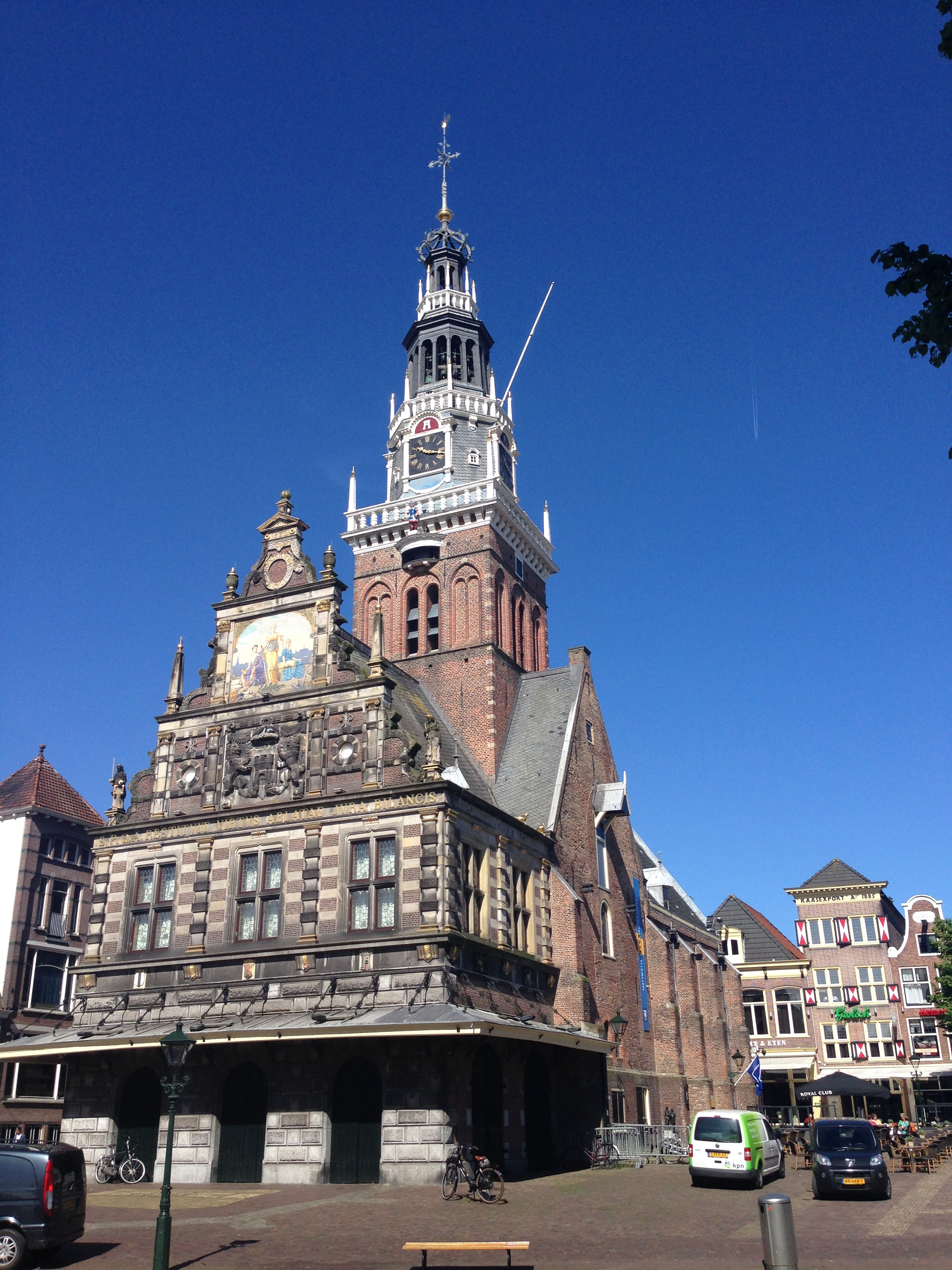
- Alkmaar - Waag (Weigh building) on the square Waagplein.
- Interactive map of the Waag, Alkmaar area
- Alternative names: Weigh house tower

General information
- Type: Carillon tower - Weigh house
- Architectural style: partly Renaissance style.
- Location: Alkmaar, North Holland, Waagplein 2
- Completed: 1603
- Owner: Gemeente Alkmaar

Design and construction
- Architect: C.W. Royaards (1960s restoration)

The Waag building is a National monument (Rijksmonument) listed building on the Waagplein in Alkmaar in the Netherlands. On this square Waagplein every Friday from April till the second week of September, the famous cheese market is held. The Dutch Cheese Museum and the tourist information Office (VVV) are also in the building. In the tower is a famous carillon weekly played by a carillonneur and also automatically by a drum chiming the quarters of the hour. There is also the famous automatic horse with knights play in the tower with an automatic trumpetplayer.

== History ==
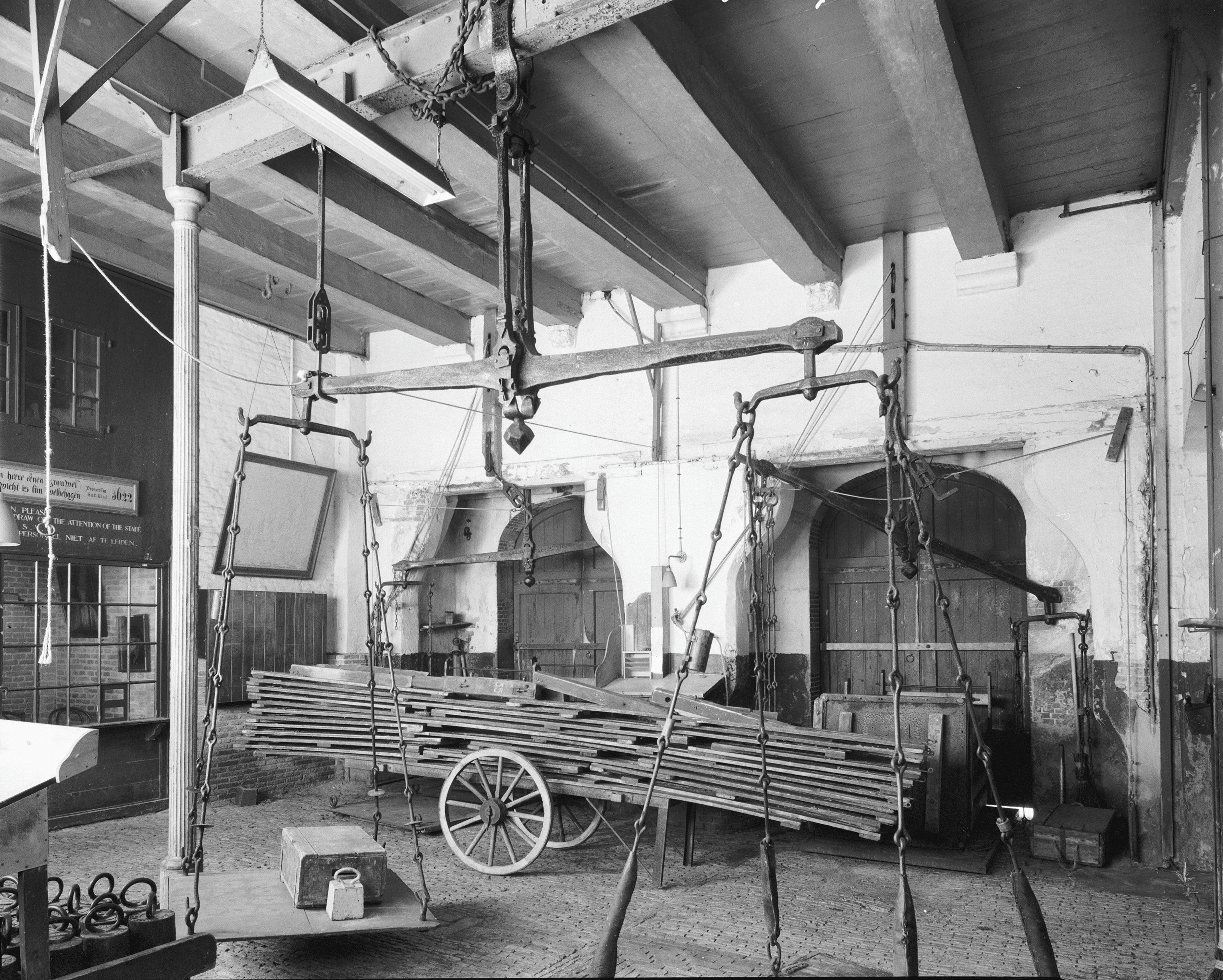
The balance scales inside the weigh house - Alkmaar

The Waag (balance scale) building has an interesting history dating back to the 14th century. In that period it was built as a chapel for the adjacent Holy Spirit hospital where poor travelers could get free accommodation for three days and nights. Also the sick were nursed in this hospital. In 1566 the Bishop of Haarlem gave permission to the Holy Spirit hospital to re-purpose the hospital building for weighing. In 1582, the weighing activities were moved to the larger Holy Spirit Chapel, which by then was no longer being used for divine services.

== Cheese market (Kaasmarkt) ==
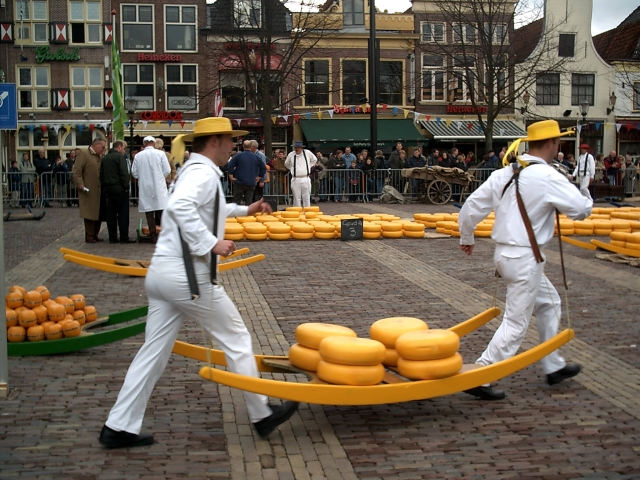
Cheese market on the Waagplein

The weekly cheese market is held near the weighing building, where Edam and Gouda cheeses were traditionally sold. Today, the cheese market is a show put on for tourists from around the world, rather than an active center of trade in cheese. For the tourists there is also other merchandise for sale on the market along the nearby canal called Mient.

== The Conversion to Weigh house ==
The conversion of the chapel to the weighing house, which involved reducing the exterior of the building somewhat, was completed in 1583. The choir of the chapel was removed and a richly decorated façade in Renaissance style was made. Today the contours of the former choir can be seen in the pavement next to the facade. (The current façade, closely following the original design, dates from 1884.) In 1597–1603, the original tower was replaced by a much larger one (the present Waagtoren).

== Latin proverb ==
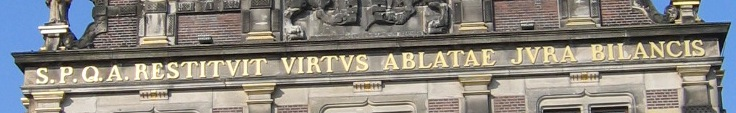
Proverb on the façade "SPQA RESTITVIT VIRTVS ABLATAE JVRA BILANCIS".

Atop the façade of the building is the Latin proverb: "SPQA RESTITVIT VIRTVS ABLATAE JVRA BILANCIS". This means : SPQA (Senatus PopulusQue Alkmaris - Council and People of Alkmaar) by virtue of its courage and strength, restored the rights to the balance to the people and government of Alkmaar." This refers to a battle against Spanish Roman Catholics, which, upon the truce of October 8, 1573, established the rights of the citizens to have a weigh house.

== The Carillon and other bells ==
=== Situation today ===
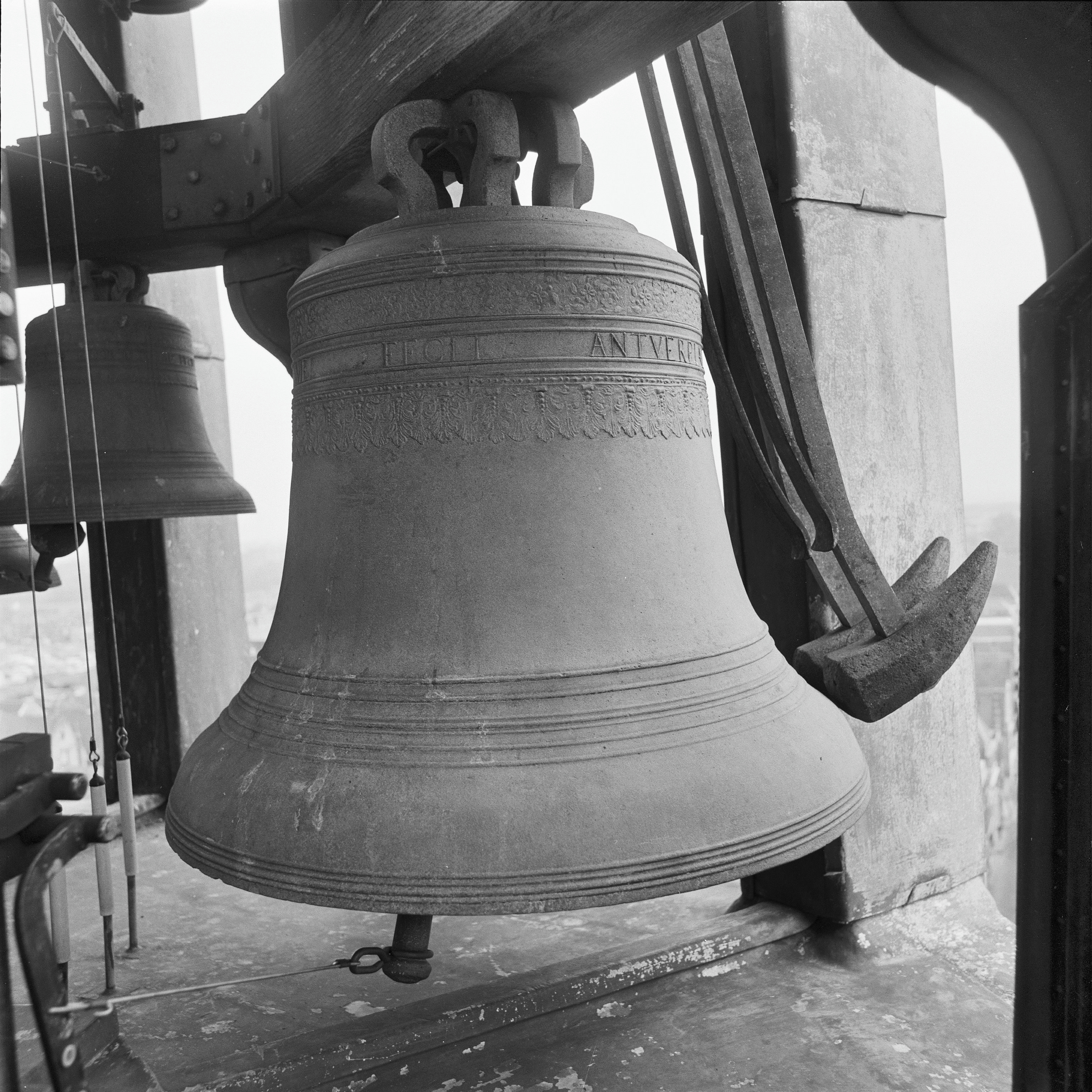
A bell by Melchior de Haze in the carillon

- The tower contains a carillon, installed originally by Melchior de Haze from Antwerp, cast in 1688. Over the years, the majority of the bells deteriorated due to air pollution, to the point that only the largest nine bells were still usable. From that basis, a new carillon was installed, with the remaining bells (bringing it to a total of 47 bells) cast by Royal Eijsbouts, of Asten, The Netherlands in 1967. The largest bell (keyed as low "c") is an e-flat, weighing approximately 1375 kg. The range from there continues through f and g, thereafter chromatic to an e-flat four octaves higher than the largest (de Haze) bell. The historic meantone tuning has been retained.
- Also hanging in the top of the tower is a condemned de Haze bell from nearby St. Laurens Church (Grote Kerk, or Great Church, also in Alkmaar), which serves only as decoration today.
- In the room beneath the clockwork hangs the "gate bell", cast by Henrick Wegewaert of Kampen in 1616, with an average diameter of 124 cm. Originally, it was used as a signal to indicate that the city gates were about to be closed for the night, or opened in the morning.

=== History ===
Prior to the installation of the de Haze carillon, the earlier, smaller turret on the roof of the chapel held an 11-bell chime by Jacob Waghevens, of Mechelen, Belgium from the 1540s. Over time, seven more bells were added by other founders, and a baton keyboard, similar to that found on other carillons in the Netherlands, was built. At that time, the art of tuning bells effectively had not yet been developed, so the pitch and tuning of most bells was therefore very rough. (One may hear such a set of bells still today at the "speeltoren" in Monnickendam.) After the Hemony brothers mastered the art of tuning bells in the 1640s in Zutphen (and later in Amsterdam), Alkmaar also sought to obtain a well-tuned set of bells. Nearby cities of Enkhuizen, Haarlem and Amsterdam had already done this. Pieter Hemony was summoned to propose a new carillon in 1671, but the city authorities were unwilling to agree to Hemony's demand that the bars enclosing the belfry be removed to allow the sound to carry better into the square. After Pieter Hemony died in 1680 (his brother having preceded him in death), successor (and cousin) of the Hemony's, Claude Fremy was hired to build a carillon of 35 bells, in the process melting down the old bells to provide some of the metal for the new ones. The committee inspecting the bells several times, rejected Fremy's bells, which were very poorly tuned, and he was obliged to repay the city for the value of the bronze used. In the same time Willem Spraackel the clockmaker from Haarlem built the ironwork in the carillon and the new drum.

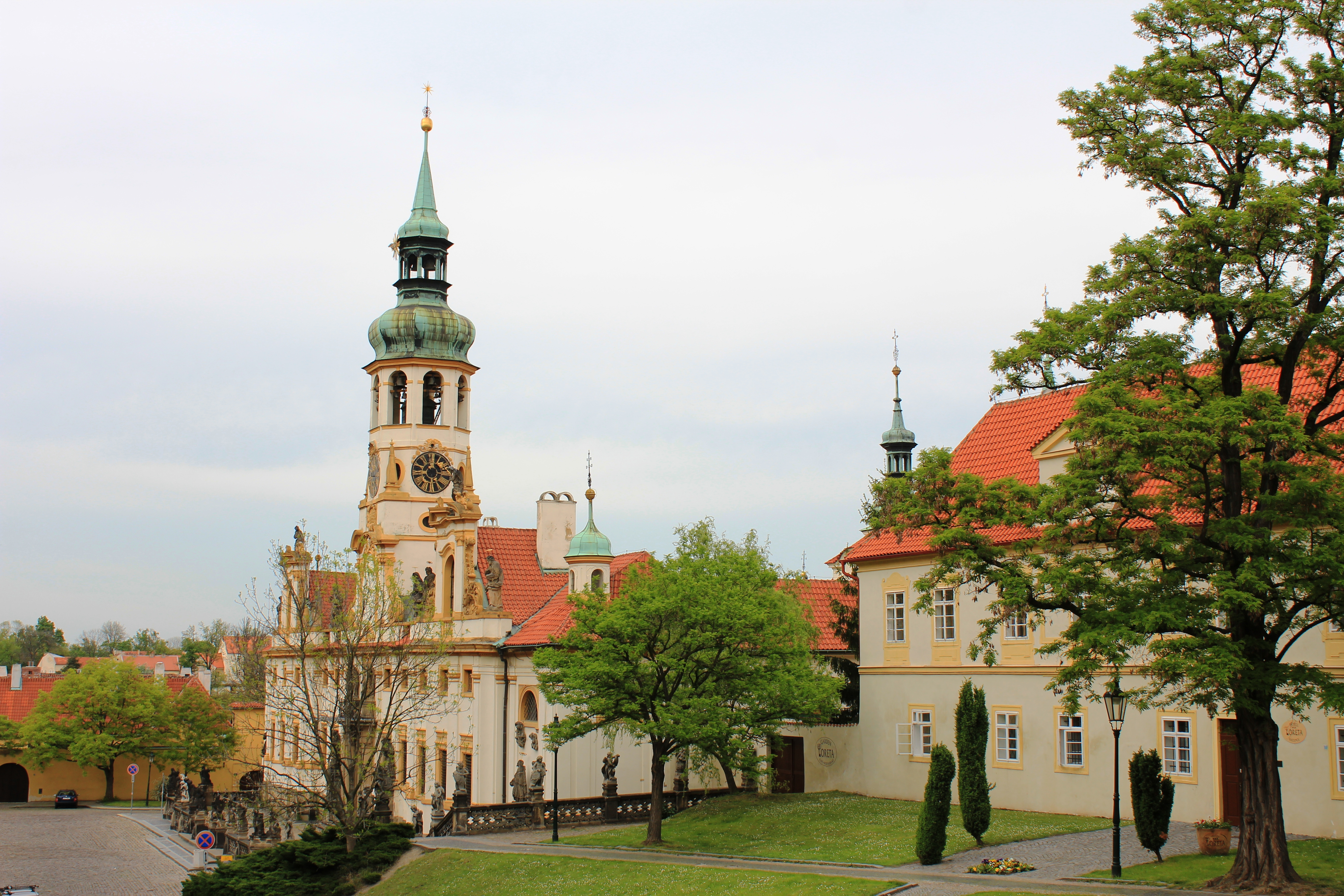
Loreto convent with in this tower some of the in Alkmaar refused bells by Claude Fremy installed in 1699

Part of the Alkmaar bells still consists. Some of the bells that had been made for Alkmaar Weigh house and for the Hague st. Jacobtower (Grote Kerk) are today present in the old carillon by Claude Fremy in the tower of the Loreto convent in Prague in the Czech Republic. It was purchased in Amsterdam in 1695 by Eberhard de Glauchov, a merchant from Prague.

After the affair with Claude Fremy the city took the advice of Willem Spraackel and David Slechtenhorst carillonneur of Leiden, who had already advised and worked for the Hague on a new carillon by Melchior de Haze from Antwerp. Spraackel advised to contact de Haze. The committee from Alkmaar asked Willem Spraackel also if bells from another founder would fit the already-made ironwork. It was not a problem because de Haze matched the specifications previously met by Fremy and set by Pierre Hemony. So Melchior de Haze cast a three octave 35 bells carillon in the standard meantone tuning of the day. The bells were judged in Antwerp by David Slegtenhorst, Cornelis van Neck carillonneur and organist in Hoorn, Gerard van der With the carillonneur of Alkmaar and a bell expert from Haastrecht (near Gouda) Jacob Claren. The bells were approved and shipped directly to Alkmaar. On 26 October 1688 at 3pm Gerard van der With performed his music on the de Haze bells for the first time. However, there was some dissatisfaction with the sound of the small bells so that in 1689 de Haze recast and replaced 6 small bells. The carillon persisted in this form into the 20th century.

=== The carillon after 1900 ===
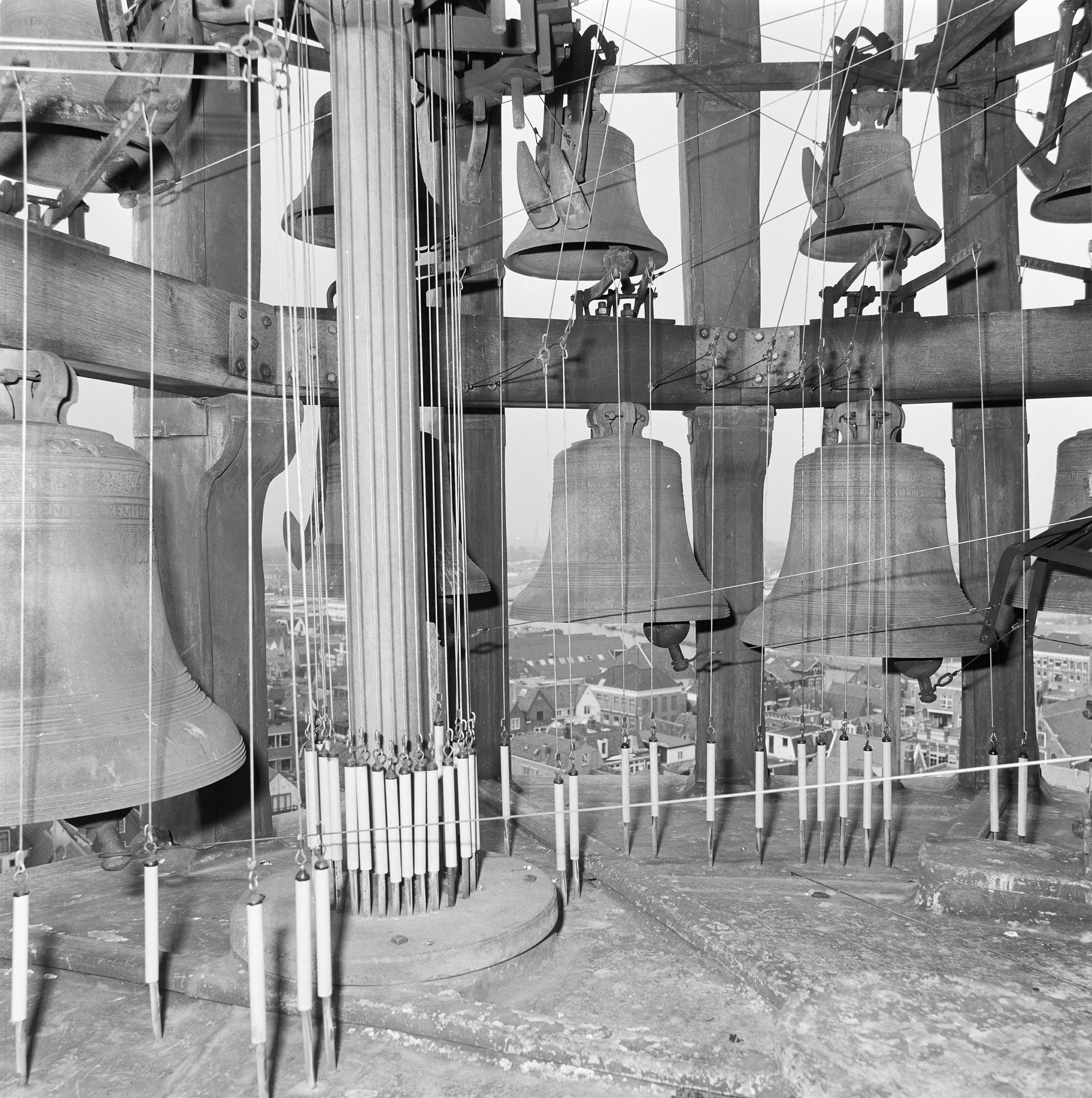
The new bells by Eijsbouts. Hammers for the drum and clappers for the baton keyboard

Around 1900 two bells in the carillon were cracked; one of these was recast by bell founder van Bergen from Midwolda (Groningen), and another bell was welded. The result was not satisfactory, so Eijsbouts replaced them in 1926 with bells cast by Taylor from Loughborough England. Still the bells were not satisfactory, and, after repairs in 1948 by a clockmaker named van de Kerkhof and in 1953 again by Eijsbouts, it was around 1960 that was decided to tackle the carillon in a better way. This meant more or less the end of the Historic Waag Carillon as we saw earlier. Between 2006 and 2013 big repair works were done to the 'Waagtoren' and the carillon. For example: The automatic drum got a more efficient wiring to the hammers on the bells, which created more space round the baton keyboard and the attics in between.

=== The disapproved bells in Alkmaar de Haze carillons ===
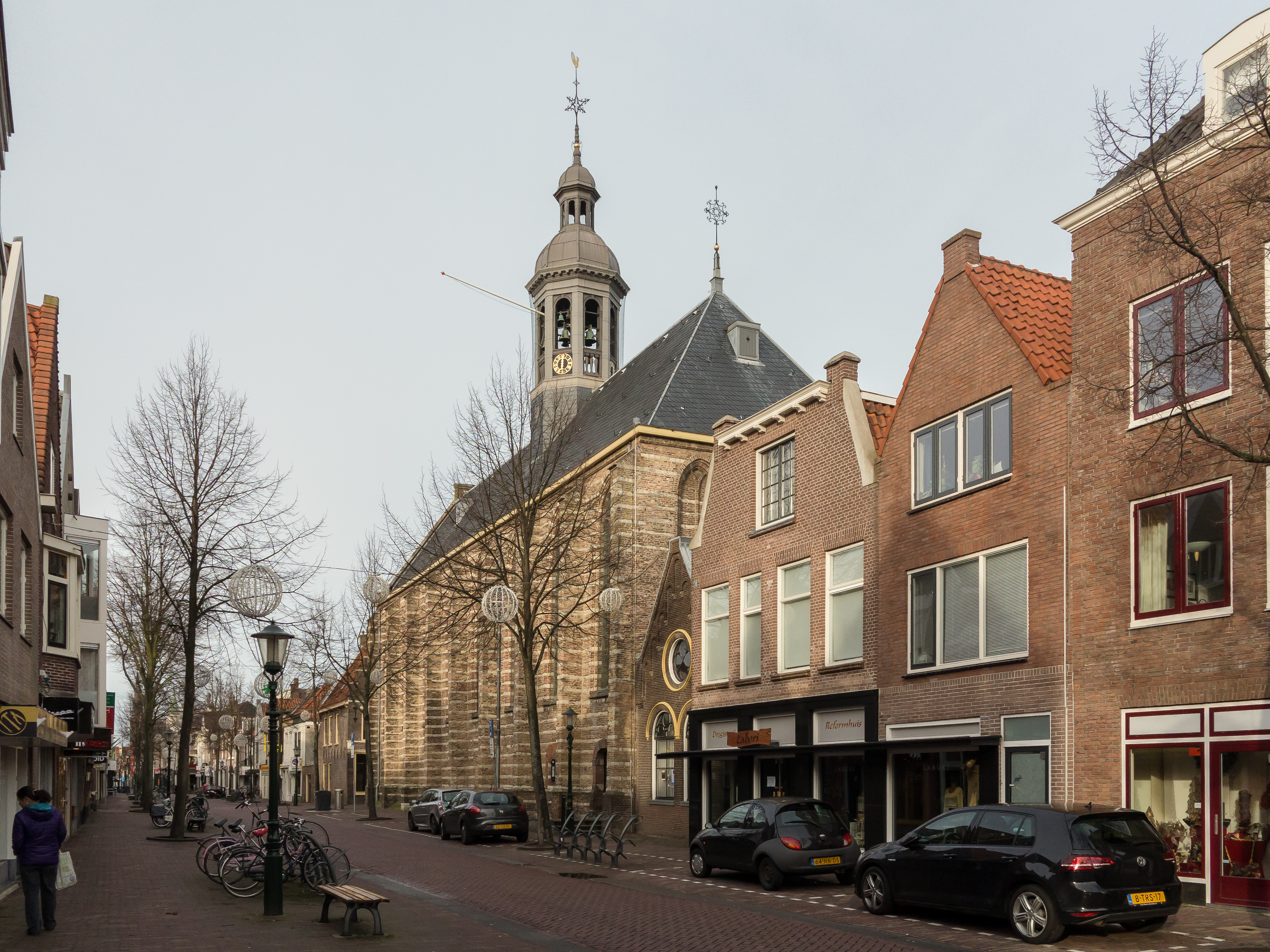
Alkmaar, de Kapelkerk with in the tower the disapproved bells

Twelve historic disapproved bells from the 'Waagtoren' are used in the turret at the Great (St. Laurens) Church (Grote Kerk) to replace bells with less quality. The two Taylor bells and 21 bells by the Haze from the 'Waagtoren' and the Great church play on a new drum in the turret of the 'Kapelkerk' (Chapel Church on the Laat). This drum is put into operation by the historic clock. So Alkmaar has three carillons related to de Haze. Except in the 'Kapelkerk' also provided with a baton keyboard. The last restoration took into account that a keyboard can be placed in the Kapelkerk turret. But the money for this was missing in 2005. Some donated new bells have been cast and hung to complete already.

=== The Clock and Drum ===
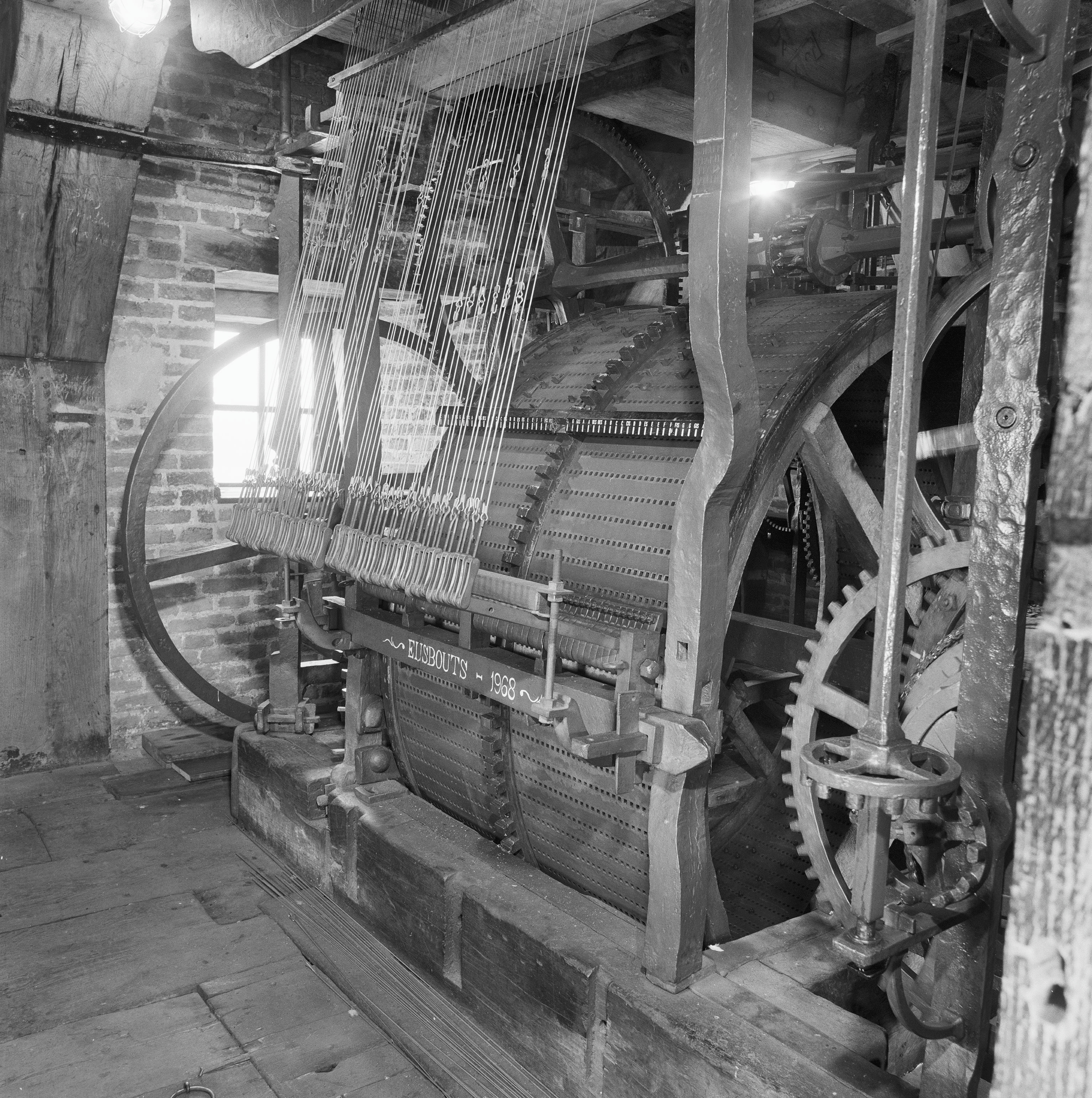
Speeltrommel constructed by Willem Spraackel

The clock with Gothic angle pillars was made in 1541. The drum (big music cylinder) part of the clock was built in the enlarged frame by Willem Spraackel round 1690. It chimes every quarter of the hour with on half and full hour the full strike on lowest bell, the bourdon of the carillon. (half full strike on a large smaller bell) this is called 'Hollandse slag' (Dutch strike). In 1690 the clock was changed into one with a pendulum an invention by Christiaan Huygens around this time. The drum plays a short melody on the four quarters of all hours of the natural day. This has been a tradition in Alkmaar since first bells were hang on the towers in the 1540s. Also in the night man had to be able to hear what time it was. The city carillonneur changes the melodies on the drum twice a year. This is called 'versteken' (remove and insertion of the pins which lift the hammers on the bells).

=== Trumpet Player with little barrel organ ===
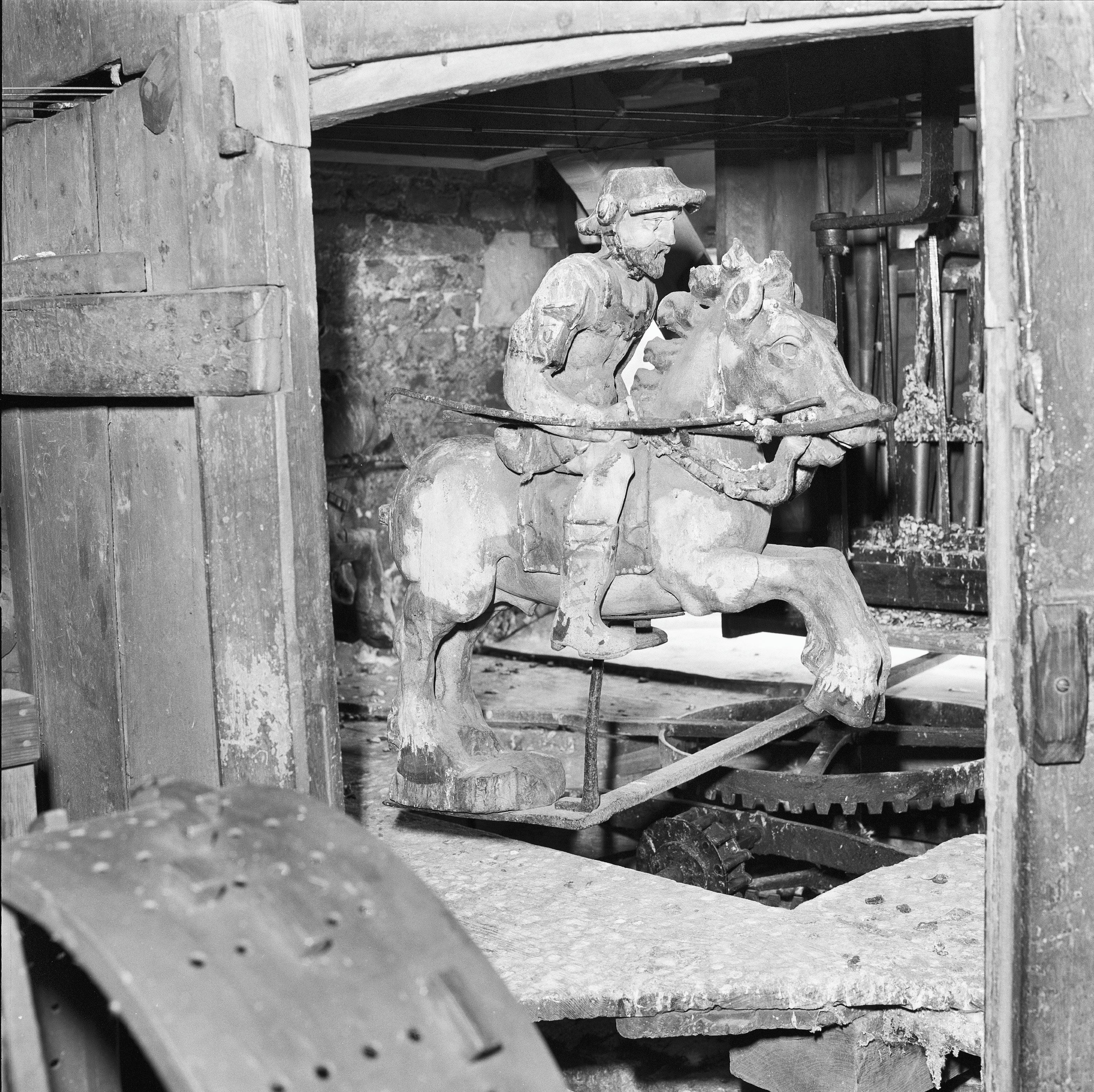
Horse with knight playing every hour a battle

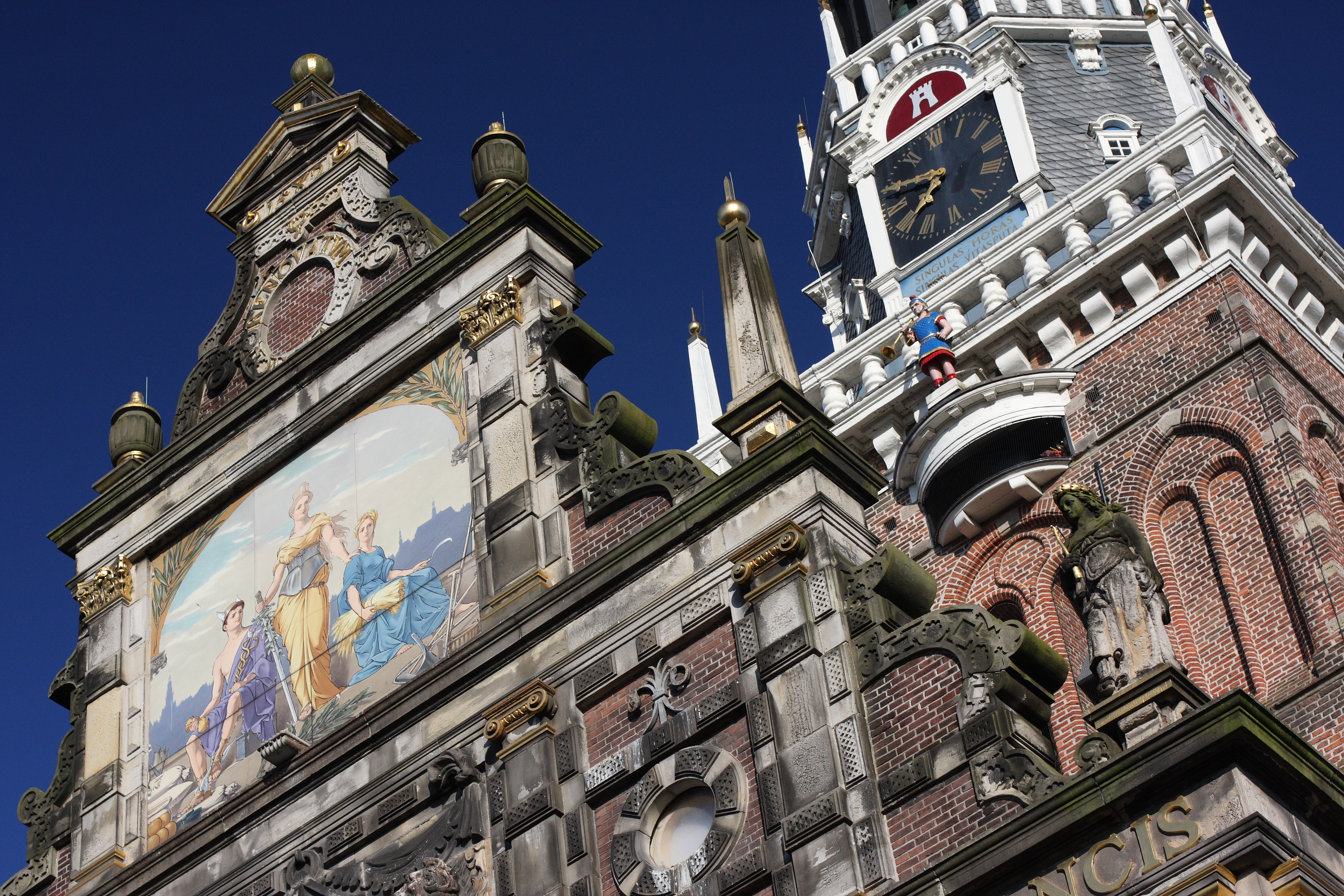
Waag with the horses and trumpeter

Famous in this tower is also a so-called 'ruiterspel'. Riders on horseback perform during the striking of the hour a battle game while a wooden trumpeter blows his trumpet above it. Several times a day he plays an automatic melody after the full hour strike. The trumpet sound comes automatically from a small drum playing on a small reed organ directed from the clock and installed behind the riders on horse back. Because of changing in temperature the little organ must be regularly tuned by the city carillonneur of Alkmaar. For this the organ has double pipes for every tone. Labial and reed pipes. The melody played by the organ for the trumpet player comes from a little drum and can get a new melody in the same way as the big carillon drum.

=== Concerts on the carillon ===
Weekly performing by the city carillonneur on the carillon is held throughout the year on Saturday mornings from 11 am to noon. Furthermore, from April till second week in October during the cheese market on Friday 09:15 am to 09:45 am, 10:45 am to 11:00 am and 11:45 am to noon. Since 2009, Christiaan Winter is appointed city carillonneur by the municipality of Alkmaar. In the summer there are also concerts by guest carillonneurs on Wednesdays at 4 pm.

== See also ==
- 16th-century Western domes
