= Grote or Sint-Laurenskerk (Alkmaar) =

Coordinates: 52°37′57″N 4°44′38″E

- Sint-Laurenskerk, Alkmaar; Grote Kerk
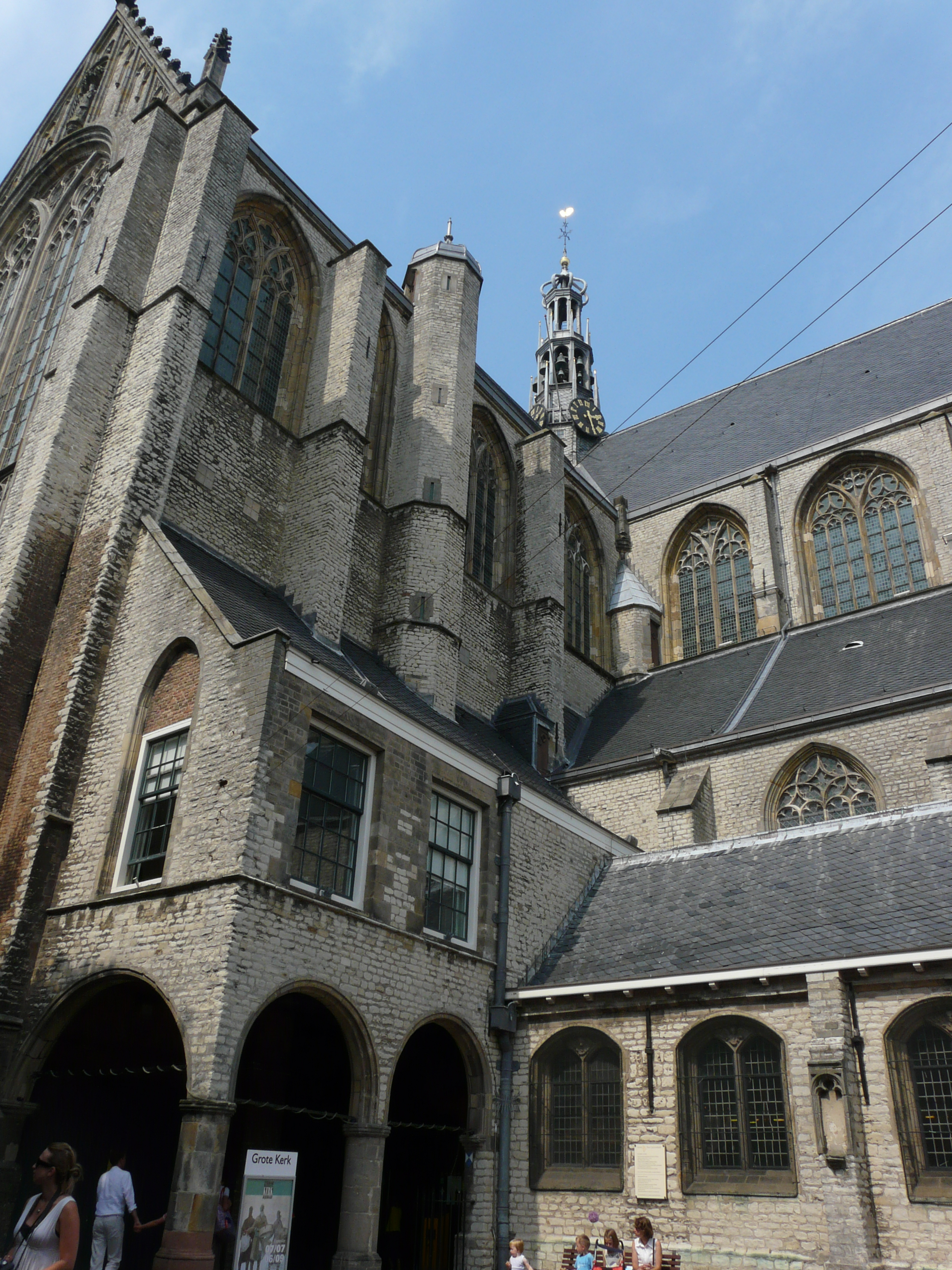
- Grote or Sint-Laurenskerk
- Location: Alkmaar, North Holland
- Address: Koorstraat 2
- Country: Netherlands
- Denomination: Protestant Church in the Netherlands
- Previous denomination: Catholic
- Website: http://www.grotekerk-alkmaar.nl/

History
- Status: Church
- Dedication: Saint Lawrence

Architecture
- Functional status: Museum
- Architect: Andries I Keldermans
- Style: Brabantine Gothic
- Years built: 1470–1518

Specifications
- Materials: Brick; Gobertange

Rijksmonument
- Official name: Koorstraat 2, 1811 GP te Alkmaar
- Designated: 10 December 1969
- Reference no.: 7258

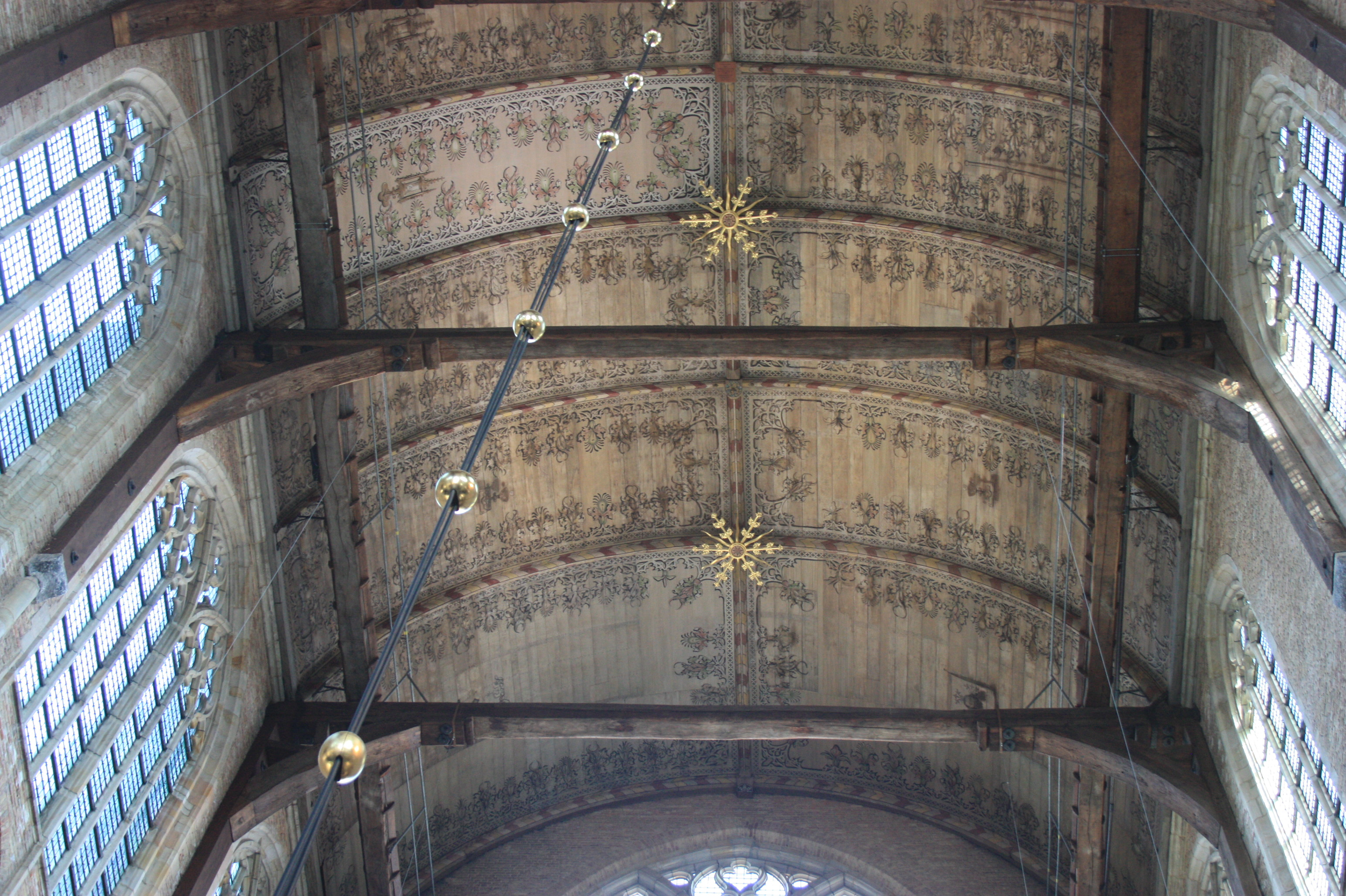
Ceiling, Grote Kerk, Alkmaar

Grote or Sint-Laurenskerk (English: Great, or St. Lawrence church) is a Reformed Protestant church in Alkmaar, Netherlands. At present, it is not used for church services; it is mostly closed in the winter and open for tourists in the summer months or by appointment. The building is located on the Koorstraat (choir street).

== History ==
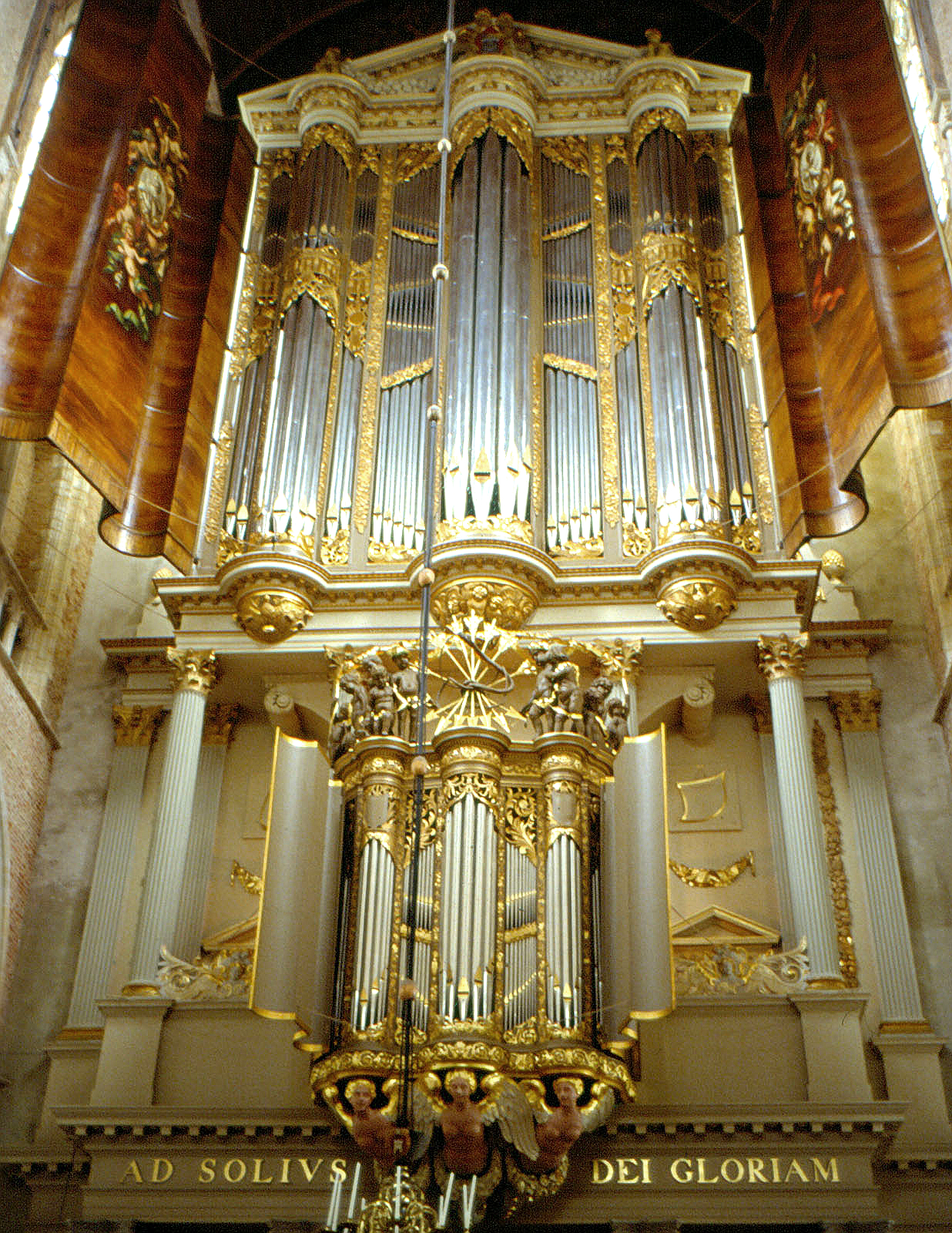
Organ

The Grote Kerk (1470–1498), dedicated to St Lawrence, is a handsome building and contains the tomb of Floris V, Count of Holland (d. 1296), a brass of 1546, and some paintings (1507). Anna Visscher is buried in this church.

The church was designed by Anthonius Keldermans (c. 1440–1512), from a church building family from Mechelen.

== Organs ==
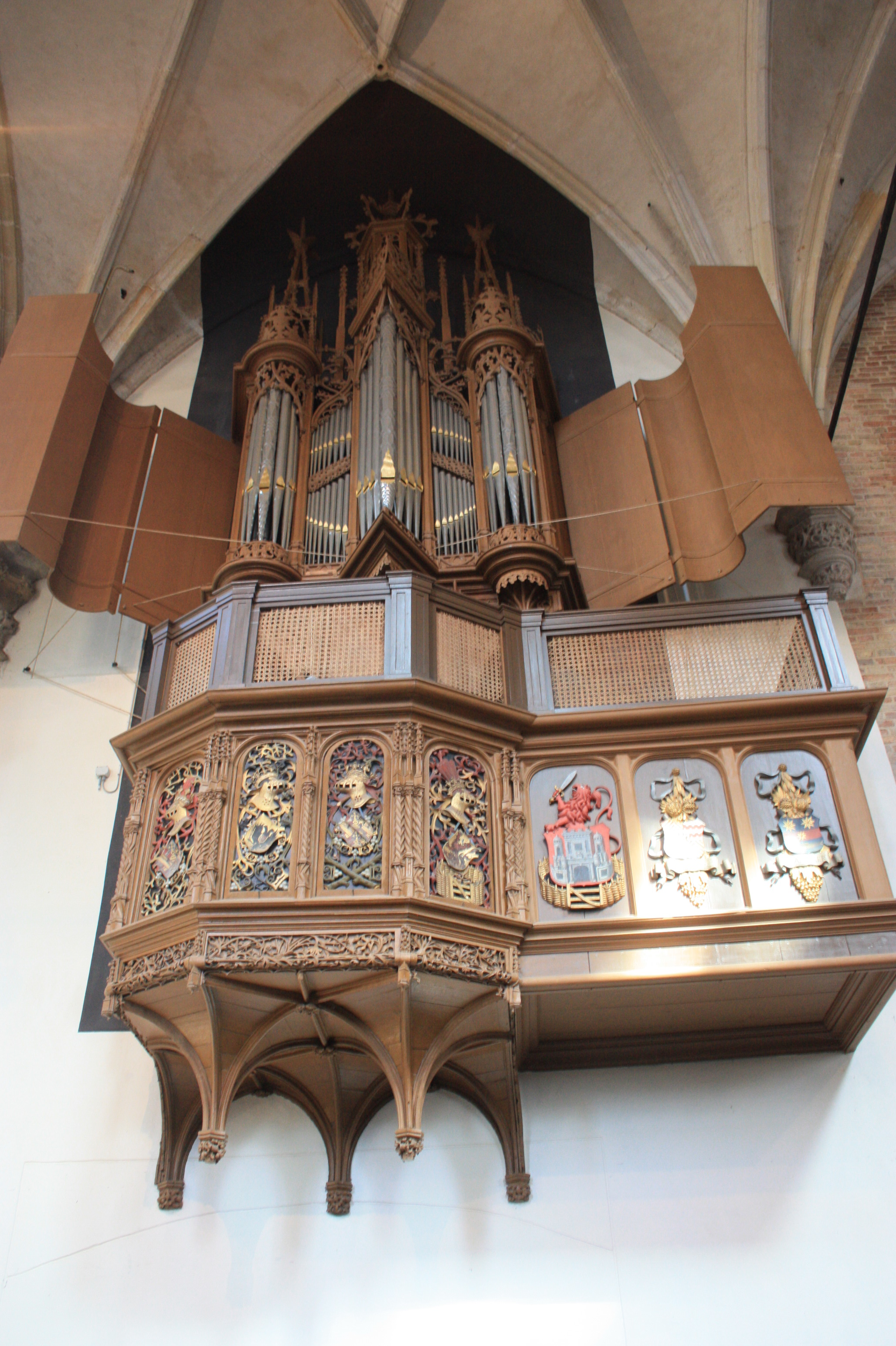
Koororgel, Grote Kerk, Alkmaar

The church contains two organs, one on the north side and one at the west end. The smaller one, called the "Koororgel" (choir organ), was built in 1511 by Jan van Covelens, and is built against the north wall of the church. It is the oldest playable organ in the Netherlands. The larger organ at the west end of the church was built by Jacobus Caltus van Hagerbeer, finished in 1645. The magnificent casework, which unusually stretches from floor to vault and makes the organ part of the architecture of the church, was designed by Jacob van Campen, a leading architect of the time. The enormous canvas shutters were painted by Caesar van Everdingen. The organ was rebuilt in 1723 by Frans Caspar Schnitger. He left the casework much as it was, but created an organ in the North German style within the old case. He reused much of the old flue pipes and added new mixtures and reeds were new. The organ has not been changed much since then, and is rare in that 90 percent of the original material, pipework, action, soundboards, case, survives. As such it is one of the most important organs in the world. It is the subject of a documentary made in 2013 and released on DVD by Fugue State Films as "Alkmaar: The Organs of the Laurenskerk".

== Carillon ==
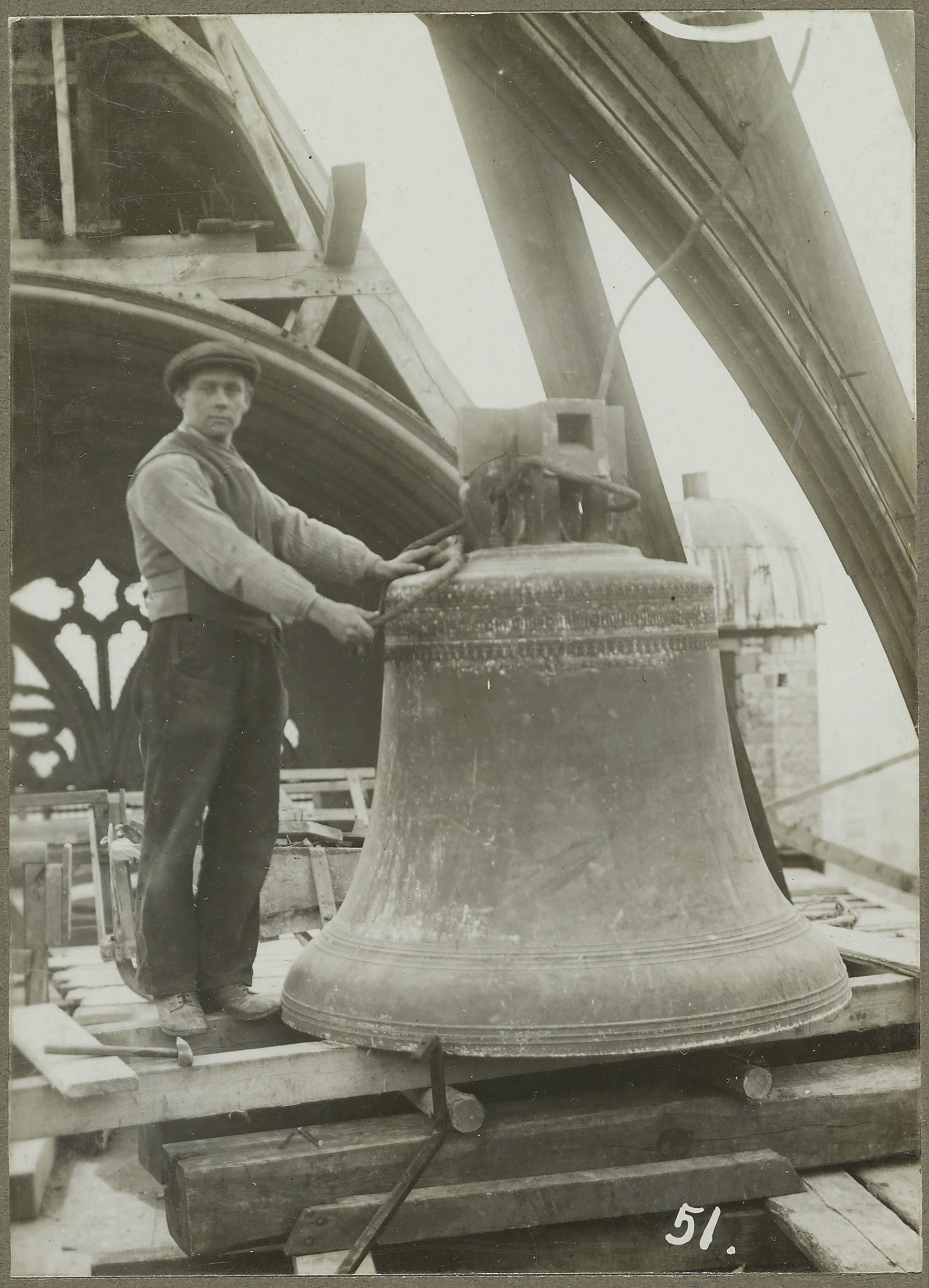
The bourdon bell by C. and J. Moer cast in 1525 (photo c. 1900 when the turret was restored)

The hour bell (bourdon) was made by Casparus and Johannes Moer in 1525, with a diameter or 130 cm. tone Cis1. ±1950 kg. The bell was given by the abbot of the monastery in Egmond near Alkmaar. The text on the bell:

Ick heet Saligmaeker. Als ick geluydt word bedrijf ick rou over de dooden. Door mijn clanck verdrijf ick de listen en plagen des Satans. Heer Meiard Man Abt tot Egmond heeft mij gegeven. Casparus en Johannes Moer fecerunt 1525.

Translation in English: (My name is Saviour. When I am rung I mourn over the departed. Through my sound I drive the wiles and pests of Satan away. I was given by Sir Meiard man abbot till Egmond. Casparus and Johannes Moer fecerunt (made me) 1525.)

The carillon under the bourdon has 35 bells. The largest 16 by Melchior de Haze (1688/89) were made for this turret. 12 smaller bells from de Waag (the weigh house) also cast by M. de Haze, and 7 modern bells by Eijsbouts. In 2014 the turret is undergoing restoration; the bell part is by Clock o Matic from Holsbeek Belgium.

== Current function ==
The church is formally owned by the "Stichting Behoud Monumentale Kerken Alkmaar" (foundation for the preservation of heritage churches in Alkmaar), which conducts restoration activities and rents it out for weddings and concerts, but also facilitates various cultural initiatives of the city.

The main part of the church is open to visitors at no charge. There is an admission charge to go into the upper levels and outer viewing areas.

A bar has been added into the southern transept.
