= Extraordinary Jubilee of Mercy =

27th Holy Year in the Catholic Church

- Official logo
- Native name: Iubilaeum Extraordinarium Misericordiae
- Date: 8 December 2015 – 20 November 2016
- Duration: 349 days
- Location: Worldwide
- Type: Jubilee
- Theme: Mercy
- Organised by: Various dioceses
- Website: www.im.va

The Extraordinary Jubilee of Mercy (Latin: Iubilaeum Extraordinarium Misericordiae) was a Catholic period of prayer held from 8 December 2015, the Solemnity of the Immaculate Conception, to 20 November 2016, the Feast of Christ the King. Like previous jubilees, it was seen by the Church as a period for remission of sins and universal pardon focusing particularly on God's forgiveness and mercy. It was an extraordinary Jubilee because it had not been predetermined long before; ordinary jubilees are usually celebrated every 25 years.

The 2016 Jubilee was first announced by Pope Francis on 13 March 2015. It was declared in the pope's April 2015 papal bull of indiction (formal announcement or proclamation), Misericordiae Vultus (Latin for "The Face of Mercy"). It is the 27th holy year in history, following the ordinary 2000 Jubilee during John Paul II's papacy. The opening day was also the 50th anniversary of the closing of the Second Vatican Council.

Francis wished for the Jubilee to be celebrated not only in Rome but all around the world; for the first time holy doors were opened in single dioceses, either in the cathedral or in historical churches. The first holy door was opened by Pope Francis in Bangui on 29 November 2015, during a tour of East Africa.

The Jubilee officially ended on 20 November 2016 with the closing of the Holy Door of Saint Peter's Basilica, which had been open since the Holy Year began the previous December.

== Papal bull ==
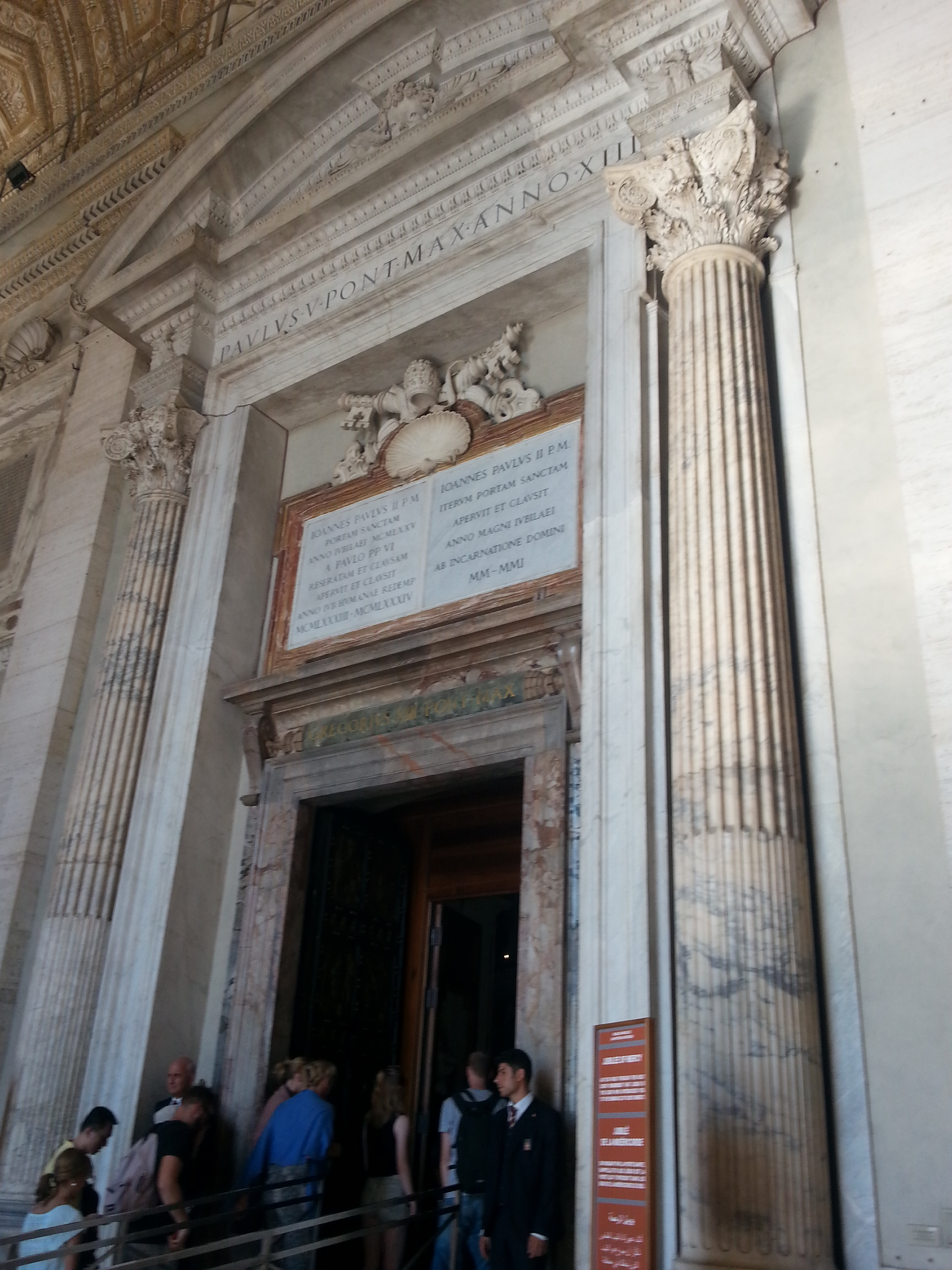
The Holy Door of St. Peter's Basilica, opened in 2016

The Jubilee of Mercy was formally declared through the papal bull Misericordiae vultus, issued on 11 April 2015, which emphasizes the importance of mercy and the need to "gaze" on it; the bull also recalls the need for the Church to be more open, keeping alive the spirit of the Second Vatican Council.

The holy doors of the major basilicas of Rome (including the Great Door of St. Peter's) were opened, and special "Doors of Mercy" were opened at cathedrals and other major churches around the world. The opening of the holy door at St. Peter's was the first time two popes were present, as Pontiff Emeritus Benedict attended at Pope Francis' invitation.

The church held that by passing through these doors, the faithful can earn indulgences after fulfilling the usual conditions of prayer for the pope's intentions, Confession, and detachment from sin, and Communion. During Lent of that year, special 24-hour penance services were to be celebrated, and during the year, special qualified and experienced priests called Missionaries of Mercy were to be available in every diocese to forgive even sins normally reserved to the Holy See's Apostolic Penitentiary.

In the bull, Pope Francis stated about the opening of the holy door, "the Holy Door will become a Door of Mercy through which anyone who enters will experience the love of God who consoles, pardons, and instils hope".

== Concessions ==
It was announced that all priests (during the Jubilee year – ending 20 November 2016) would be allowed in the Sacrament of Penance to remove censures for abortion, which outside North America is reserved to bishops and certain priests who are given such mandate by their bishop.

By the same letter, Pope Francis also granted permission for priests of the Society of Saint Pius X to validly confer absolution, while under normal circumstances they do not possess the jurisdiction needed to confer this sacrament.

== Logo and hymn ==
The official logo, designed by Father Marko Rupnik, shows Jesus, personification of Mercy, carrying on his shoulders a "lost man", emphasizing how deep the Savior touches humanity; his eyes are merged with those of the carried man. The background is filled by three concentric ovals, with lighter colors outwards, meaning that Jesus is carrying the man out of the darkness of sin. On one side the image is also joined by the official motto: Misericordes Sicut Pater (Merciful Like the Father), derived from Luke 6:36, which stands as an invitation to follow the example of the Father by loving and forgiving without limits.

The official hymn, with most verses derived from the Gospels, First Corinthians and Psalms, was written by Eugenio Costa, S.J., with original music composed by Paul Inwood.

== Main events ==
The following main events and days of celebration for specific categories of the faithful were scheduled:

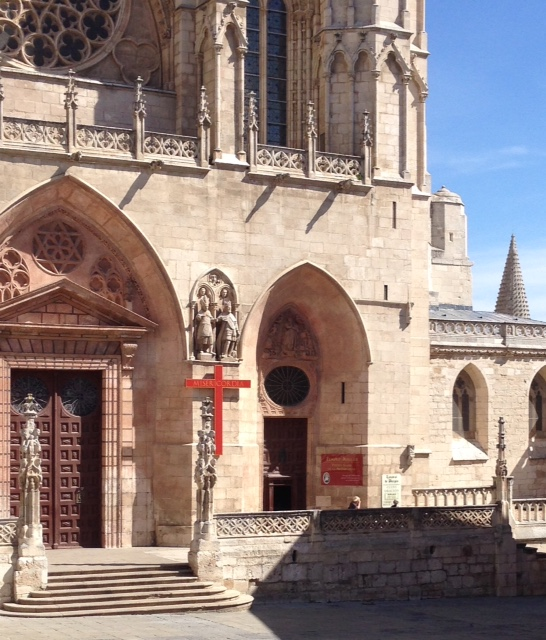
The Holy Door of the Cathedral in Burgos, Spain, for the Holy Year of Mercy, 2015–16

- 29 November 2015: opening of a holy door in Bangui's Notre-Dame Cathedral
- 8 December 2015: opening of the holy door in St. Peter's Basilica
- 13 December 2015: opening of the holy door in the Archbasilica of St. John Lateran, the Basilica of Saint Paul Outside the Walls, and in many cathedrals around the world
- 1 January 2016: opening of the holy door in the Basilica di Santa Maria Maggiore
- 19–21 January 2016: Jubilee for the pilgrims
- 2 February 2016: Jubilee for consecrated lives, closing of the "Year for Consecrated Life"
- 22 February 2016: Jubilee for the Roman Curia
- 4–5 March 2016: penitential liturgy and call for "24 Hours for the Lord"
- 20 March 2016: Palm Sunday
- 3 April 2016: Jubilee for all those who find themselves in the spirituality of mercy
- 24 April 2016: Jubilee for newly confirmed aged 13–16 (to older young people is dedicated the World Youth Day in July)
- 27–29 May 2016: Jubilee for deacons
- 3 June 2016: Jubilee for priests
- 12 June 2016: Jubilee for diseased people and those who assist them
- 26–31 July 2016: Jubilee for young people and World Youth Day 2016 in Kraków, Poland
- 4 September 2016: Jubilee for volunteers
- 25 September 2016: Jubilee for catechists
- 8–9 October 2016: Marian Jubilee
- 6 November 2016: Jubilee for prisoners; some prisoners were to attend celebrations in St. Peter's Basilica
- 11–13 November 2016: Jubilee for the Socially Excluded
- 13 November 2016: Jubilee for the Socially Marginalized in St. Peter's Basilica; closing of holy doors everywhere except St. Peter's Basilica
- 20 November 2016: closing of the holy door in St. Peter's Basilica

== Misericordia et misera ==
Misericordia et misera is an apostolic letter authored by Pope Francis and scheduled for release on 21 November 2016 following the conclusion of the Extraordinary Jubilee of Mercy. He signed it in a public ceremony on 20 November and presented copies to representatives chosen to represent the universal audience for his message: Philippine cardinal Luis Antonio Tagle of Manila, Scottish archbishop Leo Cushley, two missionary priests from Brazil and the Democratic Republic of the Congo, a Roman deacon and his family, two women religious from South Korea and Mexico, three generations of a U.S. family, an engaged couple, religious instructors, and two people representing the disabled and the sick.

The title of the document references Saint Augustine's commentary on Jesus and the woman taken in adultery in the Gospel of John. After Jesus challenges her accusers and they withdraw, Augustine says that only misera et misericordia (misery and mercy) (Note: The American prelate Robert Barron, also reversing the terms, glosses this phrase as "Jesus and the woman ... giver and receiver of compassion".) remain. Pope Francis reverses the two terms Augustine used.

The document was released at a press conference hosted by Rino Fisichella, President of the Pontifical Council for the Promotion of the New Evangelisation.

== Media responses ==
Art historian Ralf van Bühren said that the Jubilee was an excellent opportunity for cultural and arts journalism, because mercy has been an important subject of Christian iconography. Since the Middle Ages, many representations in art encouraged people to practice the works of mercy and helped "the audience to explore mercy in their own lives", as Bühren explains using the example of Caravaggio's painting in Naples. He felt that in this way the Jubilee Year of Mercy "issued a call to journalists, multimedia experts and social media communicators to report on facts, people, ideas and evangelization by using Christian art to explore benevolence, pardon, and mercy".

== See also ==
- World Day of the Poor
