= Pio Monte della Misericordia =

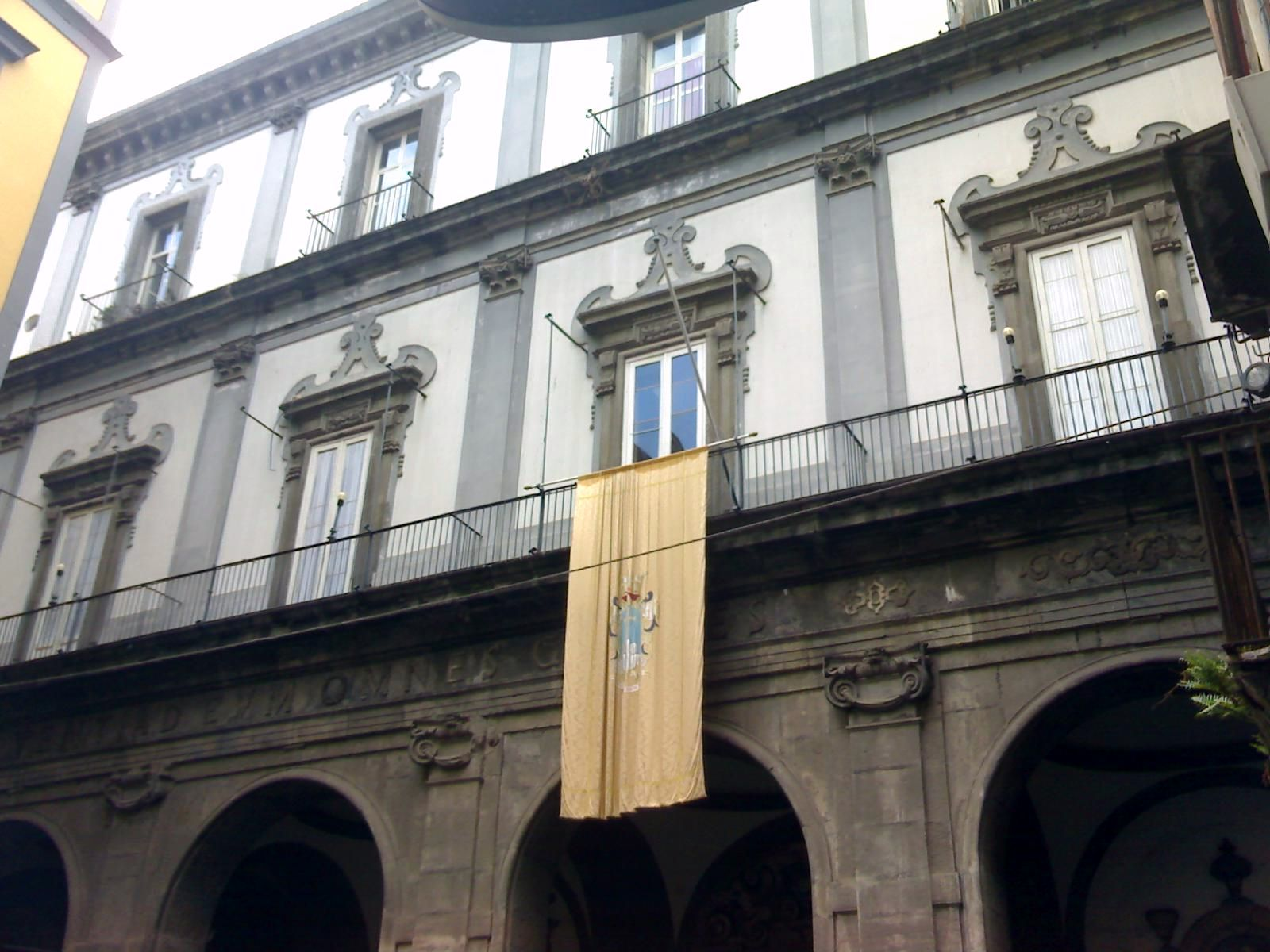
- Façade
- Interactive fullscreen map
- Established: 1602
- Location: Via dei Tribunali 253, Naples, Campania, Italy
- Coordinates: 40°51′07″N 14°15′38″E
- Type: Art museum, Historic site
- Website: www.piomontedellamisericordia.it

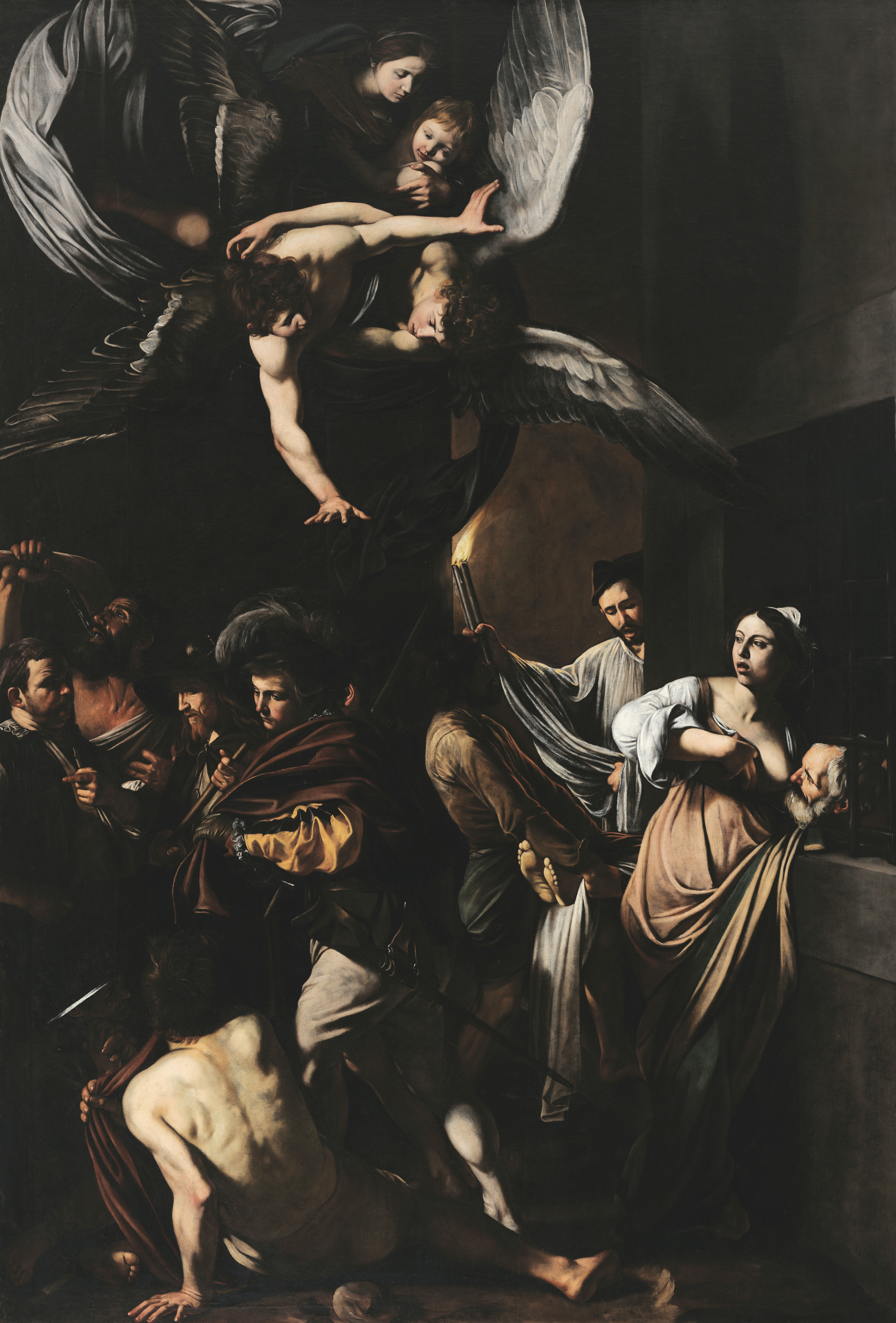
Seven Works of Mercy, 1606–1607, at the altar of Pio Monte della Misericordia, Naples

The Pio Monte della Misericordia is a church in the historic centre of Naples, southern Italy. It is famous for its art works, including Caravaggio's The Seven Works of Mercy. A charity brotherhood (called Pio Monte della Misericordia, meaning 'Pious Mount of Mercy') was founded in August 1601 by seven young nobles, who met every Friday at the Hospital for Incurables and ministered to the sick.

In 1602, they established an institution and commissioned a small church, built by Giovanni Giacomo Di Conforto, near the staircase leading to the Cathedral, on the corner of the Via dei Tribunali and the Vico, and Vicoletto, of Zuroli. In 1605, they received an apostolic letter from Pope Paul V, according special privileges to the high altar.

The church was consecrated in September 1606. From 1658 to 1678 the edifice was enlarged, also with the annexation of neighbouring structures, by architect Francesco Antonio Picchiati, forming a complex with a palace and a renewed church.

The latter, at the high altar, houses Caravaggio's Seven Works of Mercy. There are also paintings by Luca Giordano, Carlo Sellitto, Fabrizio Santafede, Battistello Caracciolo and others.

The noblemen of the brotherhood at Pio Monte della Misericordia were looking for painters "to give permanent visual expression to their sense of charitable mission". Regarding the sharp contrasts of the chiaroscuro in Caravaggio's painting’s, the German art historian Ralf van Bühren explains the bright light as a metaphor for mercy, which "helps the audience to explore mercy in their own lives".
