= Franca Trentin =

Italian–French partisan and professor (1919–2010)

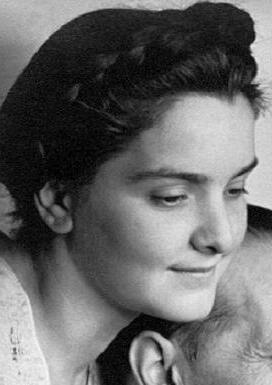
- Franca Trentin c. 1955
- Born: 13 December 1919; Venice, Kingdom of Italy
- Died: November 28, 2010 (aged 90); Venice, Italy
- Other name: Franca Trentin Baratto
- Citizenship: Italian; French (from 1940)
- Spouses: Horace Torrubia (m. 1944; div. 1954); Mario Baratto (m. 1956)
- Children: 2
- Parent: Silvio Trentin (father)
- Relatives: Bruno Trentin (brother)
- Awards: Cross of the Resistance Volunteer Combatant, 1945; Legion of Honour, 1978; Ordre national du Mérite, 1997

Academic work
- Discipline: Italian language and literature
- Institutions: University of Dijon; University of Paris Faculty of Humanities; Ca' Foscari University of Venice

Franca Trentin (married name; Trentin Baratto; 13 December 1919 – 28 November 2010) was an Italian–French partisan, anti-fascist and professor of Italian literature. In 1926, Trentin's family fled France after her father Silvio Trentin protested against the fascist Italian government. She grew up among his anti-fascist associates and joined him in supporting the French Resistance. Trentin stayed in France when her family returned to Italy in 1943 and became a professor of Italian language and literature in 1951. She taught at the University of Dijon, the University of Paris Faculty of Humanities, and Ca' Foscari University of Venice. Trentin retired in 1985, and she spent the remainder of her life supporting feminist causes and researching the history of the French Resistance.

== Early life and education ==
Franca Trentin as born on 13 December 1919 in Venice, Kingdom of Italy (present-day Italy) to Silvio Trentin, a lawyer, professor, and member of Parliament, and Giuseppina Nardari. One of three siblings, Trentin was the elder sister of the partisan, trade unionist and politician Bruno Trentin.

In 1926, the family fled to France as the persecution of civil servants increased under Mussolini. Her father wrote a letter protesting the dictatorship's control over academia before he left, and as an adult Trentin later expressed frustration that he was not given credit for this act. They first settled in Pavie, France, where Trentin attended school with nuns, but the family's farm went bankrupt and they moved to Auch, France. Describing her childhood later on, she said she was stigmatized for being Italian.

The Trentin family moved to Toulouse, France, in 1934, and Trentin finished secondary school in 1936. She received a degree from Toulouse's Faculty of Arts in 1939, followed by a postgraduate diploma in 1940 and a bachelor's degree in Italian language and literature in 1942. Trentin worked several jobs while continuing her studies, including work as a substitute teacher, a translator, an interpreter a summer camp supervisor, and secretary to the dean of the Faculty of Arts. Trentin was adamant that she become a French citizen, and she was naturalized in 1940.

Trentin's father opened a bookstore after the family moved to Toulouse, where he hosted anti-fascists. Along with her siblings, Trentin began following politics during the Spanish Civil War in 1936. The political environment of her father's bookstore allowed her to learn about the anti-fascist movement. She worked alongside her mother at Camp de Gurs to help Spanish refugees after the war ended in 1939. The Trentin family bookstore saw a greater influx of exiled and anti-fascist visitors following the occupation of northern France in 1940.

== French Resistance ==
Trentin joined her father when he founded a French Resistance group, Libérer et Fédérer. She used the right to free movement she gained with her French citizenship to deliver messages in Lyon and Marseille, and members started calling her the group's "shooting star". Trentin stayed in France when the rest of her family moved back to Italy in 1943. Libérer et Fédérer never achieved major influence, especially after Trentin's father left, but she continued working with the French resistance movement.

Trentin arrived in Italy during the liberation. She then moved back to Toulouse with her husband following the liberation of France. She was given the Cross of the Resistance Volunteer Combatant the same year. Trentin and her husband then moved to Paris.

== Career ==
Obtaining full French citizenship in 1950, Trentin passed the examination to become a certified Italian language and literature teacher the following year. She became an assistant professor at the University of Dijon Faculty of Arts.

Trentin became a research fellow at the French National Centre for Scientific Research (CNRS) in 1956. Her mentor Henri Bédarida died in 1957, and she succeeded him at the University of Paris Faculty of Humanities (the Sorbonne). She left the CNRS in 1959 to take her position as head of the university's Italian department. Trentin became a senior lecturer and union representative for the Sorbonne in 1961 and was then given a secondment to the Ca' Foscari University of Venice Faculty of Languages in 1966, where she taught French language and literature. She worked here until her retirement in 1985.

Throughout her academic career, Trentin spent long periods of time preparing and revising material for any lecture or conference she delivered. For her work, she received the Chevalier Legion of Honour in 1978 and the Ordre national du Mérite in 1997.

After retiring, Trentin continued working on research of the French Resistance after retiring and served as president of the Venetian Institute for the History of the Resistance and Contemporary Society from 1996 to 2000. She also worked with the French and Italian feminist movements later in life. She became a pacifist during the Gulf War in 1990 and founded the women's pacifism movement Donne sul piede di pace. She also joined the leadership of the feminist group Donne per la città. Trentin spoke at the restoration of the Monumento al Partigiano in 2009. She co-founded the women's history organization rEsistenze and donated her archives to the group shortly before her death.

=== Beliefs ===
Trentin was an anti-fascist, feminist, and pacifist. She believed in a pan-European identity, a belief she developed growing up surrounded by anti-fascists from across Europe. As a feminist, she supported the abortion-rights movement and women's participation in politics. She was a fan of the philosopher Jean-Paul Sartre.

== Personal life ==
On 2 March 1944, Trentin married Horace Torrubia, a Catalan communist who fought in the Spanish Civil War. Trentin and Torrubia had one son before later divorcing in 1954.

In 1956, Trentin married Mario Baratto, an Italian language and literature professor. Trentin and Baratto had one son.

Trentin died in her home in Venice on 28 November 2010.
