= Door of the Dead =

The Door of the Dead or the Door of Death may refer to:

- Door of Death, a book in the Fear Street Sagas fiction series
- Door of the Dead in St. Peter's Basilica, a bronze door in Vatican City
- Porte des Morts (the Door of Death), a strait in Wisconsin, United States
