= Fordham Francis Index =

The Fordham Francis Index (Full Name: Fordham University's Pope Francis Global Poverty Index) is a multidimensional measure of international poverty. It is a simple tool that relies on seven primary indicators which are categorized into a Material Well-being Index and a Spiritual Well-being Index. It was launched on September 23, 2016 at a Fordham conference entitled Pope Francis' Call for Escaping Poverty co-sponsored by the Vatican Foundation Centesimus Annus Pro Pontifice. The research is conducted by students from Fordham's Graduate Program in International Political Economy and Development(IPED), under the research direction of Dr. Henry Schwalbenberg and Dr. Donna Odra. The Fordham Francis Index is a response to the Pope's Address to the United Nations in New York last September 25, 2015. Each year to commemorate the World Day of the Poor, the IPED Program presents the new annual Fordham Francis Index report at a side event of the United Nations.

== Origin ==
Pope Francis’ Address to the United Nations was part of his apostolic journey to Cuba, the United States of America and to the United Nations Organization Headquarters on the occasion of his participation at the Eighth World Meeting of Families in Philadelphia from 19 to 28 September 2015.

In his speech at the UN, he stated that:

“the simplest and best measure and indicator of the implementation of the new Agenda for Development will be effective, practical and immediate access, on the part of all, to essential material and spiritual goods: housing, dignified and properly remunerated employment, adequate food and drinking water; religious freedom and, more generally, spiritual freedom and education. These pillars of integral human development have a common foundation, which is the right to life and, more generally, what we could call the right to existence of human nature itself.”

== Fordham Francis Index Construction ==
The Fordham Francis Index is a broad measure of global poverty - it is based on a small number of indicators that are strongly correlated with many aspects of development and can therefore serve as a proxy for overall success in achieving the UN's Sustainable Development Goals. It is also an innovative measure of human well-being since it explicitly attempts to measure spiritual welfare.

Selection of these well-being indicators took into consideration availability of data for many countries, credibility of the data source, and the breadth of its measure. These 7 primary indicators are categorized into two areas: Material Well-being and Spiritual Well-being.

=== Material Well-being Components ===
     * Water – the percentage of a population using an improved drinking water source[8]
     * Food – the prevalence of undernourishment[9]
     * Housing – access to adequate housing[10]
     * Employment – distressed labor rate[11][12]

=== Spiritual Well-being Components ===
     * Education – Adult literacy rates[13]
     * Gender equity – Sex ratio at birth (female-over-male ratio) and ratio of female healthy life expectancy over male healthy life expectancy[14]
     * Religious Freedom – Government Restrictions Index[15]

== Methodology ==
The approach to computing the Fordham Francis Index is identical to the methodology employed by the United Nations Development Program (UNDP) in their calculation of the Human Development Index (HDI). Using the same methodology means that any differences between the two indices are solely attributed to substantive differences in their components. The Fordham Francis Index is an equally weighted geometric mean of Material Index and Spiritual Index.

The Material Index and Spiritual Index are also equally weighted geometric means of the standardized value of their primary indicators. To achieve this, the primary indicators were transformed into standardized formula so that they each yielded indices with values between 0 and 1. Measures of food, employment and religious freedom were inverted so that for all seven measures a higher number would represent a more desirable outcome.

$Primary Indicator Score= \frac{(Actual value-Minimum Theoretical Value of Statistic)}{(Maximum Value of Statistic-Minimum Theoretical Value of Statistic)}$

== Report ==
For details and results between 2016 and 2022, refer to the IPED Publication of the reports here: Fordham Francis Index

For the results between 2023 and 2025, refer to the following IPED Publications: 2023 FFI, 2024 FFI, 2025 FFI.

== Citations ==
1. Barone, C. (2024, November 17). World Day of Poor: Report shows global poverty efforts have stalled. National Catholic Reporter. https://www.ncronline.org/news/world-day-poor-report-shows-global-poverty-efforts-have-stalled
2. Fatahi, K. (2022, November 16). Fordham Hosts UN Event for Pope Francis’ World Day of the Poor. The Observer. https://fordhamobserver.com/71151/recent/news/fordham-hosts-un-event-for-pope-francis-world-day-of-the-poor/
3. Herlinger, C. (2023, November 23). Global poverty wanes while other challenges rise, Fordham study says. Global Sisters Report. https://www.globalsistersreport.org/news/global-poverty-wanes-while-other-challenges-rise-fordham-study-says
4. O’Brien, M., & Hoover, J. (2023, November 22). 2023 Pope Francis Global Poverty Index: Religious freedom improved but gender equality declined. America Magazine. https://www.americamagazine.org/politics-society/2023/11/22/fordham-popefrancis-report-poverty-246553
5. Parker, C. (2022, November 18). Pope Francis gave the U.N. 7 priorities for ending global poverty. Now, Fordham students are evaluating the world’s progress. America Magazine. https://www.americamagazine.org/faith/2022/11/18/poverty-francis-index-244183
6. Sadowski, D. (2022, November 14). Fordham report finds poverty growing globally, reversing recent gains. Franciscan Media. https://www.franciscanmedia.org/news-commentary/fordham-report-finds-poverty-growing-globally-reversing-recent-gains/
7. Schwankert, S. (2024, November 18). Fordham Francis Index Shows Religious Freedom a Rising Issue for the Poor. The Good Newsroom. https://thegoodnewsroom.org/fordham-francis-index-shows-religious-freedom-a-rising-issue-for-the-poor/
