= Manzu =

Manzu may refer to:

- Giacomo Manzù, an Italian sculptor (1908–1991).
- Mǎnzú, a Chinese spelling of Manchu people.
- Mânzu, a village in Cilibia Commune, Buzău County, Romania
