= The Seven Works of Mercy (Caravaggio) =

Painting by Caravaggio

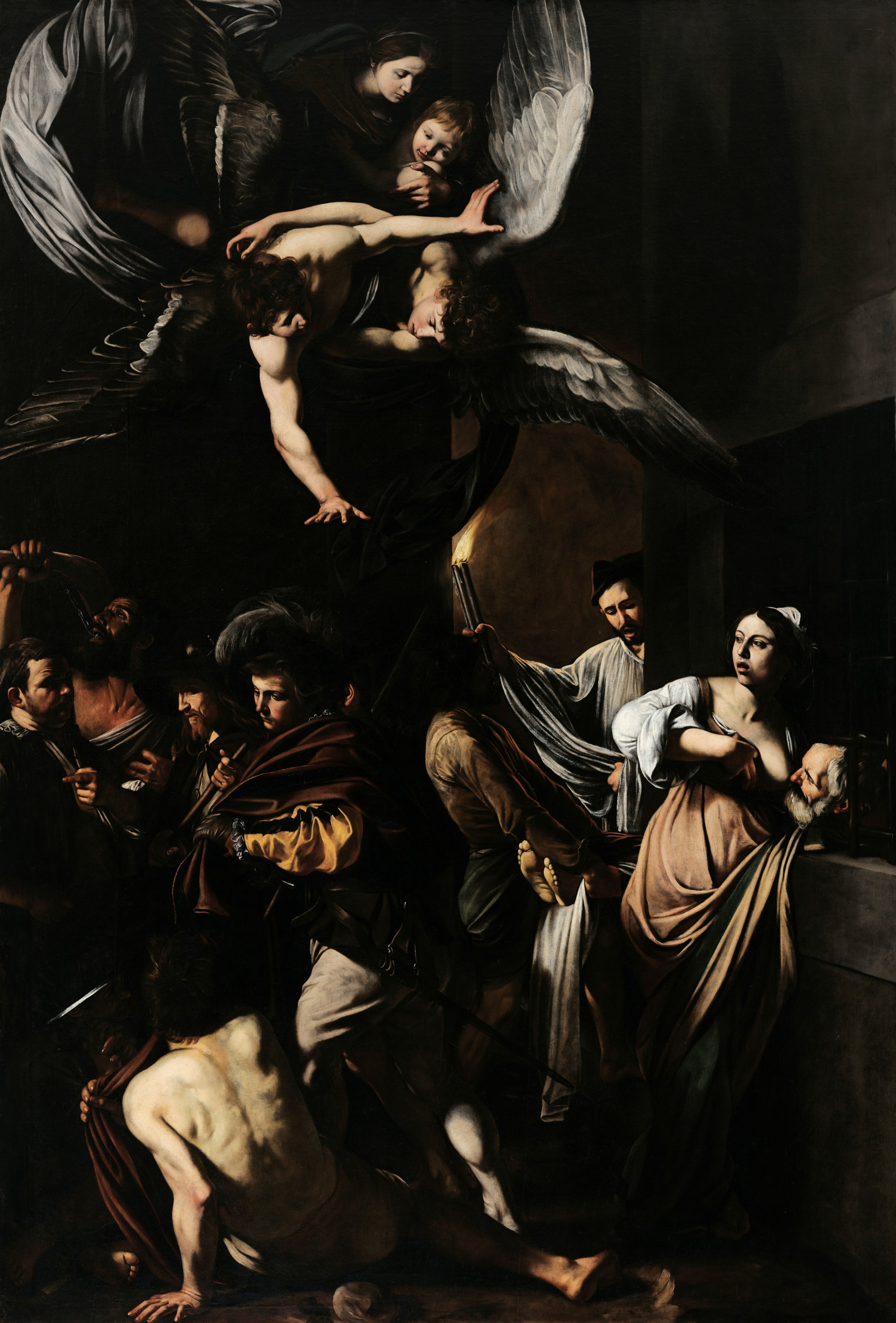
- Artist: Caravaggio
- Year: 1607
- Medium: Oil on canvas
- Dimensions: 390 cm × 260 cm (150 in × 100 in)
- Location: Pio Monte della Misericordia; Naples

The Seven Works of Mercy (Italian: Sette opere di Misericordia), also known as The Seven Acts of Mercy, is an oil painting by Italian painter Caravaggio, circa 1607. The painting depicts the seven corporal works of mercy in traditional Catholic belief, which are a set of compassionate acts concerning the material needs of others.

The painting was made for, and is still housed in, the church of Pio Monte della Misericordia in Naples. Originally, it was meant to be seven separate panels around the church; however, Caravaggio combined all seven works of mercy in one composition which became the church's altarpiece. The painting is better seen from "il coretto" (the little choir) in the first floor.

== Iconography ==
The titular seven works/acts of mercy are represented in the painting as follows:

Bury the dead
In the background, two men carry a dead man (of whom only the feet are visible).
Visit the imprisoned, and feed the hungry
On the right, a woman visits an imprisoned deputy and gives him milk from her breast. This image alludes to the classical story of Roman Charity.
Shelter the homeless
A pilgrim (third from left, as identified by the shell in his hat) asks an innkeeper (at far left) for shelter.
Clothe the naked
St. Martin of Tours, fourth from the left, has torn his robe in half and given it to the naked beggar in the foreground, recalling the saint's popular legend.
Visit the sick
St. Martin greets and comforts the beggar who is a cripple.
Refresh the thirsty
Samson (second from the left) drinks water from the jawbone of an ass.

== Interpretation ==
American art historian John Spike notes that the angel at the center of Caravaggio's altarpiece transmits the grace that inspires humanity to be merciful.

Spike also notes that the choice of Samson as an emblem of Giving Drink to the Thirsty is so peculiar as to demand some explanation. The fearsome scourge of the Philistines was a deeply flawed man who accomplished his heroic tasks through the grace of God. When Samson was in danger of dying of thirst, God gave him water to drink from the jawbone of an ass. It is difficult to square this miracle with an allegory of the Seven Acts of Mercy since it was not in fact the work of human charity.

Regarding the sharp contrasts of the painting's chiaroscuro, the German art historian Ralf van Bühren explains the bright light as a metaphor for mercy, which "helps the audience to explore mercy in their own lives". Current scholarship has also established the connection between the iconography of "The Seven Works of Mercy" and the cultural, scientific and philosophical circles of the painting's commissioners.

== Legacy ==
The Seven Works of Mercy was adapted for the theatre in 2016 by the Royal Shakespeare Company. Written by Anders Lustgarten, The Seven Acts of Mercy was directed by Erica Whyman, the Deputy Artistic Director at the Royal Shakespeare Company.

Terence Ward created a biographical thriller of the painting, along with a story of how the painting continues to affect lives today, with his book The Guardian of Mercy: How an Extraordinary Painting by Caravaggio Changed an Ordinary Life Today, released by Arcade Publishing in 2016.

Irish poet Catherine Ann Cullen wrote seven poems on the painting, which were published in The Other Now in 2016.

== See also ==
- List of paintings by Caravaggio
