= Monument to the Brothers Calvi, Bergamo =

Monument in Lombardy, Italy

Coordinates: 45°41′39″N 9°40′07″E

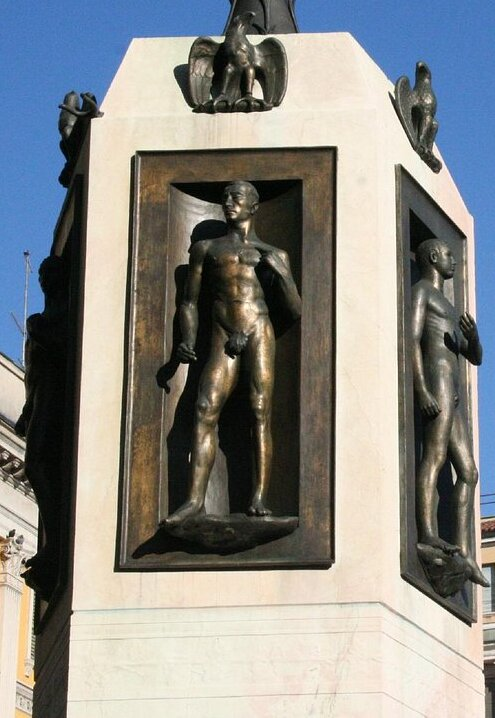
Monument to the Brothers Calvi

The Monument to the Brothers Calvi is a monument located in Piazza Matteotti in front of Palazzo Frizzoni (now the city hall) in the lower town of Bergamo, in the region of Lombardy, Italy. It commemorates the four brothers who served as Alpini or mountain infantry, who died during or shortly after the First World War. In the decades after the war, the brothers were revered for their exemplary martyrdom for the Italian nation.

== Description ==
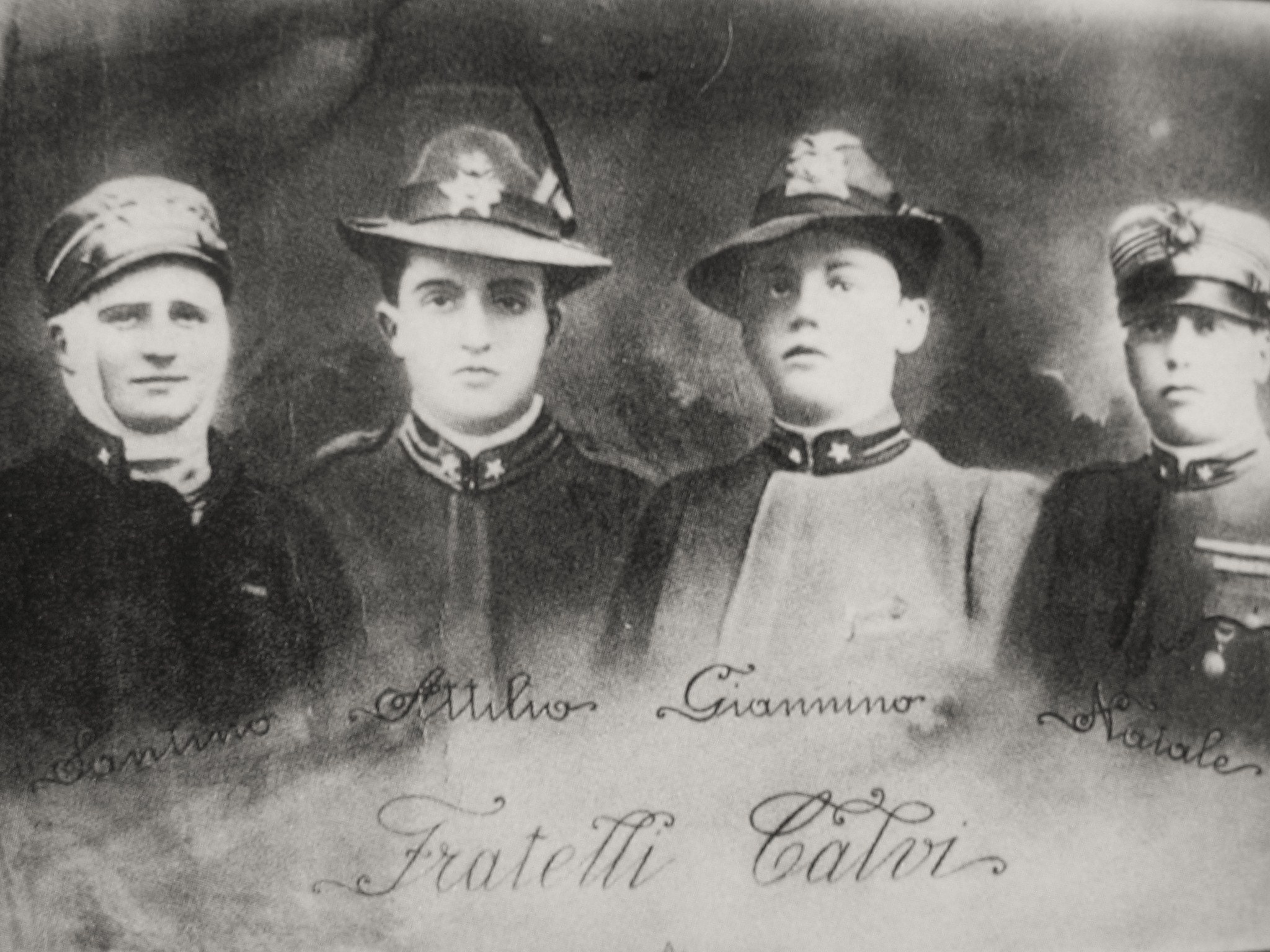
The Calvi Brothers

The monument is a pentagonal plinth, made with marble Zandobbio with a flagpole with the Italian flag atop. On the superior register of the plinth are four bronze nude youths symbolizing the four brothers: Natale (1887 – 1920), Attilio (1889 – 1916), Sante (1895 – 1917), and Giannino (1899 – 1919) who died after service to the nation. In 1921, a ceremony honoring them and their mother was attended by the King, Benito Mussolini, and Gabriele D'Annunzio. Above each male statue are bronze eagles. The fifth side has a striding youthful maiden symbolizing Victory. The marble is simply engraved with the phrase AI FRATELLI CALVI (which translates to TO THE CALVI BROTHERS). The marble of this middle register has plaques engraved with depictions of battles in which the brothers were involved.

The monument was completed in 1933, designed by the architect Giuseppe Pizzigoni (1901-1967). The reliefs were completed by Giacomo Manzù. Within weeks of completion, the male genitals were covered up with fig leaves.

The idea of a monument to a sibship sacrificed for the country is also celebrated in the Monument to the Cairoli Brothers located on Pincian Hill in Rome; however, unlike that 1872 Romantic monument, the images of the Calvi monument, are less individualized, and are represented by nonspecific muscular youth subsumed into a national struggle.
