= Misericordiae vultus =

2015 papal bull issued by Pope Francis

Misericordiae vultus Latin for 'The Face of Mercy' Papal bull of Pope Francis
- Signature date: 11 April 2015
- Subject: Indiction of Extraordinary Jubilee of Mercy
- Text: In Latin; In English

Misericordiae vultus (Latin: The Face of Mercy) is a papal bull of indiction issued on April 11, 2015, by Pope Francis, proclaiming an Extraordinary Jubilee of Mercy from 8 December 2015, the Feast of the Immaculate Conception, to 20 November 2016, the Feast of Christ the King.

== History ==
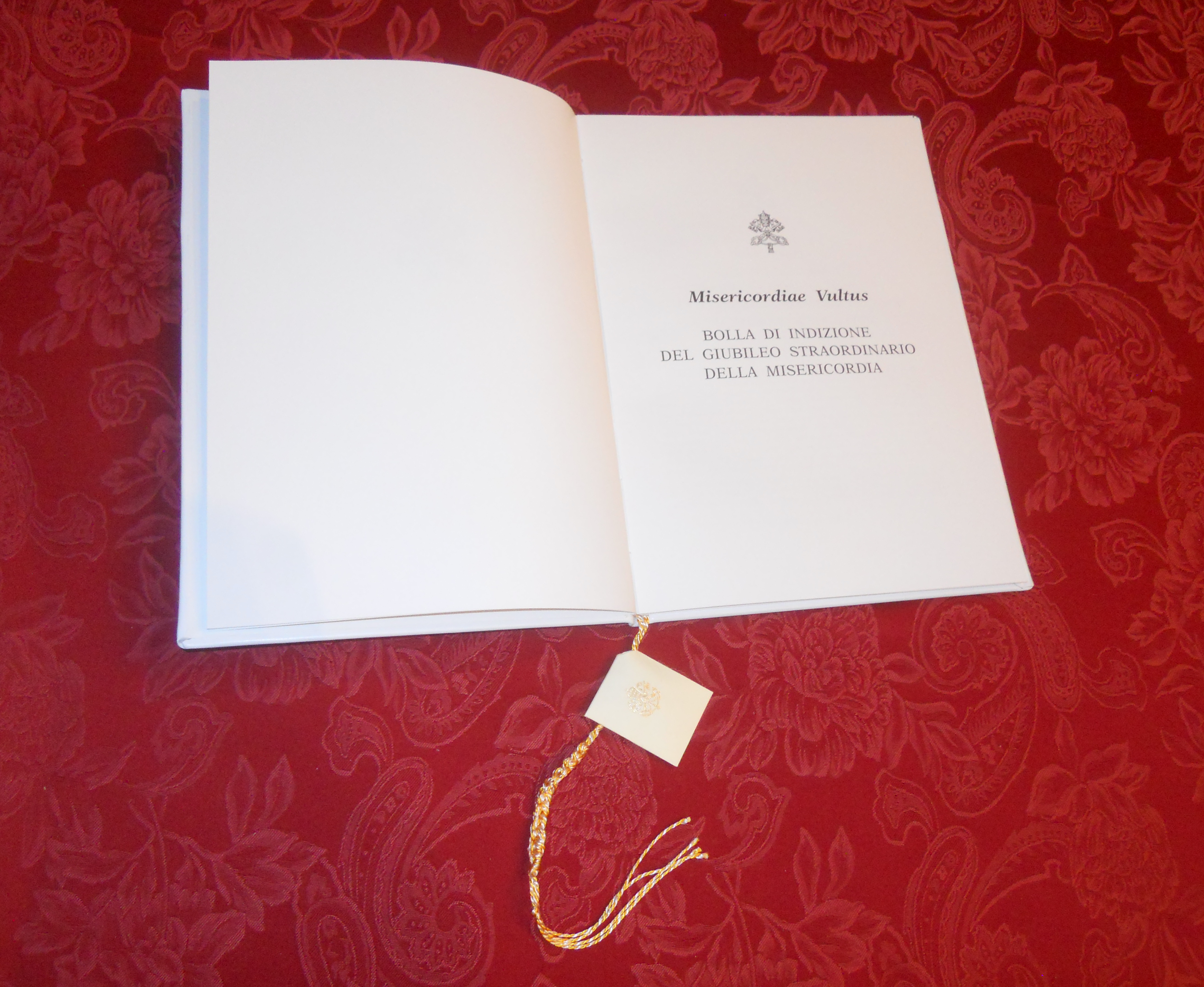
Copy of Pope Francis' Papal Bull Misericordiæ Vultus

The 2016 Jubilee was first announced by Pope Francis during a homily at Mass on 13 March 2015, at which he said that the church must always keep its doors open so no one is excluded from God's mercy.

== Content ==
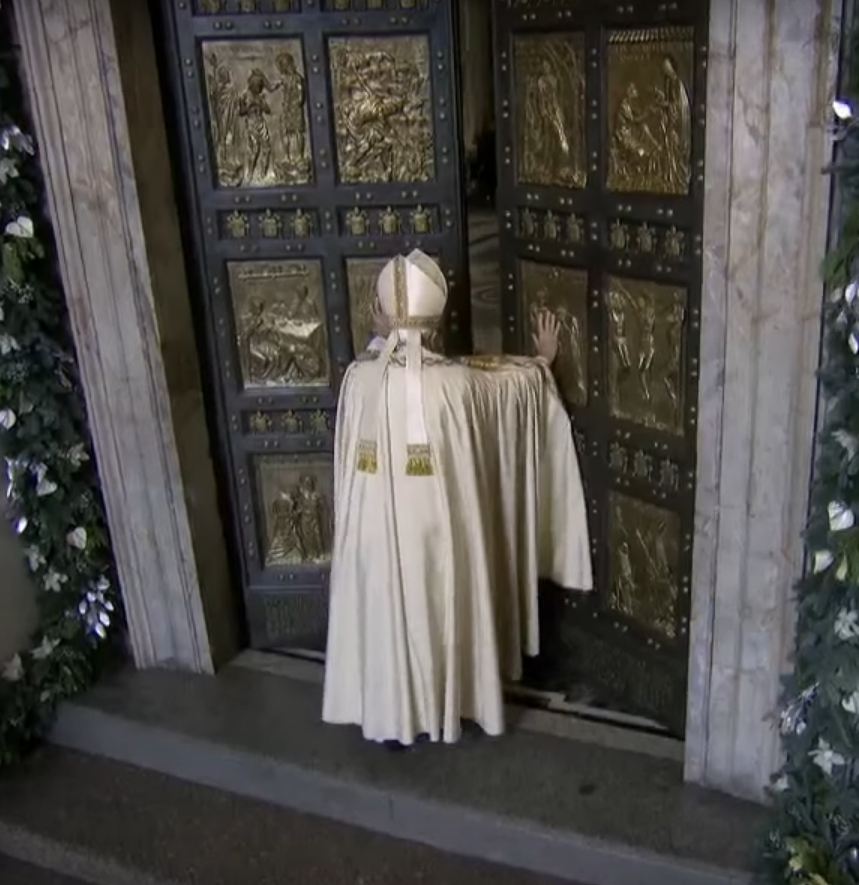
Opening of the Holy Door 2015

The bull is the fundamental document for the Holy Year that outlines the overall spirit and intentions for the Jubilee, as well as the spiritual fruits that are hoped for.

The proclamation begins, "Jesus Christ is the face of the Father's mercy. ... The Father, "rich in mercy" (Eph 2:4), after having revealed his name to Moses as "a God merciful and gracious, slow to anger, and abounding in steadfast love and faithfulness" (Ex 34:6), has never ceased to show, in various ways throughout history, his divine nature. It then quotes from Dei verbum, the dogmatic constitution on divine revelation issued by the Second Vatican Council: "To see Jesus is to see His Father (John 14:9)". "Mercy will always be greater than any sin, and no one can place limits on the love of God who is ever ready to forgive."

The decree also mentions the Pope's hope that the Holy Year would be a time for increased dialogue with Judaism, Islam, "and other noble religious traditions", "... so that we might know and understand one another better; may it eliminate every form of closed-mindedness and disrespect, and drive out every form of violence and discrimination."

In closing, he said, "In this Jubilee Year, let us allow God to surprise us".

== Implementation ==
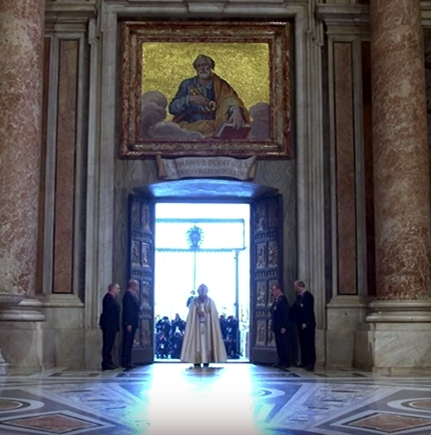
Pope Francis opens the Holy Door marking the beginning of the Extraordinary Jubilee of Mercy.

In announcing the Extraordinary Jubilee of Mercy Pope Francis declared, "The Holy Door will become a Door of Mercy through which anyone who enters will experience the love of God who consoles, pardons, and instills hope." Prior to the official opening of the Jubilee Year, on November 29, 2015, Pope Francis opened the Holy Door at the Cathédrale Notre-Dame in Bangui, while visiting the Central African Republic. On December 8, 2015, the Pope formally inaugurated the Jubilee with the opening of the Holy Door at St. Peter's Basilica in Rome. On Gaudete Sunday, one week later, he opened the Holy Door at the Archbasilica of St. John Lateran. The other papal basilicas soon followed. The Holy Door at St Paul's "Outside-the-Walls" was opened by the archpriest of that Basilica, Cardinal James Harvey. Pope Francis later opened the Holy Door at Basilica di Santa Maria Maggiore and at the Caritas center near Rome's central train station.

A unique feature of the Jubilee was that, as a sign of communion of the whole church, the Pope requested that every diocese in the world open a similar “Door of Mercy” for the local celebrations of the Jubilee, thus making it unnecessary for pilgrims to travel to Rome in order to obtain the jubilee indulgence.
