= Monumento al Partigiano, Bergamo =

Coordinates: 45°41′41″N 9°40′12″E

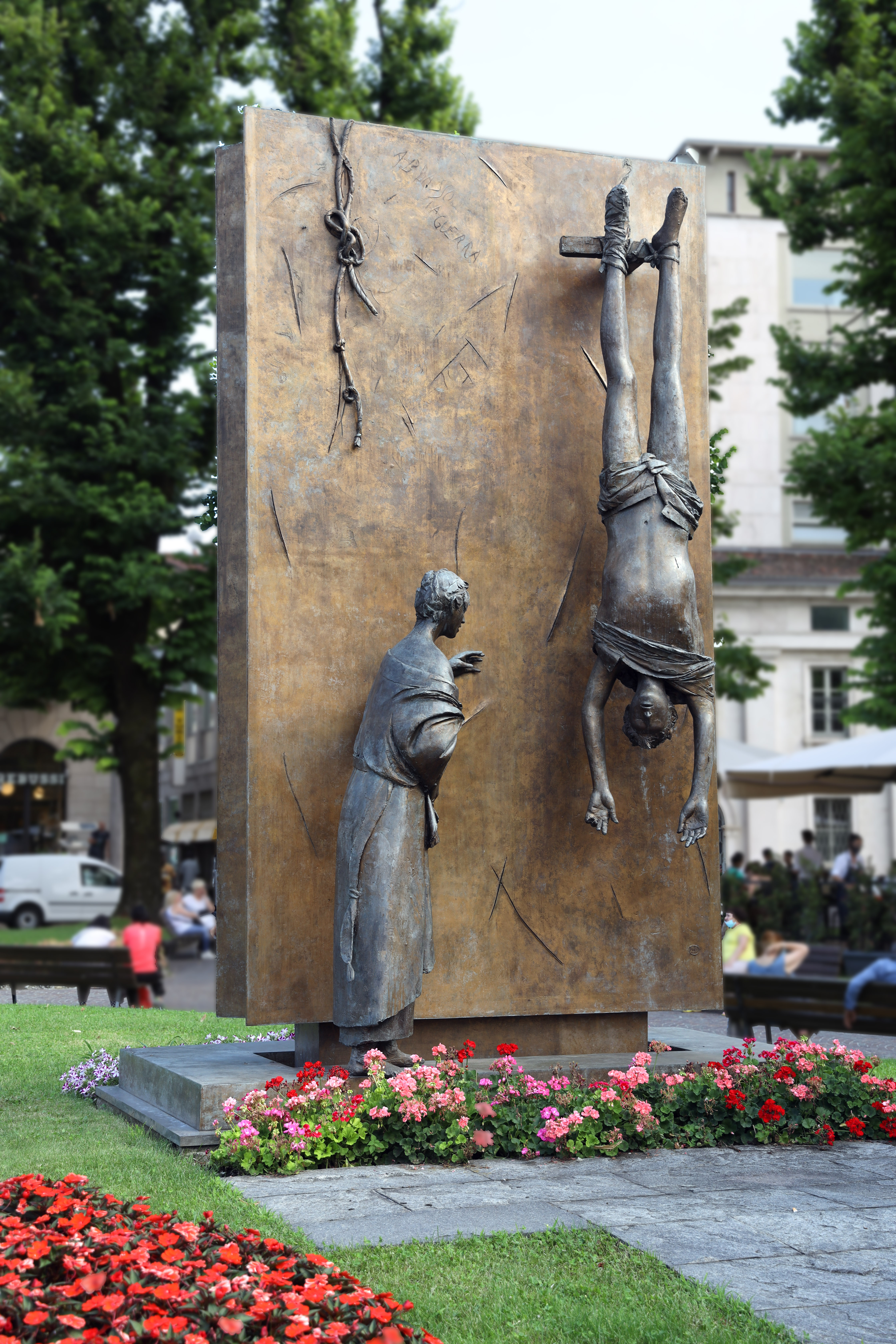
Monument to the Partisan

The Monumento al Partigiano or Monument to the Partisan is a bronze monument in Piazza Matteotti, Bergamo, Italy. The monument by Giacomo Manzù commemorates the deaths of partisans killed by fascist forces during the World War II. The monument is in the same park, in a spot just northeast of the monument of Vittorio Emanuele II, and across the viale from the Teatro Donizetti.

== Description ==
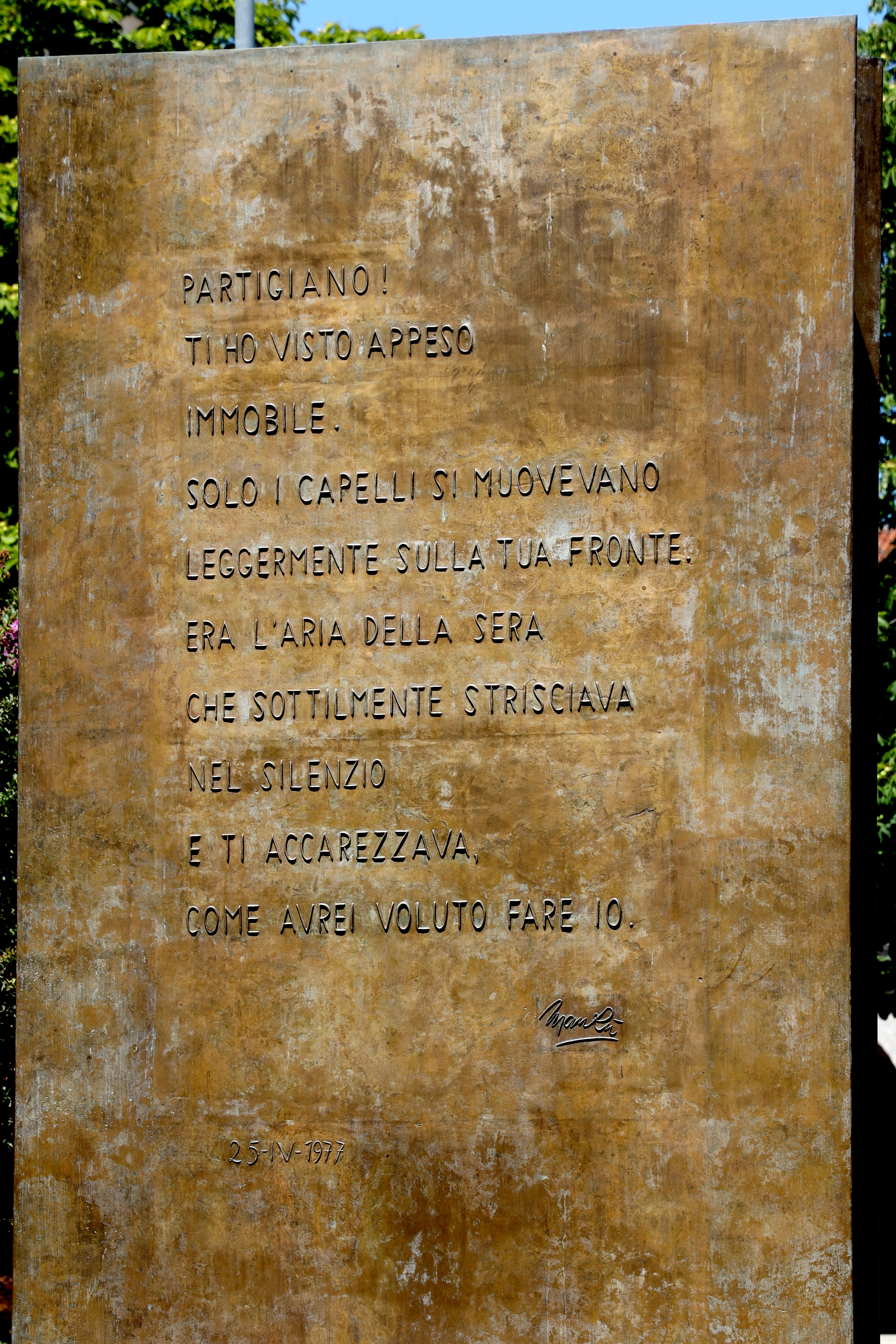

The monument consists of a tall rectangular bronze slab: on one side is a poetic inscription by the sculptor, and on the other are two human figures. The figures depict on the left, a young woman with short hair with an oversize gown that droops revealing one shoulder, steps forward as if to touch the figure on the right, which is a young man, apparently limp and dead, tied by his feet to a trestle with his shirt falling down to his shoulder and arms drooping down. On the bronze wall of the slab, above the girl is a noose-like tangle of rope. Other markings appear twig like on the surface. On the opposite side is a poem.

Partisan!
I saw you hanging
Still.
Only the hair moved
Lightly on your forehead.
It was the evening air
Which subtly crept into the silence
And caressed you,
As I would have liked to do.
Manzu
25 IV 1972

== History ==
Some sources indicate, Manzu, native to Bergamo, had been forced to resign his appointment at the Brera Academy in 1942, after displeasure with his submissions to an art exhibition in Rome that year, and moved to Clusone till the end of hostilities. In 1972, he was approached by the municipal authorities about this commission, and the sculpture was donated to the city and inaugurated in 1977.

The image has similarities to one of the images, depicting the death of St Peter (crucified upside-down) found on Manzu's Door of Death installed in 1964 at the entrance of St Peter's Basilica. The image also recalls the pictures of the dead Mussolini, his mistress and two aides, displayed hanging upside down in Piazzale Loreto of Milan on 28 April 1945.
