= Giacomo Manzù =

Italian sculptor (1908–1991)

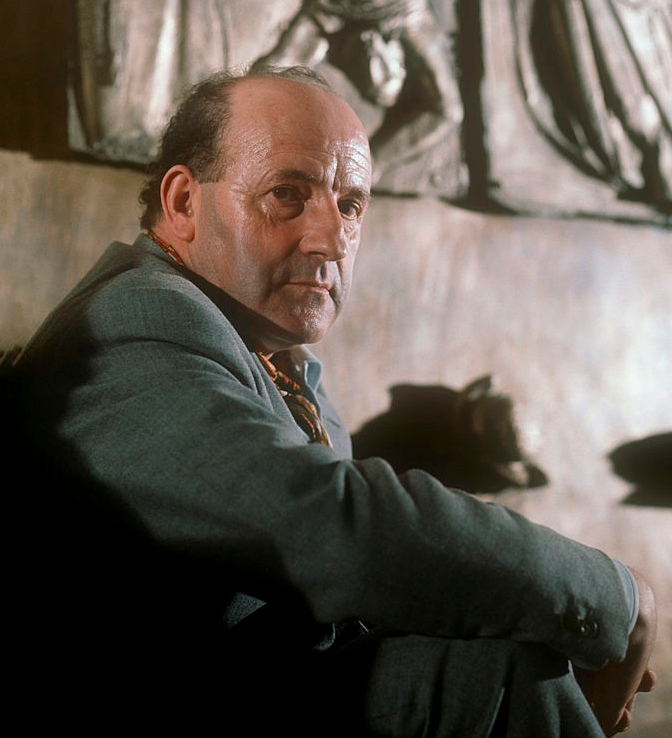
- Manzù in 1964
- Born: 22 December 1908
- Died: 17 January 1991 (aged 82); Aprilia
- Occupation: Sculptor, printmaker, graphic artist, visual artist, artist, theatre designer
- Children: Pio Manzù
- Website: www.giacomomanzu.it

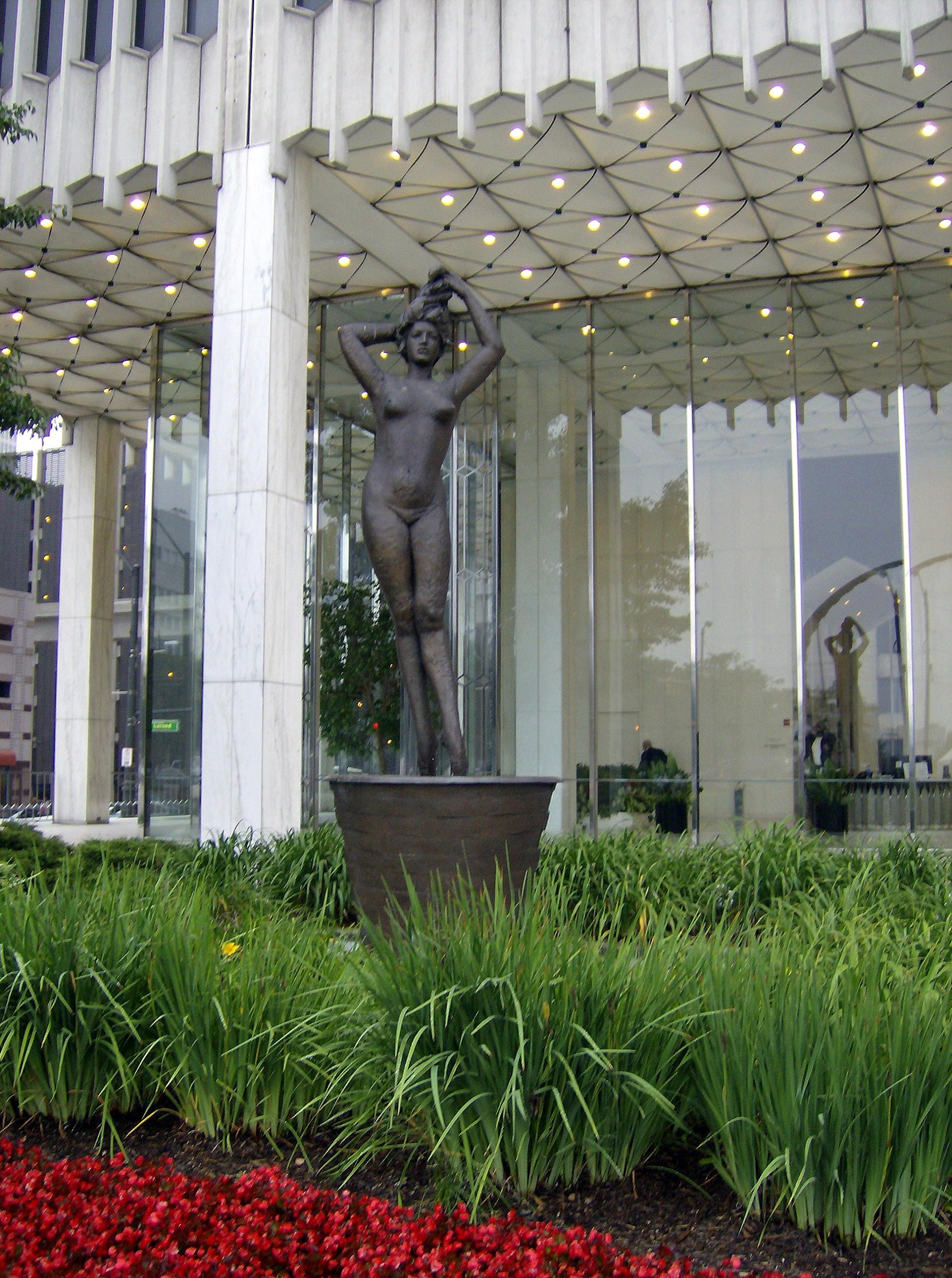
Passo di Danza, Giacomo Manzù's eleven foot bronze sculpture, modeled on his wife, in Detroit near Woodward Avenue and Fort Street

Giacomo Manzoni (22 December 1908 – 17 January 1991), known professionally as Giacomo Manzù, was an Italian sculptor.

== Biography ==
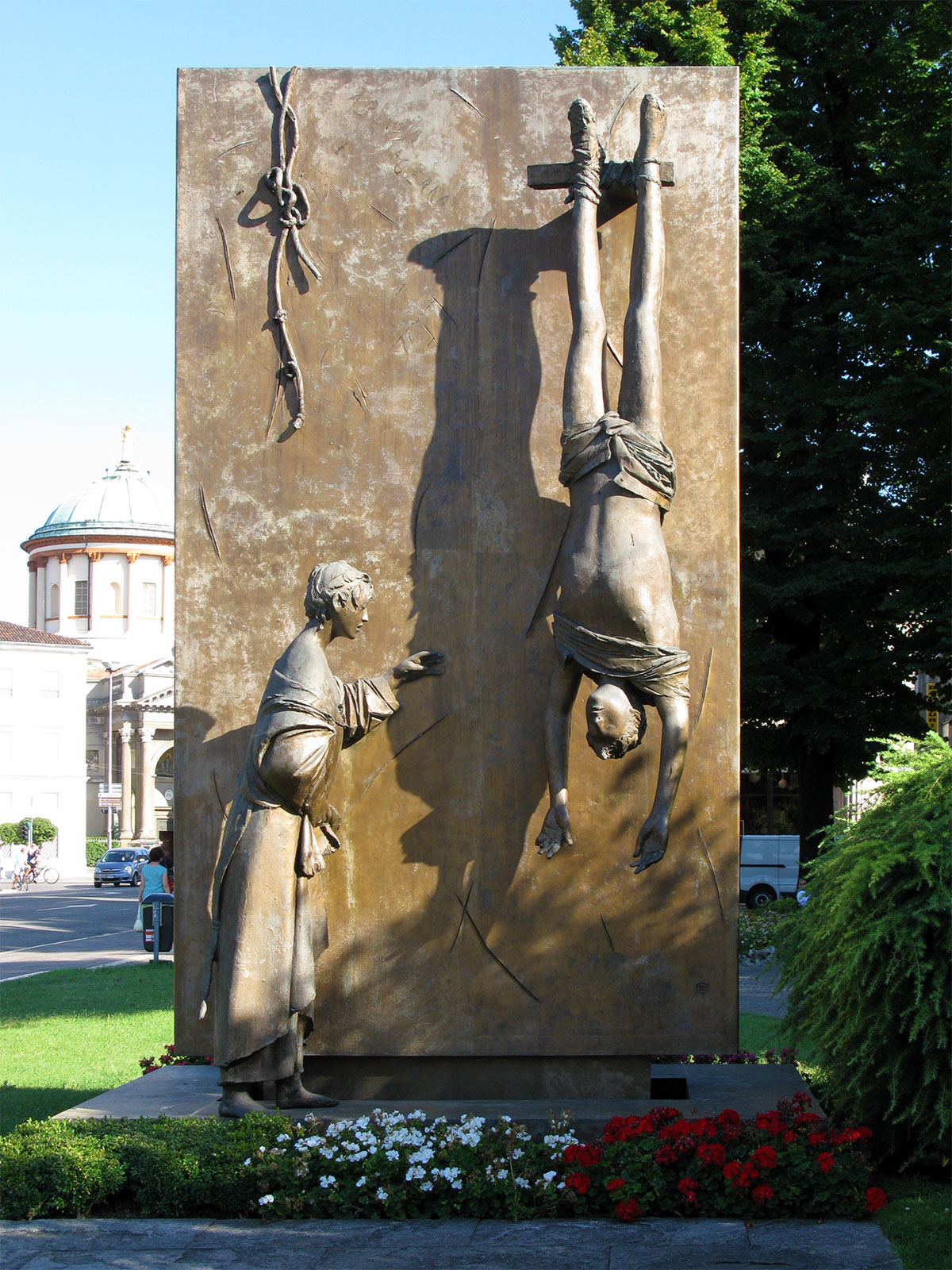
Monument to the Partisan, Bergamo (1977).

Manzù was born in Bergamo. His father was a shoemaker and sacristan. Other than a few evening art classes, he was self-taught in sculpture, and later became a professor himself. He started working with wood during his military service in Verona in 1928; later, after a short stay in Paris, he moved to Milan, where architect Giovanni Muzio commissioned him the decoration of the chapel of Università Cattolica del Sacro Cuore (1931–1932). In 1933 he exhibited a series of busts at the Triennale di Milano, which granted him national popularity. In 1933, he completed the reliefs for the Monument to the Brothers Calvi located in front of the city hall of Bergamo, a monument inaugurated by Mussolini and the poet Gabriele D'Annunzio. The following year he held a personal exhibition in Rome with the painter Aligi Sassu, with whom he shared a studio.

In 1939 Manzù started a series of bronze bas-reliefs about the death of Jesus Christ; the works, exhibited in Rome in 1942, were criticized by the Fascist government and the ecclesiastical authorities. In 1940 he obtained a teaching position in the Accademia di Brera in Milan, but later he moved to the Accademia Albertina in Turin. During World War II Manzù moved to Clusone, returning to teach at Brera after the end of the conflict. He held his teaching position until 1954 when he moved to Salzburg, where he lived until 1960. Here he met Inge Schabel, a ballerina and his future wife, who was the model of a large number of his portraits and sculptures. He was commissioned in 1957 to design the central doors for Salzburg Cathedral, completed in bronze in 1959. In 1964 he completed perhaps his most important work, the "Doors of Death" for St. Peter's Basilica in Rome, the first new doors in the cathedral in 500 years. That same year, he moved to Ardea, near Rome, in a locality now rechristened Colle Manzù in his honour.

He created two sculptures in stiacciato relief at the Rockefeller Center on the former Italian building in the 1960s, one titled "The Immigrant" and the other "A Fruitful Harvest". In 1977 he completed a "Monument to the Partisan" in Bergamo. One of his last works was a 6m-tall sculpture called "Mother and Child" which is situated in the gardens of the UN headquarters in New York City. Italy gifted the piece to the United Nations in 1989.

He was the subject of a famous photographic portrait by Yousuf Karsh and in 1968 his friendship with Pope John XXIII was documented in the book "An Artist and The Pope" by Curtis Bill Pepper.

In the late 1960s, Manzù started to work also as scenographer.

His works are displayed in prestigious museums and private collections throughout the world. Tasende Gallery inaugurated their first location in La Jolla, California on 1 June 1979 with a solo presentation of Manzu's work, attended by his wife Inge.

Although he was an atheist, he was a personal friend of Pope John XXIII and had important liturgical commissions for the Vatican. In the United States, architect Minoru Yamasaki commissioned him the Passo di Danza (dance step) sculpture at the One Woodward Avenue building in Detroit. He also carved the Nymph and Faun at Wayne State University's McGreagor Memorial Sculpture Garden.

His son Pio was an automotive and industrial designer. Giacomo Manzù died in Rome on 17 January 1991, aged 82.

== Awards ==
- Gold medal: Italian Order of Merit for Culture and Art (1981)
- Lenin Peace Prize (1965)
- Knighthood: Order of Merit of the Italian Republic (1960)

== Sources ==
- Ralf van Bühren (2010). "Giacomo Manzù". In Bautz, Traugott (ed.). Biographisch-Bibliographisches Kirchenlexikon (BBKL) (in German). Vol. 31. Nordhausen: Bautz. cols. 826–835. ISBN 978-3-88309-544-8.
