= World Day of the Poor =

Annual Roman Catholic event

- Observed by: Catholic Church
- Date: Sunday before the Feast of Christ the King
- 2025 date: 16 November
- 2026 date: 15 November
- 2027 date: 14 November
- 2028 date: 19 November
- Frequency: Annual
- First time: 19 November 2017

The World Day of the Poor is a Roman Catholic observance, celebrated on the 33rd Sunday of Ordinary Time since 2017. It was established by Pope Francis in his Apostolic Letter, Misericordia et Misera, issued on 20 November 2016 to celebrate the end of the Extraordinary Jubilee of Mercy.

== Description ==
The World Day of the Poor was first observed on 19 November 2017, with the theme, "Let us love, not with words but with deeds". In his message for that first World Day of the Poor, Pope Francis said that "the Our Father is the prayer of the poor". He held a special Mass in St. Peter’s Basilica, followed by a free lunch in the adjacent Paul VI Hall, in several Catholic colleges, and in other Vatican venues. During the week preceding the World Day of the Poor, free specialized medical services were offered at a mobile clinic.

The day was also observed in other countries, including India, Poland, and Canada, with special Masses, free meals for the poor, and other initiatives.

In India, the Archbishop of Bombay, Cardinal Oswald Gracias, launched an "ACTS" (Actively Called to Serve) project, which involved distributing bags to parishes, in which people could donate food (e.g., grain or sugar) and toiletries for the poor. Cardinal Gracias said that "Our Lord gave us the striking example of simplicity and poverty in His own life. He taught His disciples to value poverty."

In some Polish cities, the day was preceded by a "Week of the Poor", when some Catholics prayed for those in need and organized various forms of aid for them. In Kraków, the services of a beautician and hairdresser were offered to the less fortunate, as were culinary, theatrical, and musical workshops. In Poznań, film showings and meetings were organized at centers for the poor or homeless, while at a "help bus" they could receive a warm meal, clothing, and nursing assistance.

In Canada, the Archbishop of Vancouver, J. Michael Miller, initiated a 4-day email prayer campaign for those in need, and encouraged conversations with the homeless, donations, charitable help, visits to the sick and to prisoners, consolation of the bereaved, and the giving of alms to the poor.
