= Door of the Dead in St. Peter's Basilica =

Bronze door in Vatican City

Door of the Dead
- Door of Death
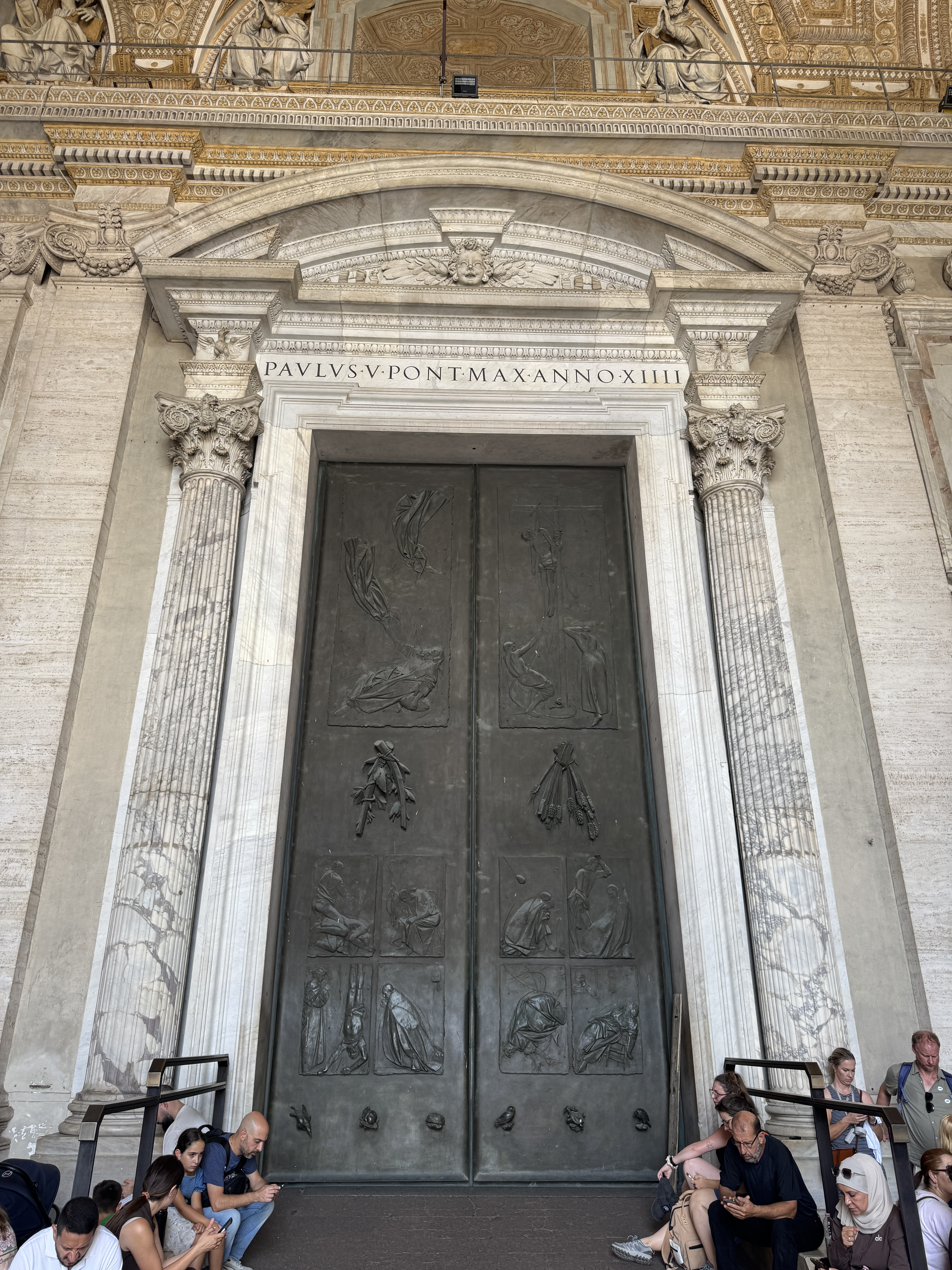
- Artist: Giacomo Manzù
- Completion date: 1964
- Medium: Bronze
- Subject: Death
- Location: Vatican City

The Door of the Dead, also known as the Door of Death, is a bronze door sculpted by Giacomo Manzù between 1961 and 1964 by commission of Pope John XXIII. The door is located on the leftmost side of the narthex of St. Peter's Basilica, in the Vatican City, and leads to the interior of the basilica. It is called the Door of the Dead because it was traditionally used as an exit for funeral processions.

== Elements ==
The door is composed of ten panels which depict the Christian meaning of death. The panels are arranged in five rows and two columns. The top half of the door depicts the deaths of Jesus and Mary, spread across two panels. The two central panels show a vine branch and wheat, which are shown as being turned into wine and bread in symbolic tribute to the Eucharist. The bottom panels depict the deaths of Abel, Saint Joseph, Saint Peter, Pope John XXIII, Saint Stephen, Pope Gregory VII, and two allusions to the personification of Death. Beneath these depictions are a row of six animals: a blackbird, a dormouse, a hedgehog, an owl, a tortoise and a raven. The inside of the door shows the artist's dedication to Pope John XXIII, a portrayal of John XXIII receiving the bishops on the first day of the Second Vatican Council.

Manzù signed the work with the imprint of his right hand on the inside.

== Controversy ==
The door is considered to be Manzù's most controversial work. The corporeal depictions of death were considered disturbing by some Vatican officials, who preferred depictions of a more spiritual nature. Officials were also wary of Manzù's professed communist ideology and allusions to executions of fascists in the panels of the door. Despite these controversies, the door has remained in operation at the basilica.

== See also ==
- Index of Vatican City-related articles
