= Mercy =

Benevolence, forgiveness, and kindness

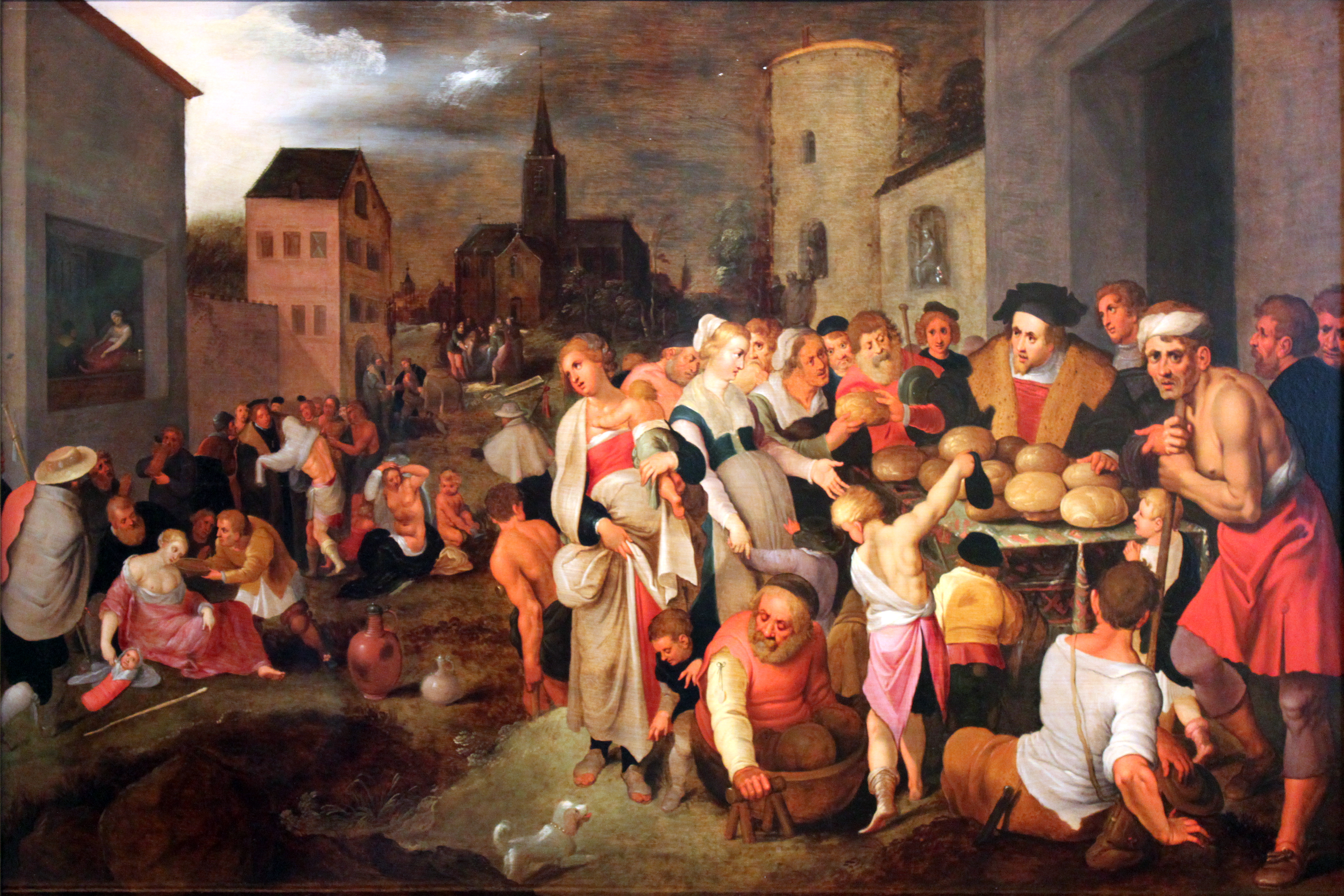
The Seven Works of Mercy, by Frans II Francken, 1605.

Mercy (/ˈmɜːr.si/, MUR-see; from Middle English, from Anglo-French merci, from Medieval Latin merced-, merces "price paid, wages", from Latin merc-, merxi "merchandise") is benevolence, forgiveness, and kindness in a variety of ethical, religious, social, and legal contexts.

In the social and legal context, mercy may refer both to compassionate behavior on the part of those in power (e.g. mercy shown by a judge toward a convict), or on the part of a humanitarian third party (e.g., a mission of mercy aiming to treat war victims).

== Definition ==
"Mercy" can be defined as "compassion or forbearance shown especially to an offender or to one subject to one's power"; and also "a blessing that is an act of divine favor or compassion." "To be at someone's mercy" indicates a person being "without defense against someone."

== Law and ethics ==
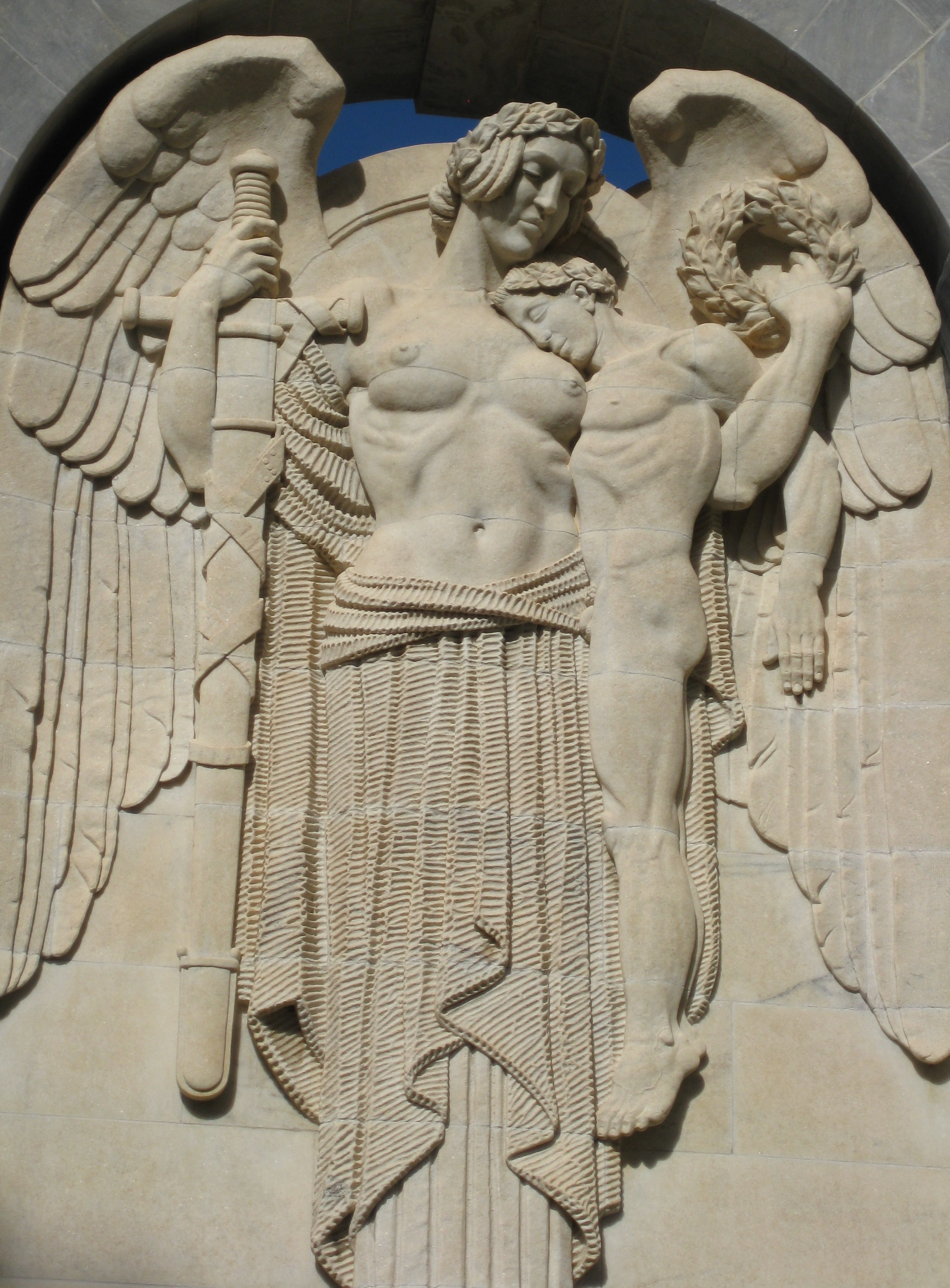
The Spirit of Compassion, commemorating World War I, South Australia, 1931

In a judicial context mercy is often termed "clemency". It is a sovereign prerogative that resides in the executive and is entirely discretionary. John Locke defined it as "the power to act according to discretion, for the public good, without the prescription of the Law, and sometimes even against it." The U.S. Court of Appeals for the Sixth Circuit explained that "The very nature of clemency is that it is grounded solely in the will of the dispenser of clemency. He need give no reasons for granting it or for denying it."

Burden of proof standards affects the leniency of the legal system.

== Religions ==
The concept of a merciful God appears in various religions, including Hinduism, Christianity, Judaism, and Islam. Performing acts of mercy as a component of religious beliefs is also emphasized through actions such as the giving of alms, care for the sick, and Works of Mercy.

=== Christianity ===
Hebrews 4:16 says, "So let us confidently approach the throne of grace to receive mercy and to find grace for timely help." Grace and mercy are similar in that both are free gifts of God and both are dispensed absent any merit on the part of the recipient. Grace is the favor of God, a divine assistance. Grace is what one receives that one does not deserve while mercy is what one receives when one does not get what one deserves.

An emphasis on mercy appears in the New Testament, for example in the Magnificat and Benedictus (Song of Zechariah), in Luke's Gospel, and in the Beatitudes in Matthew 5:7: "Blessed are the merciful, for they will receive mercy." In Ephesians 2:4–5 Apostle Paul refers to the mercy of God in terms of salvation: "God, who is rich in mercy... even when we were dead through our trespasses, made us alive together with Christ."

Psalm 117 calls upon all nations to praise the Lord on account of his "merciful kindness". This is quoted by the Apostle Paul in Romans 15:11 to show that God has now fulfilled this prophecy and promise through Jesus Christ, who has been merciful in giving his life as a sacrifice for his people, both Jew and gentile. 1 Peter 2:9–10 reads:

But you are a chosen race, a royal priesthood, a holy nation, God’s own people, in order that you may proclaim the mighty acts of him who called you out of darkness into his marvelous light. Once you were not a people, but now you are God’s people; once you had not received mercy, but now you have received mercy.

This devotional element of mercy as part of the Christian tradition was echoed by Saint Augustine who called mercy "ever ancient, ever new". The Works of Mercy (seven corporal and seven spiritual works) are part of the Catholic and Eastern Orthodox traditions.

==== Roman Catholicism ====
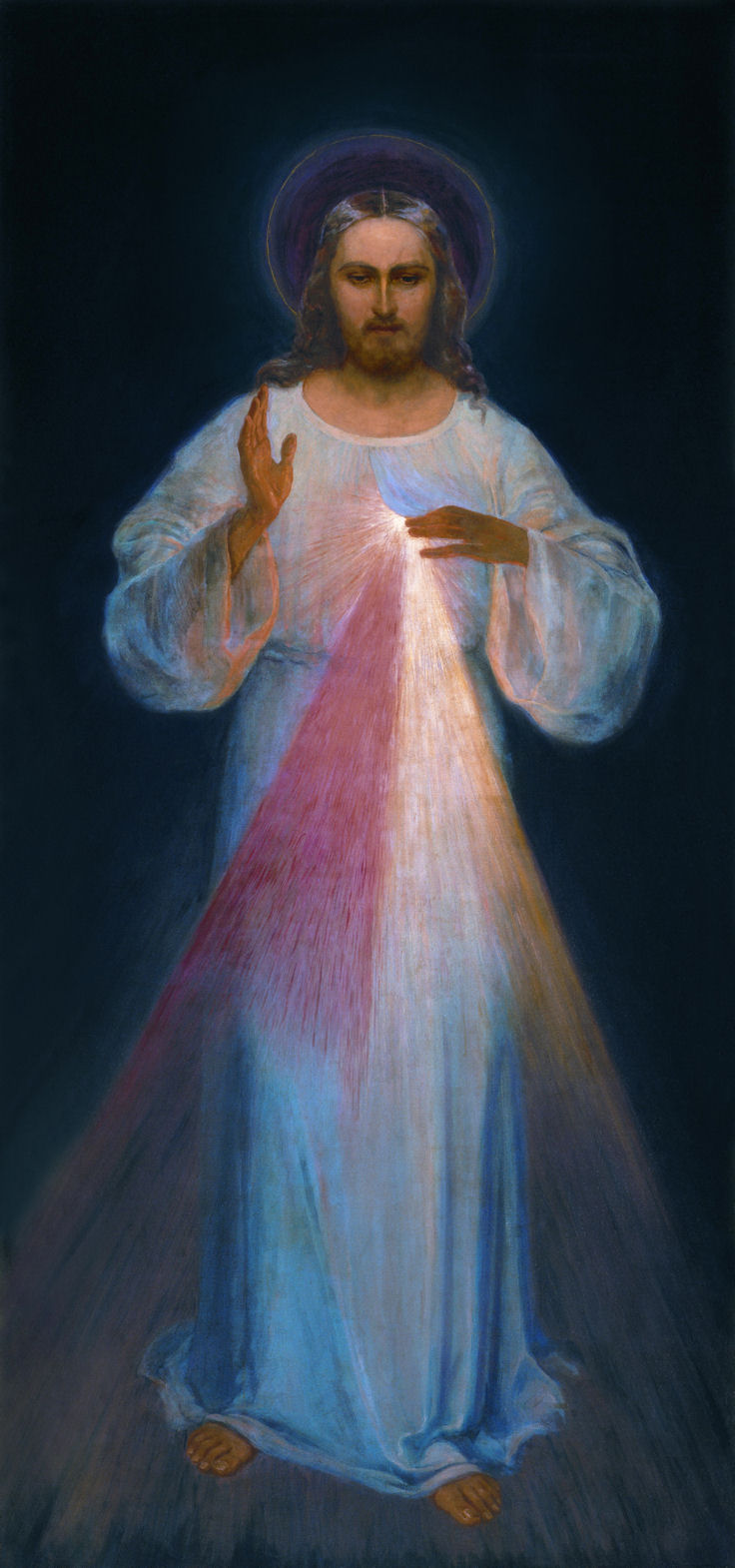
The first Divine Mercy image (c. 1934) painted according to the apparitions of Faustina Kowalska by Eugene Kazimierowski. Now permanently enshrined at the Divine Mercy Sanctuary of Vilnius, Lithuania

In the encyclical Dives in misericordia ("Rich in Mercy") Pope John Paul II examined the role of mercy—both God's mercy, and also the need for human mercy. He saw in the Parable of the Prodigal Son (Luke 15:11–32) "the essence of the divine mercy". Having squandered his patrimony, justice would dictate that the prodigal should only expect to be received back as a hireling. The figure of the father is analogous to God as Father, who goes beyond the requirements of justice to welcome his son with compassion.

The Catechism of the Catholic Church emphasizes the importance of the Works of Mercy. In Roman Catholic teachings the mercy of God flows through the work of the Holy Spirit. Roman Catholic liturgy includes frequent references to mercy, e.g., as in Kyrie eleison, Christe eleison: Lord have mercy, Christ have mercy.

Mercy has also been an important subject of Christian iconography. Since the Middle Ages, many representations in art encouraged people to practice the works of mercy and, as the art historian Ralf van Bühren explains using the example of Caravaggio, helped "the audience to explore mercy in their own lives".

In the 20th century, there was new focus on mercy in the Roman Catholic Church, partly due to the Divine Mercy devotion. The primary focus of the Divine Mercy devotion is the merciful love of God and the desire to let that love and mercy flow through one's own heart towards those in need of it.

Pope John Paul II was a follower of the Divine Mercy devotion, due to Saint Mary Faustina Kowalska (1905–1938), who is known as the Apostle of Mercy.

A number of Roman Catholic shrines are specifically dedicated to Divine Mercy, e.g. the Basilica of Divine Mercy in Krakow Poland, and the National Shrine of The Divine Mercy (Stockbridge, Massachusetts). During the dedication of the Basilica of Divine Mercy, John Paul II quoted the Diary of Faustina and called mercy the "greatest attribute of God Almighty".

The first World Apostolic Congress on Mercy was held in Rome in April 2008 and was inaugurated by Pope Benedict XVI.

In 2015, at St. Peter's Basilica, in a Papal Bull of Indiction entitled Misericordiae Vultus ("The Face of Mercy"), Pope Francis proclaimed a Special and Extraordinary Holy Year Jubilee Year of Mercy, from December 8, 2015: Solemnity of the Immaculate Conception of the Blessed Virgin Mary, until November 21, 2016: the Solemnity of Our Lord Jesus Christ the King. The theme of the Extraordinary Jubilee was taken from Luke 6:36, "Merciful, Like the Father".

=== Islam ===
In Islam the title "Most Merciful" (Al-Raheem) is one of the names of Allah and "Most Compassionate" (Al-Rahman), is the most common name occurring in the Quran. Rahman and Rahim both derive from the root Rahmat, which refers to tenderness and benevolence. As a form of mercy, the giving of alms (zakat) is the fourth of the Five Pillars of Islam and one of the requirements for the faithful.

=== Judaism ===
The concept of mercy encompasses two terms in Hebrew. Chesed, which is also translated as 'loving-kindness' and 'goodness', is the seventh of the thirteen defining attributes of God.

The other, rachamim, is also translated as 'compassion' (or because its noun form is grammatically plural, as 'mercies'). Rachamim is the fourth of the thirteen attributes. Exodus 34:6 says: "The Lord, the Lord, a God merciful and gracious, slow to anger, and abounding in steadfast love and faithfulness." This is also emphasized in the context of the Babylonian exile in Isaiah: "For the Lord has comforted his people, and will have compassion on his suffering ones. But Zion said, 'The Lord has forsaken me, my Lord has forgotten me.' Can a woman forget her nursing child, or show no compassion for the child of her womb? Even these may forget, yet I will not forget you." (Isaiah 49:13–15) Also: "It is good to pray and fast, to be merciful and just." (Tobit 12:8) When David, because of his sin, was told to choose between a three-year famine, pursuit by his enemies for three months, or a three-day pestilence, he chose the pestilence, saying, "Let us fall by the hand of God, for he is most merciful; but let me not fall by the hand of man." (2 Samuel 24:14) Psalm 103:8 praises God for his mercy.

=== Other religions and beliefs ===
Kwan Yin the bodhisattva of mercy and compassion, is one of the best known and most venerated Bodhisattva in Asia.

Karuṇā (often translated as "compassion") is part of the beliefs of Hinduism, Buddhism, and Jainism. Karuṇā is present in all schools of Buddhism and in Jainism it is viewed as one of the reflections of universal friendship.

The spiritual teacher Meher Baba described God as being "all-merciful and eternally benevolent" in his O Parvardigar prayer, and he held that we can approach God through the "invocation of His mercy."

== Literature ==
- In Shakespeare's The Merchant of Venice, Portia, disguised as young lawyer Balthazar, begs Shylock to show mercy to her client Antonio:

The quality of mercy is not strain'd.
It droppeth as the gentle rain from heaven
Upon the place beneath. It is twice blest:

It blesseth him that gives and him that takes.

- In O. Henry's A Retrieved Reformation, safecracker Jimmy Valentine betrays his identity and burglary skills in order to free a child accidentally trapped in a bank vault. A detective who has been pursuing him witnesses Valentine crack the safe. As Valentine subsequently surrenders, the detective pretends not to recognize him and walks away.

== See also ==
- Accountability – Concept of responsibility in ethics, governance and decision-making
- Blackstone's ratio – 1760s legal maxim by William Blackstone
- Christian universalism – Christian belief that all will be reconciled to God
- Clementia – Roman goddess of clemency
- Mercy Corps – American humanitarian aid NGO founded 1979
- Pardon – Forgiveness of a crime by the government
- Thirteen Attributes of Mercy – Divine Attributes with which, according to Judaism, God governs the world
- Virgin of Mercy – Depiction of the Virgin Mary sheltering a group using her outspread cloak
- Works of Mercy – Meritorious works or acts in morals
