= Ralf van Bühren =

German church and art historian

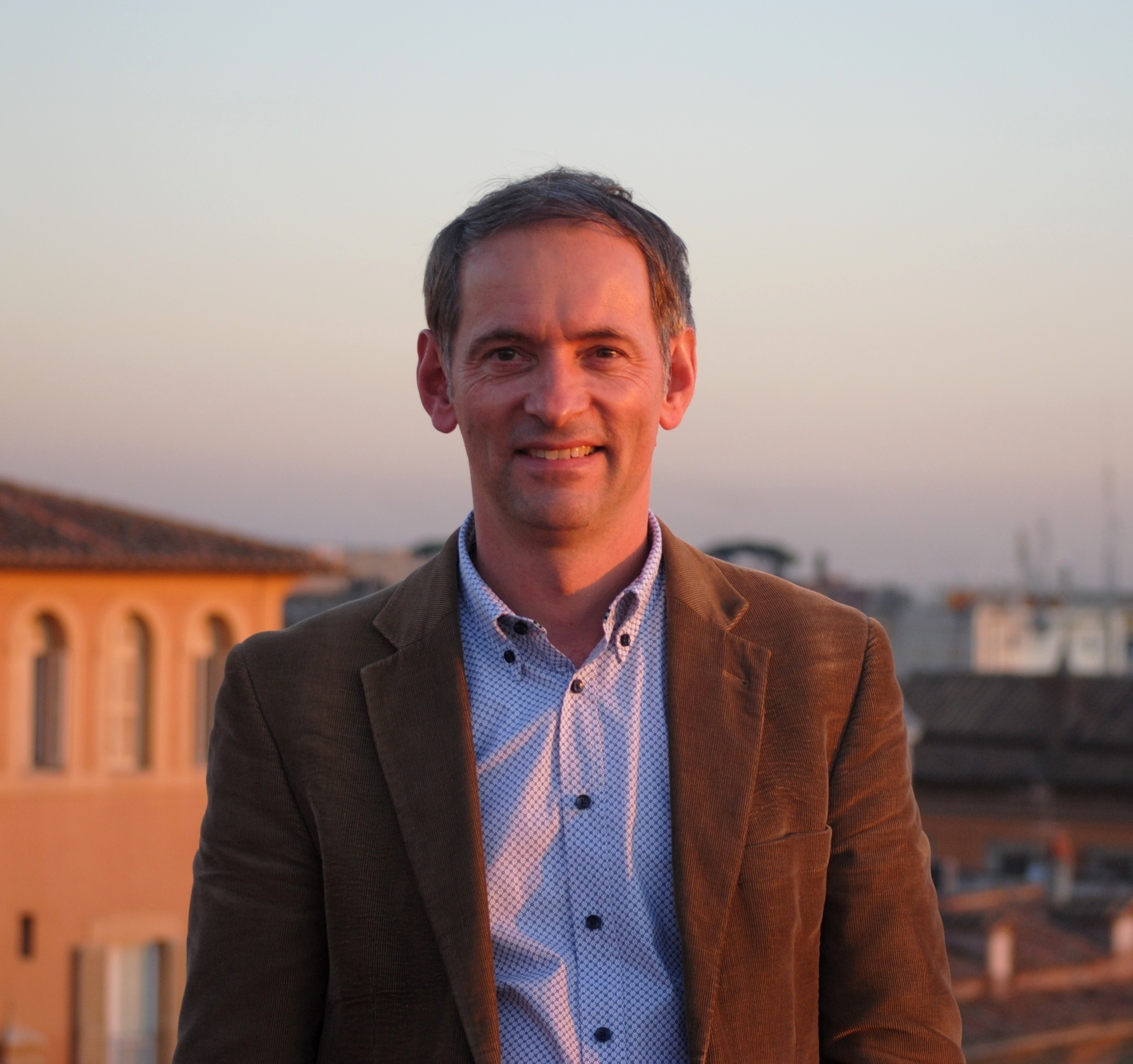
- Bühren at the top of Palazzo dell’Apollinare, Rome
- Born: 3 February 1962
- Citizenship: German
- Known for: Christian art, History of church architecture

Academic background
- Education: LMU Munich; University of Cologne; University of Trier
- Doctoral advisors: Joachim Gaus (PhD in Art History), Johannes Grohe (PhD in Theology)

Academic work
- Institutions: Pontificia Università della Santa Croce, Rome
- Website: buhren.com

Ralf van Bühren (born 3 February 1962) is a German art historian, architectural historian, church historian, and theologian. He is professor of art history at the School of Church Communications at the Pontifical University of Santa Croce in Rome, and also lecturing at the Pontificia Università Gregoriana. His courses on Sacred Art and Architecture in Rome are open to students of US universities with campus in Rome.

His research and teaching specialize on the History and Theology of Christian Art and Architecture in general, as well as on Visual Studies, the hermeneutical problems of biblical and liturgical iconography, on the rhetorics of sacred art, on the liturgical space after the Second Council of Nicaea (787), the Council of Trent (1545‒1563) and the Vatican Council II (1962‒1965), and on the pastoral concern in Religious Tourism in particular.

== Early career ==
Ralf van Bühren was born in Bad Kreuznach. At the Max-Planck-Gymnasium in Trier, he finished his secondary school education in 1982. Between 1984 and 1991, van Bühren studied Art history at the University of Trier and LMU Munich. In Munich in 1988, he converted to the Roman Catholic Church.

In 1994, he received the PhD in Art history at the University of Cologne. His dissertation was published in 1998 as The works of mercy in art from the 12th to the 18th centuries. Iconographic changes caused by the early modern reception of rhetorics. The study explores image theory and visual rhetoric as driving forces for the persuasive mode in early modern art.

Between 1992 and 1995, van Bühren worked as pedagogical assistant in the Museumsdienst Köln at the Wallraf-Richartz Museum and Museum Ludwig in Cologne, in the data processing service of the Bildarchiv Foto Marburg, and as freelance collaborator in the Domforum Köln at the Cologne Cathedral and the 12 romanesque churches of Cologne.

From 1996 to 1998, he was chief copy Editor at the German publishing house Verlag Schnell & Steiner in Regensburg, whose founders (Hugo Schnell, Johannes Steiner) in 1934 invented the small-sized type of art guidebooks (“Kleine Kunstführer“), which today are produced a million times.

In 2006, van Bühren was awarded the doctorate degree in Theology at the Pontifical University of Santa Croce in Rome. He published his dissertation in 2008 in the series Konziliengeschichte (ed. by Walter Brandmüller) as Art and Church in the 20th century. The reception of the Second Vatican Council. The prologue was written by Friedhelm Hofmann, Bishop of Würzburg and at that time a member of the Pontifical Commission for the Cultural Heritage of the Church as well as of the Commission for Science and Culture of the German Bishops' Conference.

== Academic work ==
Since 2006, van Bühren is teaching Art History as professor at the Pontifical University of Santa Croce in Rome. The focus of his research and his lectures at the School of Church Communications is on Art and Architecture as Communication Media, at the School of Theology on Liturgical Art from Antiquity to the Present, including its implications for theology and Church history. At many universities, these subjects do not rate among the required courses within the teaching program of the studies of Catholic theology, although the Second Vatican Council asked to study the history and principles of Christian art. The Pontifical University of Santa Croce includes these issues in its teaching program of theological studies, also in communication studies.

From 2014 to 2022, he was consultant to the Pontifical Council for Culture. Since 2014, he is editorial board member of the peer-reviewed journal Church, Communication and Culture, edited by Santa Croce's School of Communications and published by Routledge (Taylor & Francis Group). Recently, van Bühren's communication studies explain the importance of art history for Religious Tourism, cultural journalism, religious correspondents and Church media relations.

His current lectures include courses on Christian Art and Architecture in Rome. From Antiquity to the Present (in English), open to students of US universities with campus in Rome. These courses intersperse classroom sessions with site visits. Students are encouraged to combine both the visual and contextual analysis of artworks.

Ralf van Bühren is a member of the Medieval Academy of America (Cambridge, MA), the International Center of Medieval Art (New York), the International Society for Research on the History of the Councils (Vienna, Rome and Bamberg; “Internationale Gesellschaft für Konziliengeschichtsforschung") and the Roman Institute of the Görres Society (RIGG).

== Main research ==
- History of Christian Art
- Liturgical Art. History from Antiquity to the Present
- Reception of the Bible in the Visual Arts (Biblical Iconography)
- Contemporary church architecture (20th and 21st centuries)
- Rhetoric of Art, Art as “locus theologicus”
- Visual Communication in Christian art and architecture

== Bibliography (selection) ==
- The invisible divine in the history of art. Is Erwin Panofsky (1892–1968) still relevant for decoding Christian iconography?, together with Maciej Jan Jasiński, in Church, Communication and Culture 9 (2024), pp. 1–36. DOI: 10.1080/23753234.2024.2322546.
- Revelation in the Visual Arts, in The Oxford Handbook of Divine Revelation, ed. by Balázs M. Mezei, Francesca Murphy and Kenneth Oakes, New York / Oxford: Oxford University Press, 2021, pp. 622–640 – READ ONLINE
- Tourism, religious identity and cultural heritage, special issue edited together with Lorenzo Cantoni and Silvia De Ascaniis, in Church, Communication and Culture 3 (2018), pp. 195–418
- Caravaggio's 'Seven Works of Mercy' in Naples. The relevance of art history to cultural journalism, in Church, Communication and Culture 2 (2017), pp. 63–87
- Contemporary Popes and Artists. Paradigms of Communication after the Second Vatican Council (1962–1965), in: Church Communications. Faces, People, Stories. Proceedings of the 8th Professional Seminar for Church Communications Offices on 16–18 April 2012 at the Pontifical University of Santa Croce in Rome, ed. by Alfonso Bailly-Baillière and Jorge Milàn Fitera, Roma 2014, pp. 227–234 (PDF file)
- Los Papas y los artistas modernos. La renovación de la actividad pastoral con los artistas después del Concilio Vaticano II (1962–1965), San José (Costa Rica): Ediciones Promesa 2012, ISBN 978-9968-41-216-2, English summary
- Papst Benedikt XVI. im Dialog mit Künstlern. Zur pastoralen Bedeutung des Künstlertreffens in der Sixtinischen Kapelle am 21. November 2009 im Kontext der modernen Kirchengeschichte, in: Annales theologici 25, 2011, pp. 305–315 – Download full text (PDF file)
- Moderner Kirchenbau als Bedeutungsarchitektur. Die Lichtkonzeption Dominikus Böhms (1880–1955) als Ausdruck einer mystagogischen Raumidee, in: »Liturgie als Bauherr«? Moderne Sakralarchitektur und ihre Ausstattung zwischen Funktion und Form, ed. by Hans Körner and Jürgen Wiener, Essen: Klartext Verlag 2010, pp. 241–256, ISBN 978-3-8375-0356-2 – READ ONLINE
- Spiritualität des Irdischen. Die weltanschauliche Botschaft im Werk von Joseph Beuys (1921–1986), in: Sakralität und Moderne, ed. by Hanna-Barbara Gerl-Falkovitz, Dorfen (Munich): Hawel Verlag 2010, pp. 197–230, ISBN 978-3-9810376-5-4
- Paul VI. und die Kunst. Die Bedeutung des Montini-Pontifikates für die Erneuerung der Künstlerpastoral nach dem Zweiten Vatikanischen Konzil, in: Forum Katholische Theologie 24, 2008, pp. 266–290
- Kunst und Kirche im 20. Jahrhundert. Die Rezeption des Zweiten Vatikanischen Konzils (Konziliengeschichte, Reihe B: Untersuchungen), Paderborn: Verlag Ferdinand Schöningh 2008, ISBN 978-3-506-76388-4, English summary and reviews
- Die Werke der Barmherzigkeit in der Kunst des 12.–18. Jahrhunderts. Zum Wandel eines Bildmotivs vor dem Hintergrund neuzeitlicher Rhetorikrezeption (Studien zur Kunstgeschichte, vol. 115), Hildesheim / Zürich / New York: Georg Olms Verlag 1998, ISBN 3-487-10319-2, English summary
