= 1605 in art =

Events from the year 1605 in art.

== Events ==
- (unknown)

== Paintings ==
Caravaggio, Madonna and Child with St. Anne 1605

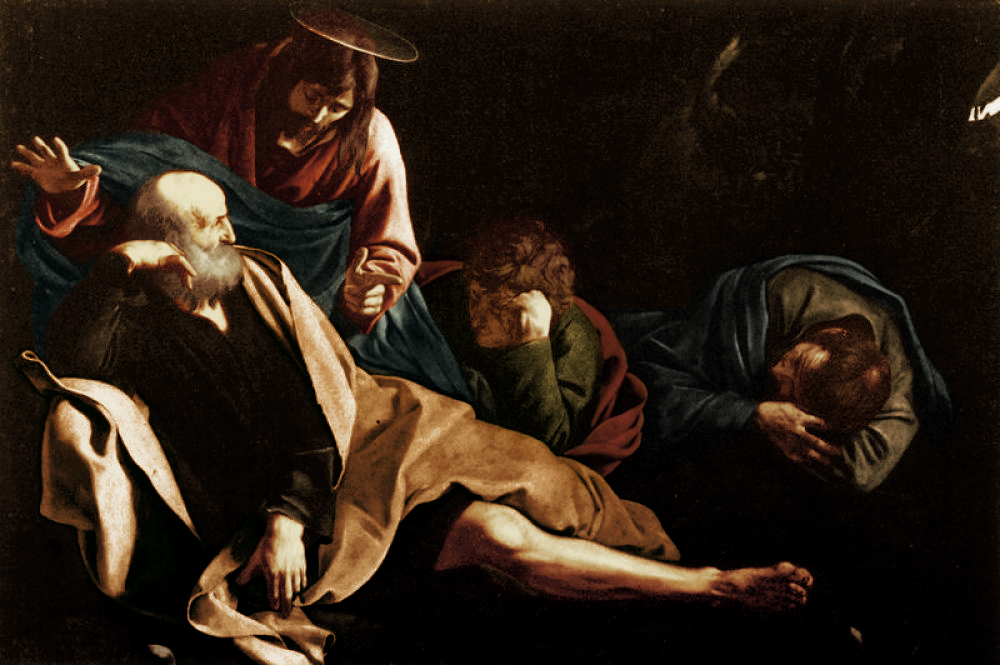
Caravaggio, Christ on the Mount of Olives 1605

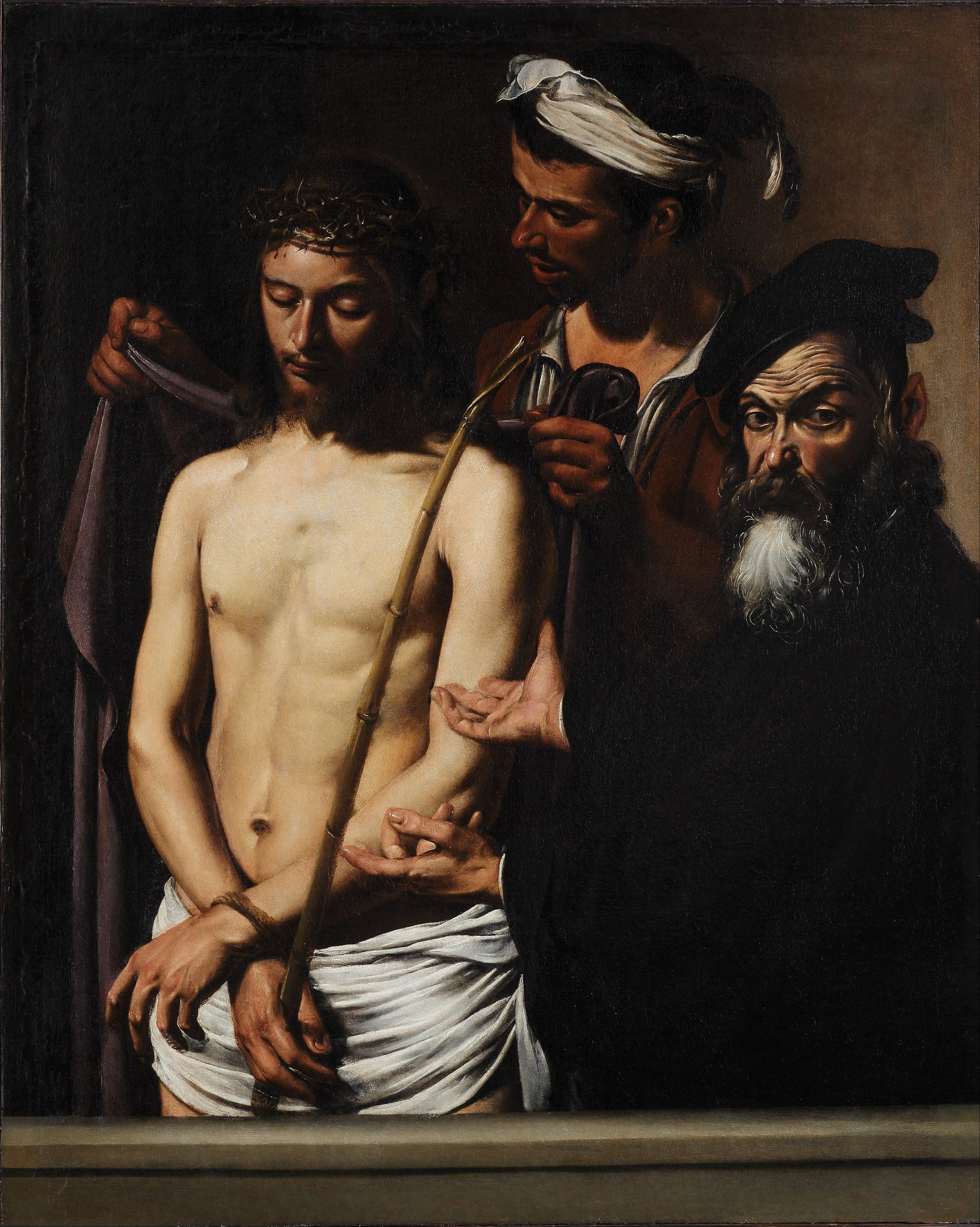
Caravaggio, Ecce Homo 1605

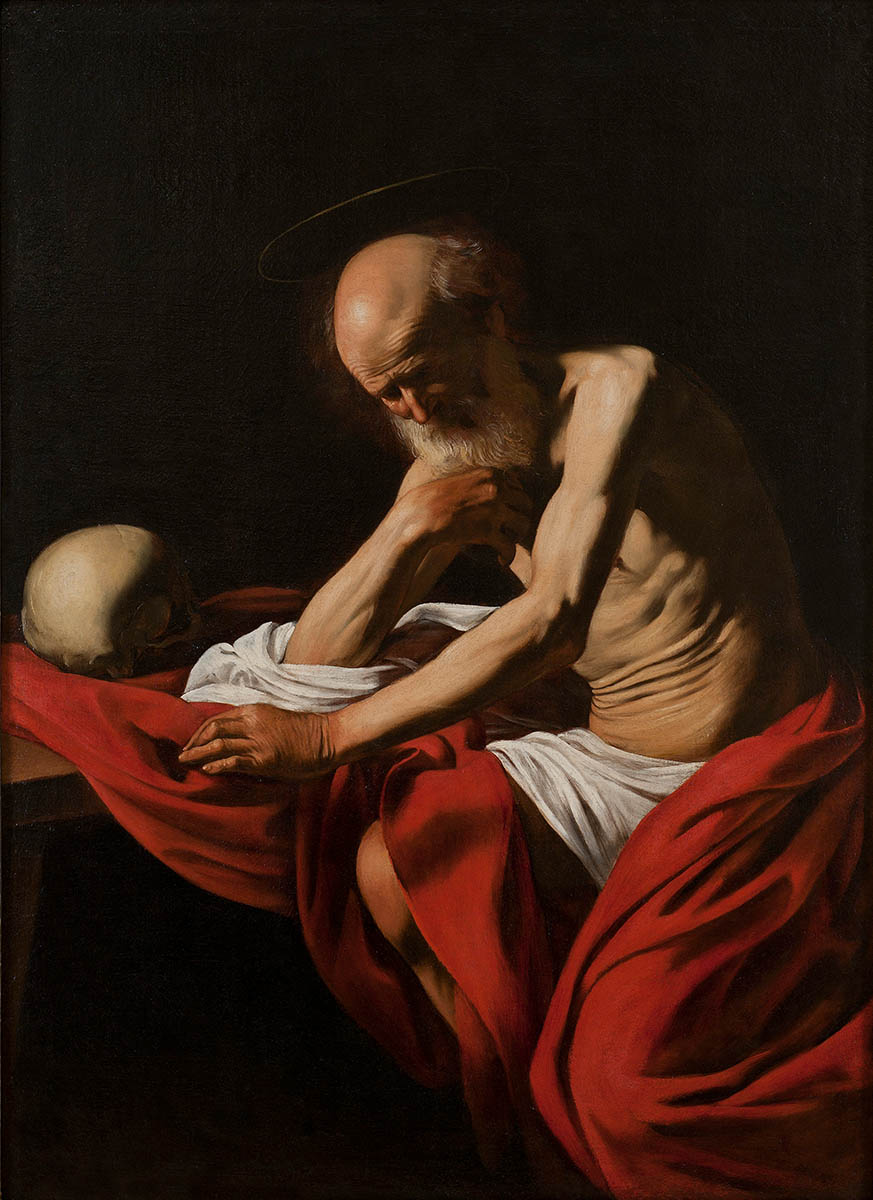
Caravaggio, Saint Jerome in Meditation 1605
- Caravaggio
  - Christ on the Mount of Olives
  - Ecce Homo
  - Saint Jerome in Meditation
  - Madonna and Child with St. Anne (Dei Palafrenieri)
- Domenichino (c.1604–05)
  - Landscape with fishermen, hunters and washerwomen (Christ Church Picture Gallery, Oxford)
  - Landscape with Fording (Doria Pamphilj Gallery, Rome)
  - Portrait of Cardinal Girolamo Agucchi (Uffizi, Florence)
  - A Virgin with a Unicorn (Palazzo Farnese, Rome; fresco to a design by Carracci)
- Nicholas Hilliard - miniature portrait of Charles, Lord Howard of Effingham
- Guido Reni - David with the Head of Goliath
- Peter Paul Rubens - The Fall of Phaeton (approximate date of original completion)
- Joachim Wtewael - The Judgement of Paris (approximate date)
- Domenico Zampieri - portrait of Cardinal Agucchi

== Births ==
- February 17 - Luca Ferrari, Italian painter (died 1654)
- May 29 - Hendrick van Anthonissen, Dutch marine painter (died 1656)
- August - Ercole Procaccini the Younger, Italian painter of altarpieces, later director of the academy established by the Procaccini (died 1675/1680)
- date unknown
  - Ottavio Amigoni, Italian painter, active in Brescia (died 1661)
  - Jacopo Baccarini – Italian painter of the Baroque period born in Reggio Emilia (died 1682)
  - Carlo Biffi, Italian painter (died 1675)
  - Carlo Bozzoni, Italian painter (died 1657)
  - Carlo Cornara, Italian painter born in Milan (died 1673)
  - Francesco Cozza, Italian painter (died 1682)
  - Pedro de Camprobín, Spanish painter of animals, fruit, and flowers (died 1674)
  - Felice Ficherelli, Italian painter active in Tuscany (died 1660)
  - Girolamo Forabosco, Italian painter (died 1679)
  - Pietro Liberi, Italian painter nicknamed il Libertino (died 1687)
  - Francesco Maffei, Italian painter characterized by provincial stylistic quirks (died 1660)
  - Crestano Menarola, Italian painter and printmaker (died 1687))
  - Pierre Patel ("le bon Patel"), French Baroque era painter (died 1676)
  - Cheng Sui, Chinese landscape painter during the Ming Dynasty (died 1691)
- probable
  - Adriaen Brouwer, Flemish genre painter (died 1638)
  - Pedro de Campolargo, Flemish-born Spanish painter and engraver (died 1675)
  - Dirk van Delen, Dutch Baroque Era painter (died 1671)
  - Luigi Primo, Flemish painter of portraits and altarpieces (died 1667)
  - Bartolommeo Scaligero, Italian painter (date of death unknown)
  - 1605-1610: Abraham Willemsens, Flemish painter of history and genre paintings (died 1672)

== Deaths ==
- February 11 - Stradanus, Flanders-born mannerist painter (born 1523)
- March 17 - Pieter Bast, Dutch cartographer, engraver and draftsman (born 1550)
- date unknown
  - Cristofano dell'Altissimo, Italian painter primarily working in Florence (born 1525)
  - Biagio Betti, Italian painter (born 1535)
  - Giovanni Contarini, Venetian painter (born 1549)
  - Giacomo Lauro, Italian painter (born 1550)
  - Gregorio Pagani, Italian painter active mainly in Florence (born 1558)
  - Felice Riccio, Italian painter (born 1542)
  - Giacomo Rocca, Italian painter (born 1592)
- probable - Leonard Fryer, sergeant-painter to Queen Elizabeth I of England (date of birth unknown)
