= 1687 in art =

Events from the year 1687 in art.

== Events ==
- September 26 – An Ottoman Turk ammunition dump inside the Parthenon at Athens is ignited by Venetian bombardment. The resulting explosion severely damages the building and its sculptures.

== Paintings ==
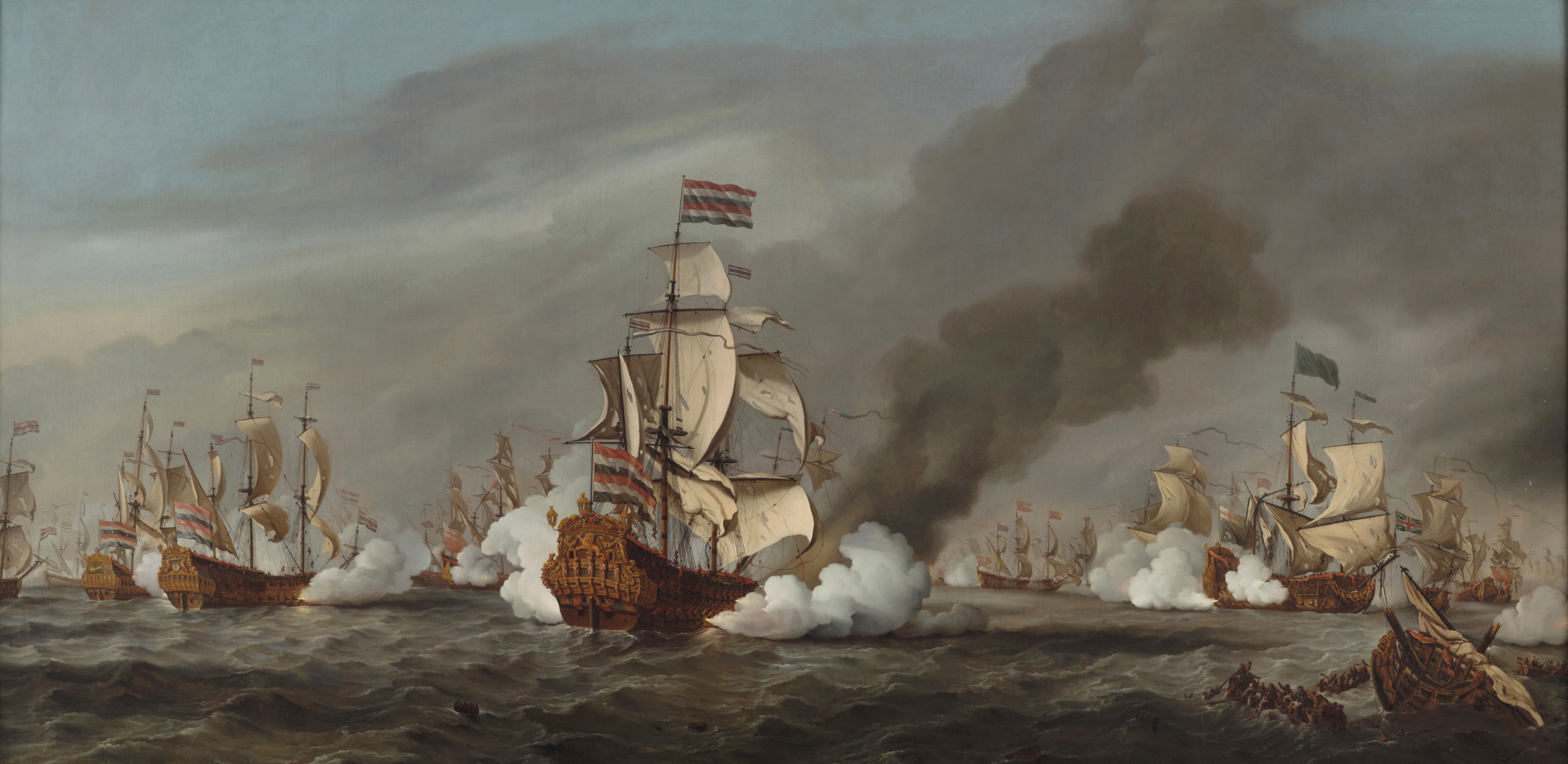
van de Velde – Battle of the Texel

- Godfrey Kneller – The Chinese Convert
- Carlo Maratta – Madonna and Child with St. Stanislaus Kostka (Sant'Andrea al Quirinale, Rome)
- Willem van de Velde – The 'Gouden Leeuw' at the Battle of the Texel, 21 August 1673
- Alida Withoos – Pineapple (painting of the first pineapple bred in Europe; not extant)

== Births ==
- April 13 – Sigismund Streit, German merchant and patron of the arts (died 1775)
- June 6 – Giambattista Pittoni, Italian painter of religious, historical, and mythological subjects (died 1767)
- date unknown
  - Pietro Anderlini, Italian painter of the Rococo period (died 1755)
  - Jean Duvivier, French medallist (died 1761)
  - Egrikapili Mehmed Rasim Efendi, Ottoman calligrapher (died 1756)
  - Gaetano Fanti, Italian fresco painter (died 1759)
  - Thomas-Joachim Hébert, French ébéniste and furniture designer (died 1773)
  - Jin Nong, Chinese painter of mei blossoms, one of the Eight Eccentrics of Yangzhou (died 1763/1764)
  - Arnold Frans Rubens, Flemish Baroque painter specialized in cabinet pictures of landscapes and battle scenes (died 1719)
  - Huang Shen, Chinese painter (died 1772)
  - Pieter Vanderlyn, American colonial painter (died 1778)
  - Jacob van Huysum, Dutch botanical artist (died 1740)

== Deaths ==
- February 3 – Bernhard Keil, Danish painter (born 1624)
- June – Juriaen van Streeck, Dutch Golden Age painter (born 1632)
- September 10 – Willem Wissing, Dutch portrait artist (born 1656)
- October 18 – Pietro Liberi, Italian painter nicknamed il Libertino (born 1605)
- November 18 – Anton Janson, Dutch typographer and printmaker (born 1620)
- date unknown
  - Samuel Bernard, French miniature painter and engraver (born 1615)
  - Giacomo di Castro, Italian painter (born 1624)
  - François Collignon, French engraver, print-seller and publisher (born 1609)
  - Angelo Michele Colonna, Italian painter of frescoes (born 1604)
  - Nicolas Frémery, French sculptor (date of birth unknown)
  - Simon de Leal Leon, Spanish painter (born 1610)
  - Marco Liberi, Italian painter of mythologic and historic cabinet paintings (born 1640)
  - Crestano Menarola, Italian painter and printmaker (born 1605))
  - Hubertus Quellinus, Flemish Baroque engraver (born 1619)
  - Francesco Rosa, Italian painter (date of birth unknown)
