= 1675 in art =

Events from the year 1675 in art.

== Events ==
- Joseph Parrocel settles in Paris, where he will make his reputation as a painter.
- Sculptor Balthasar Permoser goes to Florence to work for Giovanni Battista Foggini.

== Paintings ==
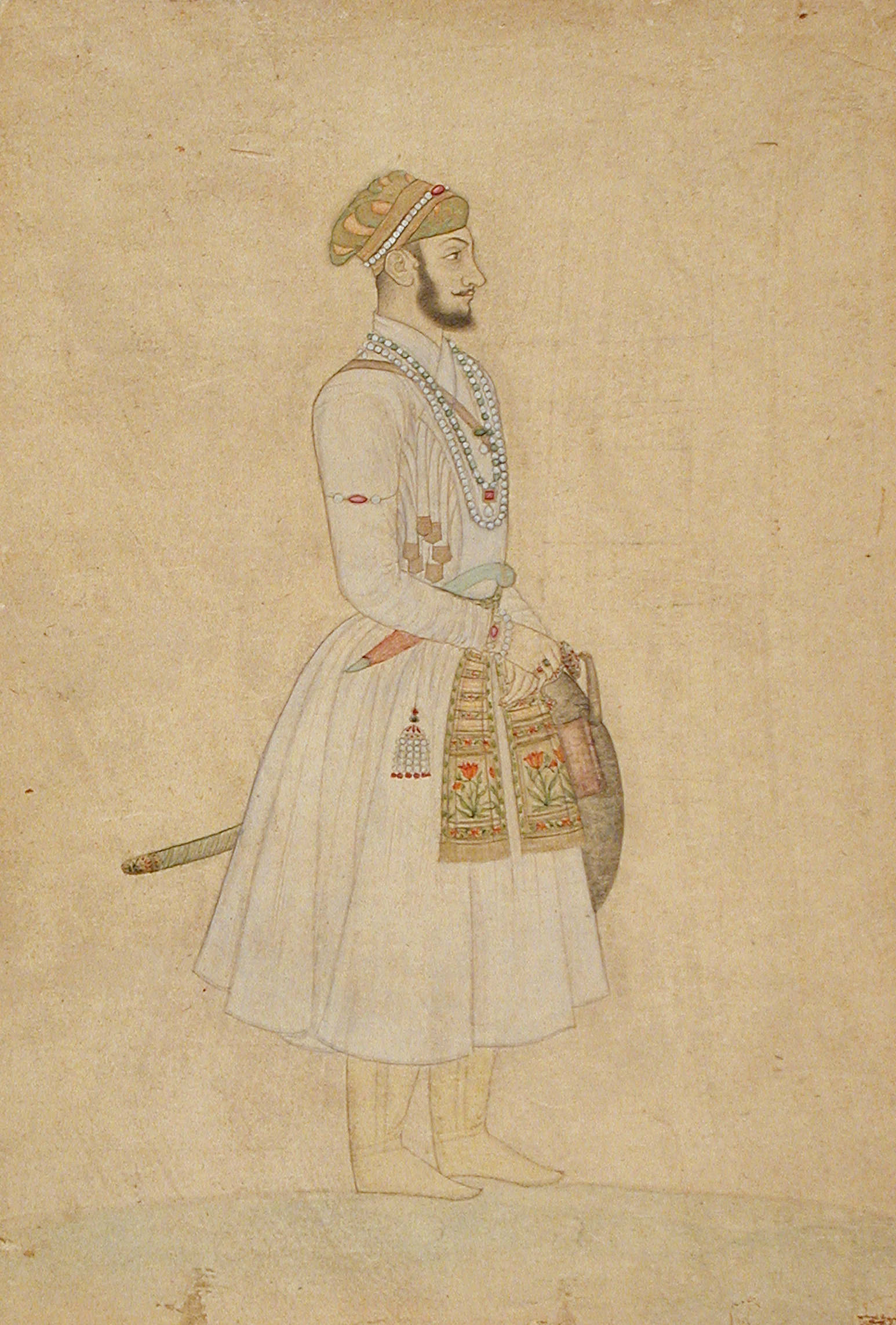
Artist unknown – Emperor Shah Alam Bahadur when Prince Muhammad Muazzam, Los Angeles County Museum of Art

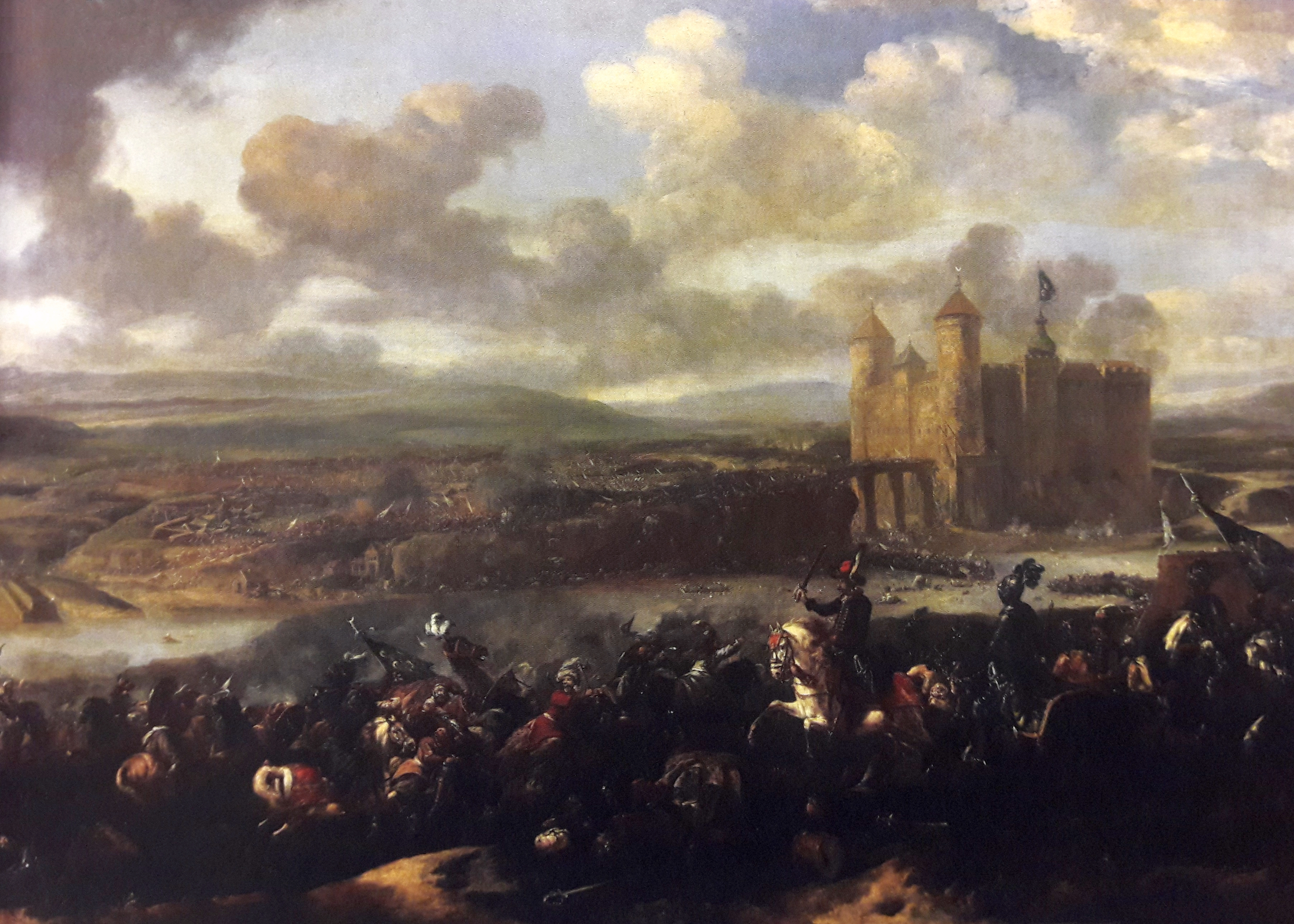
Jan van Huchtenburg – Battle of Khotyn in 1673, Wawel Castle

- Giovanni Domenico Cerrini – The Virgin Mary Triumphing over Heresy and Fall of the Rebel Angels (ceiling fresco, Santa Maria della Vittoria, Rome)
- Claude Lorrain – The Landing of Aeneas
- Hendrick Danckerts – Palace of Whitehall from St James's Park
- Jan de Baen - The Corpses of the De Witt Brothers (completed)
- Jan de Bray – The governors of the guild of St. Luke, Haarlem, 1675 (the painters' guild)
- Cornelis Norbertus Gysbrechts
  - Quodlibet
  - Trompe-l'œil with violin, painter's implements and self-portrait
- Jan van Huchtenburg – Battle of Khotyn in 1673 (approximate date)
- Jan Siberechts – A View of Longleat
- John Michael Wright
  - Triple portrait of the actor John Lacy in character
  - Portrait of Judge Jeffreys

== Births ==
- February 7 - Hugh Howard, Irish portrait-painter and collector of works of art (died 1737)
- April 29 – Giovanni Antonio Pellegrini, Italian decorative and mural painter from Venice (died 1741)
- June 23 – Louis de Silvestre, French painter (died 1760)
- October 7 - Rosalba Carriera, Venetian Rococo painter especially of portrait miniatures (died 1757)
- date unknown
  - Francesco Ange, Italian painter (died 1757)
  - Aureliano Milani, Italian painter and teacher in Bologna (died 1749)
  - Giuseppe Zola, Italian painter of landscapes with small figures (died 1744)
- probable
  - Charles Jervas, Irish portrait painter, translator, and art collector (died 1739)
  - James Thornhill, English history painter (died 1734)

== Deaths ==
- January – Jacob van Huchtenburg, Dutch painter (born 1644)
- February 9
  - Gerrit Dou (or Gerard Dow), Dutch painter especially of genre paintings (born 1613)
  - Ambrosius Brueghel, Flemish painter (born 1617)
- April 25 – Claude Lefebvre, French painter and engraver (born 1633)
- May 25 – Gaspard Dughet, French painter (born 1615)
- May 30 - José Antolínez, Spanish painter of the Baroque period (born 1635)
- August 15 – Pietro Ricchi, Italian painter of the altarpiece for a church in Lucca (born 1606)
- October – Hendrick Cornelisz. van Vliet, Dutch painter especially of church interiors (born 1611/1612)
- November – Allaert van Everdingen, Dutch painter and printmaker in etching and mezzotint (born 1621)
- November 14 (or 1680) – Ercole Procaccini, Italian painter of altarpieces, later director of the academy established by the Procaccini (died 1605)
- December 13 - Francesco Vaccaro, Italian painter of landscapes and engraver (born 1636)
- December 15 – Johannes Vermeer, Dutch painter (born 1632)
- date unknown
  - Carlo Biffi, Italian painter of the Baroque period (born 1605)
  - Hendrick Bogaert, Dutch painter (born 1630)
  - Francesco Boschi, Italian painter, active mainly in Florence (born 1619)
  - Filippo Brizzi, Italian painter (born 1603)
  - Giovanni Battista Caccioli, Italian figure painter in quadratura (born 1623)
  - Antonio Vela Cobo, Spanish Baroque painter, sculptor and gilder (born 1629)
  - Vincenzo Dandini, Italian painter of the Baroque period active in Florence (born 1607)
  - Hans Ulrich Franck, German historical painter and etcher (born 1603)
  - Andrea di Leone, Italian painter of battle scenes (born 1596)
  - Jacob Levecq, Dutch Golden Age painter (born 1634)
  - Abraham van Diepenbeeck, Dutch painter of the Flemish School (born 1596)
  - Lucas Vorsterman, Dutch Baroque engraver (born 1595)
- probable
  - Pedro de Campolargo, Flemish-born Spanish painter and engraver (born 1605)
  - Domenico Gargiulo, Italian painter of landscapes (born 1609/1610)
  - Pieter Neeffs II, Flemish Baroque painter who specialized in architectural interiors of churches (born 1620)
  - Jacob Willemszoon de Wet, Dutch painter (born 1610)
