= 1748 in art =

Events from the year 1748 in art.

== Events ==
- The Paris Salon first introduces a jury.
- Patience Lovell, the first recognized American-born sculptor, marries Joseph Wright.

== Works ==
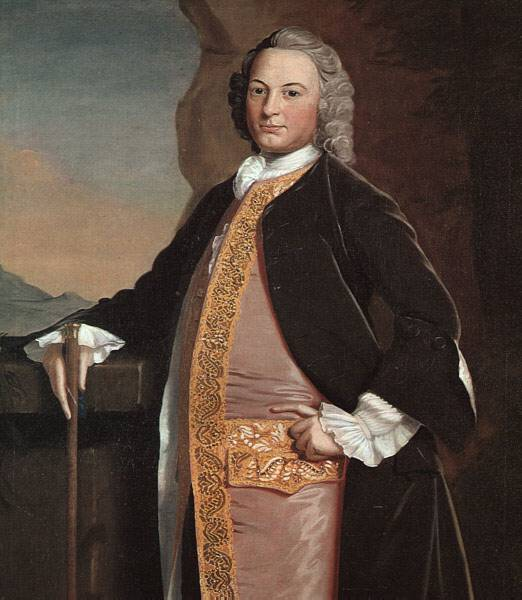
Robert Feke - Portrait of William Bowdoin

- Canaletto – The South Façade of Warwick Castle (Thyssen-Bornemisza Museum, Madrid)
- Maurice Quentin de La Tour – Marie Leszczyńska, Queen of France and Nazarre (pastels)
- Robert Feke – Portrait of William Bowdoin
- Thomas Gainsborough – Landscape in Suffolk
- William Hogarth – The Gate of Calais, or O, the Roast Beef of Old England

== Awards ==
- Prix de Rome (for sculpture) – Augustin Pajou

== Births ==
- May 22 – Thomas Roberts, Irish Landscape artist (died 1778)
- June 22 – John Carter, English draughtsman and architect (died 1817)
- August 30, Jacques-Louis David, French painter (died 1825)
- September 26 – Johann Sebastian Bach, German painter and grandson of the composer (died 1778)
- October 9 – Jacob Adam, Austrian copper etcher (died 1811)
- October 16 – Augustin Dupré, French engraver of French currency and medals (died 1833)
- October 13 – Johann Dominicus Fiorillo, painter and art historian (died 1821)
- date unknown
  - Antonio Carnicero, Spanish painter in the Neoclassical style (died 1814)
  - Christina Chalon, Dutch painter and etcher (died 1808)
  - Marie-Anne Collot, French sculptor (died 1821)
  - Rosalie Duthé, French courtesan and artists' model (died 1830)
  - Charles Eschard, French painter, draftsman and engraver (died 1810)
  - Pierre-Charles Jombert, French painter (died 1825)
  - Louis Masreliez, Swedish painter and interior designer (died 1810)
  - John Ramage, Irish American goldsmith and miniaturist (died 1802)
  - Dionys van Dongen, Dutch painter (died 1819)
  - Marten Waefelaerts, Flemish 18th century landscape painter (died 1799)
  - 1748/1749: Henry Pelham, American painter, engraver, and cartographer (died 1806) (drowned)

== Deaths ==
- April 12 – William Kent, English architect and designer (born 1685)
- May 5 – Alessandro Galli Bibiena, Italian architect and painter, eldest son of Ferdinando Galli Bibiena (born 1686)
- June 11 – Felice Torelli, Italian from a family of painters, painter of altarpieces (born 1667)
- August 14 – Thomas Germain, French silversmith (born 1673)
- September 15 – Johann Georg Schmidt, Austrian Baroque painter (born 1685)
- date unknown
  - Ferdinando del Cairo, Italian painter of the Baroque (born 1666)
  - Giovanni Casini, Italian portrait painter and sculptor (born 1689)
  - Giovanni Battista Lama, Italian painter, active mainly in Naples (born 1673)
  - Giovanni Pietro Ligario, Italian painter of historical pictures for churches and private collections (born 1686)
  - Henry Scheemakers, Flemish sculptor (born unknown)
  - Robert van Audenaerde, Flemish painter and engraver (born 1663)
