= 1603 in art =

Events from the year 1603 in art.

== Events ==
- August 28 - Painter Giovanni Baglione files suit in Rome for libel against Caravaggio, Orazio Gentileschi, Ottavio Leoni and Filipo Trisegni in connection with some unflattering poems circulated around the city over the preceding summer. Caravaggio continues to criticise Baglione's work in court and is held in the Tor di Nona prison for a few weeks before being placed under house arrest.

== Paintings ==
Caravaggio, The Entombment of Christ

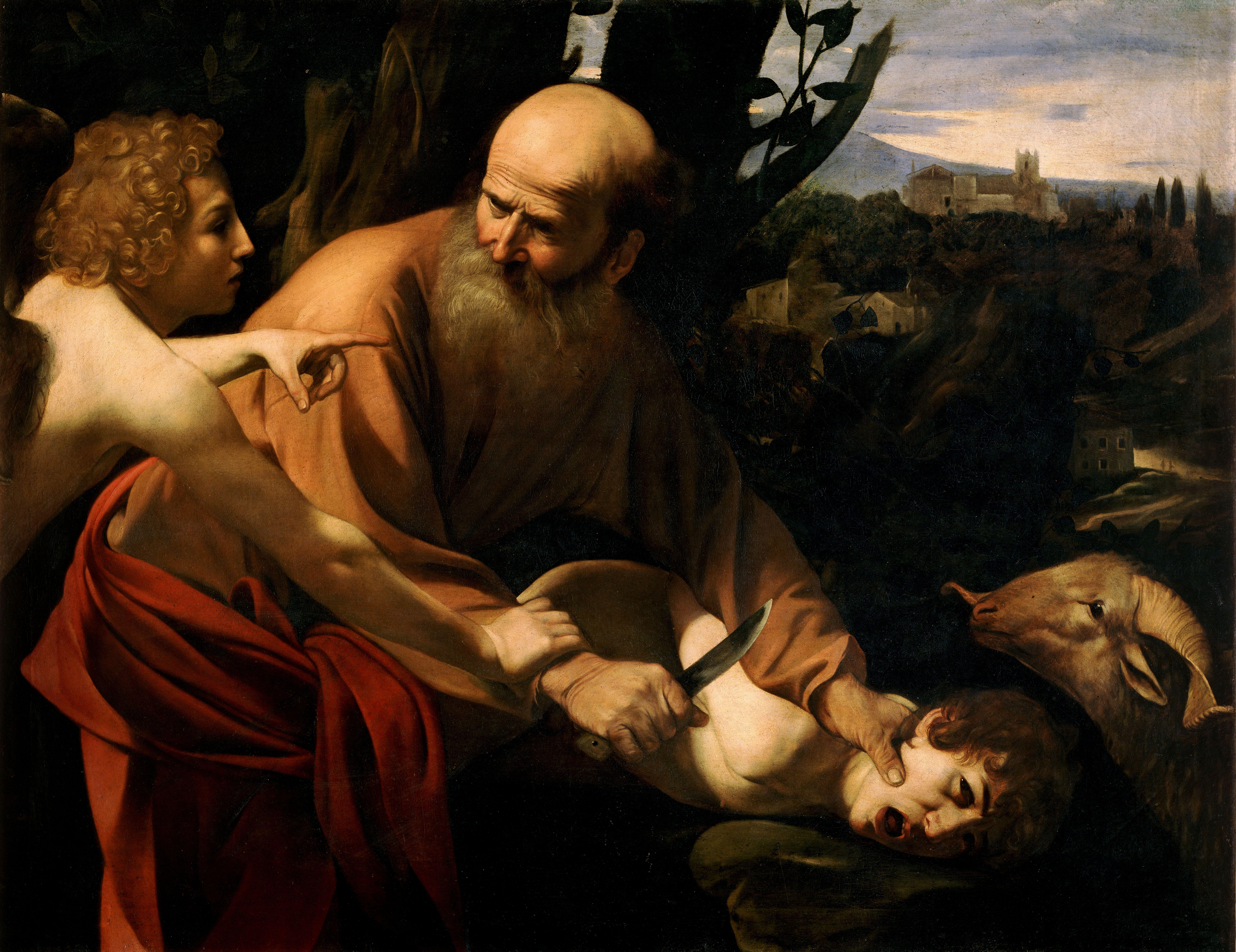
Caravaggio, Sacrifice of Isaac
- Caravaggio
  - The Entombment of Christ (1602-1603)
  - Sacrifice of Isaac (Uffizi)
- Peter Paul Rubens - Portrait of a Young Woman
- Tawaraya Sōtatsu (with calligrapher Honami Kōetsu) - Poem scroll with deer
- Andrea Vicentino - Battle of Lepanto (Doge's Palace, Venice)

== Births ==
- March 2 - Pietro Novelli, Italian painter, architect and stage set designer (died 1647)
- June 3 - Pietro Paolini, Italian painter of still lifes and cabinet pictures (died 1681)
- date unknown
  - Pieter Jansz van Asch, Dutch painter (died 1678)
  - Cornelis Bloemaert, Dutch painter and engraver (died 1692)
  - Jan Gerritsz van Bronckhorst Dutch painter and engraver of the Baroque period (died 1661)
  - Paolo Antonio Barbieri, Italian painter who was the brother of Guercino (died 1649)
  - Filippo Brizzi, Italian painter (died 1675)
  - Giovanni Battista Carlone, Italian painter active mainly in Genoa (died 1684)
  - Pietro della Vecchia, Italian painter of grotesque paintings and portraitures (died 1678)
  - Hans Ulrich Franck, German historical painter and etcher (died 1675)
  - Mario Nuzzi, Italian painter specializing in still life painting of flower arrangements (died 1673)
  - Paulus Pontius, Flemish engraver (died 1658)
  - Giovanni Quagliata, Italian painter of frescos and large canvases depicting historical and religious subjects (died 1673)
- probable
  - Adriaen Hanneman, Dutch painter best known for his portraits of the exiled British royal court (died 1671)
  - Aert van der Neer, Dutch painter (died 1677)
  - Abraham Willaerts, Dutch marine painter (died 1669)

== Deaths ==
- July 23 - Santi di Tito, Italian painter of Late-Mannerist or proto-Baroque style (born 1536)
- August/September - Hendrik van Steenwijk I, Dutch painter, earliest-known painter of architectural interiors (born 1550)
- December 4 - Marten de Vos, Antwerp painter and draughtsman (born 1532)
- date unknown
  - Étienne Dumonstier, French Renaissance portrait painter (born 1540)
  - Pieter Pietersz the Elder, Dutch painter (born 1540)
  - Joos van Winghe, Flemish painter (born 1544)
