= 1640 in art =

Events from the year 1640 in art.

== Events ==
- Nicolas Poussin completes the first series of Seven Sacraments.
- Abraham van Linge begins painting the windows for the chapel of University College, Oxford.
- Opening of the iconography studio at the Kremlin Armoury.

== Paintings ==
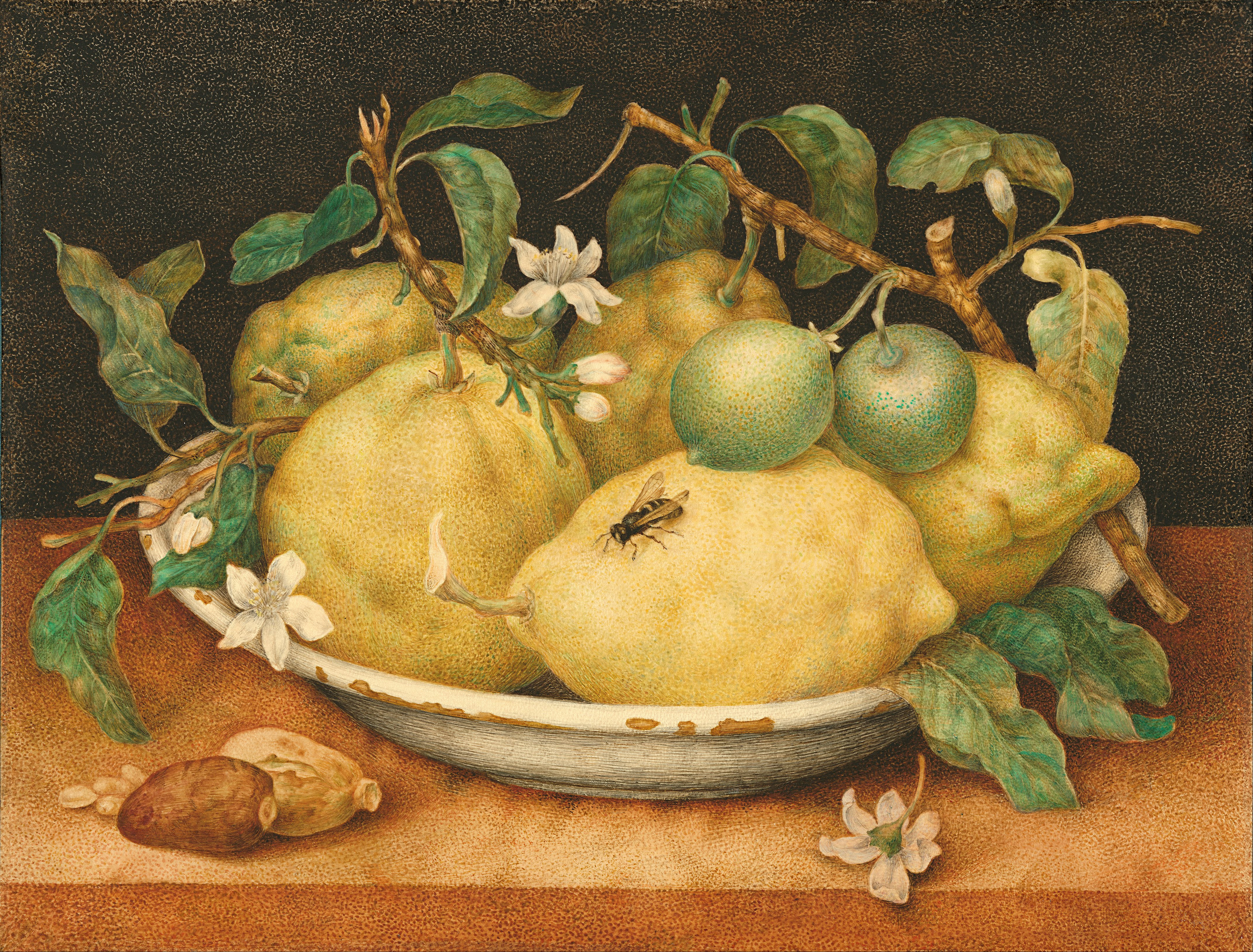
Garzoni – Still Life with Bowl of Citrons

- Govert Flinck - A Young Archer (c.1639-40)
- Giovanna Garzoni - Still Life with Bowl of Citrons
- Jacob Jordaens (approximate dates)
  - The King Drinks
  - Prometheus Bound
- Rembrandt
  - Harmen Doomer
  - Portrait of an Elderly Woman in a White Bonnet
  - Self-portrait
- Guido Reni - Saint Joseph and the Christ Child
- Diego Velázquez - Mars Resting (Prado Museum)

== Births ==
- June 21 - Abraham Mignon, Dutch flower painter born at Frankfurt (died 1679)
- August 2 - Gérard Audran, French engraver of the Audran family (died 1703)
- September 11 (or 1641) - Gerard de Lairesse, Dutch Golden Age painter and art theorist (died 1711)
- September 29 - Antoine Coysevox, French sculptor (died 1720)
- date unknown
  - Filippo Abbiati, Italian painter (died 1715)
  - Jean François Baudesson, French painter of flowers and fruit (died 1713)
  - Giovanni Lorenzo Bertolotti, Italian painter, active in Genoa (died 1721)
  - Jacques d'Agar, French portrait painter (died 1716)
  - Henry Gyles, English glass painter (died 1709)
  - Buhurizade Mustafa Itri, Ottoman-Turkish musician, composer, calligrapher, singer and poet (died 1712)
  - Isaac Paling, Dutch Golden Age painter (died 1728)
  - Jose Risueño, Spanish painter who helped decorate the cupola of the church in the Carthusian monastery (died 1721)
- probable
  - Giovanni Ventura Borghesi, Italian painter, active mainly in Rome (died 1708)
  - Marco Liberi, Italian painter of mythologic and historic cabinet paintings (died 1687)

== Deaths ==
- January - Johann Wilhelm Baur, German engraver, etcher and miniature painter (born 1607)
- January 8 - Alfonso Rivarola, Italian painter, active mainly in his native Ferrara (born 1607)
- February 4 (bur.) - Hendrick Cornelisz Vroom, Dutch painter (born 1566), father of Cornelis Hendriksz Vroom
- May 30 - Peter Paul Rubens, Flemish painter (born 1577)
- June - Abraham van der Doort, Dutch-born artist and curator (born c. 1575/1580?) (suicide)
- July 3 - Giuseppe Cesari, Italian painter (born 1568)
- August 3 - Giovanni Antonio Lelli, Italian painter of the Baroque period (born 1591)
- September 30 - Jacopo da Empoli, Italian late-mannerist painter (born 1551)
- October 26 - Pietro Tacca, Italian sculptor and follower of Giambologna (born 1557)
- November 22 - Mario Minniti, Italian painter, who was also the model for Caravaggio's painting Boy with a Basket of Fruit (born 1577)
- November 25 - Pellegrino Piola, Italian painter (born 1617)
- December 22 - Jean de Beaugrand, French lineographer and mathematician (born 1584)
- date unknown
  - Vicente Guirri, Spanish painter (date of birth unknown)
  - Giovanni Battista Ruggieri, Italian painter (date of birth unknown)
- probable
  - Antonia Bertucci-Pinelli, Italian woman painter (date of birth unknown)
  - Ercole de Maria, Italian painter awarded knighthood by Urban VIII (b. unknown)
