= Brizi =

Brizi is an Italian surname. Notable people with the surname include:

- Claudio Brizi (born 1960), Italian organist and harpsichordist
- Giuseppe Brizi (1942–2022), Italian footballer and manager

== See also ==
- Brizio
- Brizzi
