= 1673 in art =

Events from the year 1673 in art.

== Events ==
- Engraver Michael Vandergucht joins the Guild of St Luke at Antwerp.

== Paintings ==
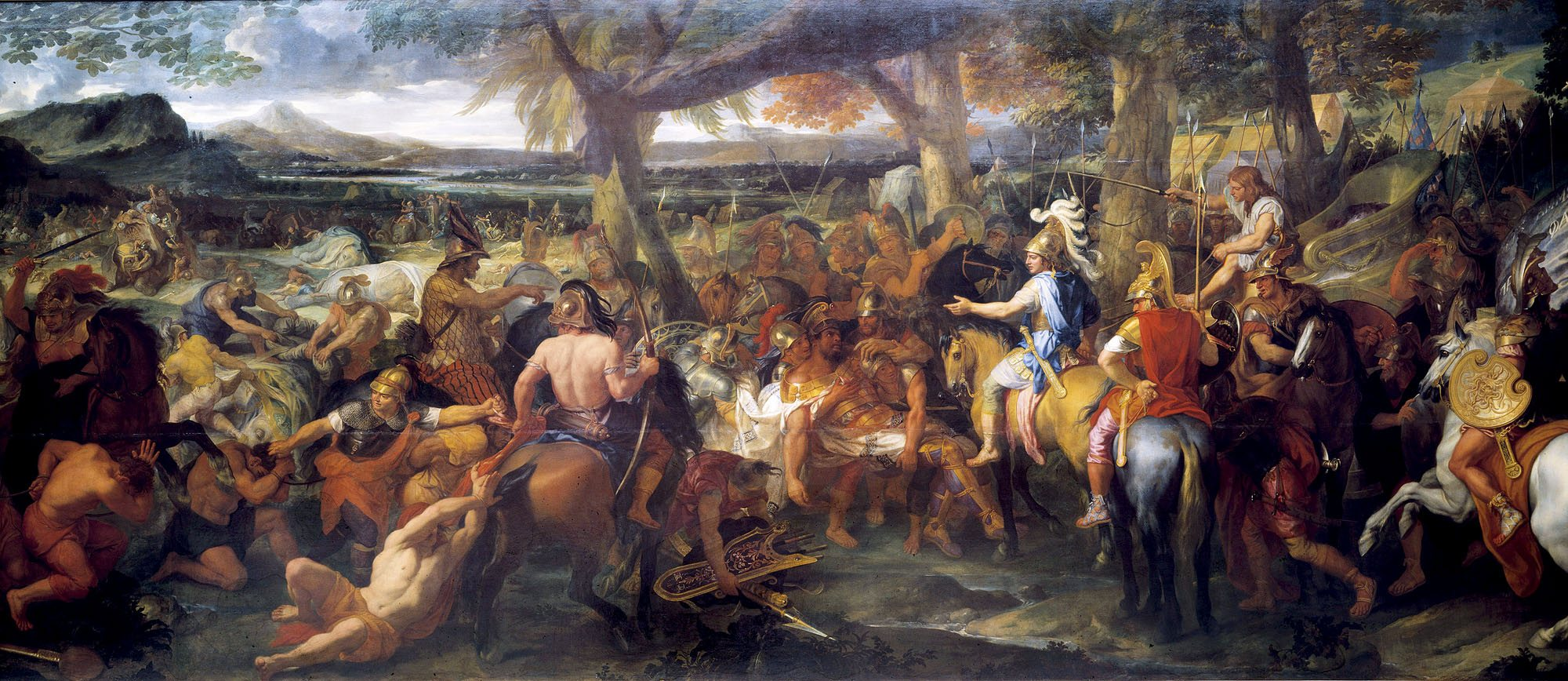
Alexander and Porus by Charles Le Brun

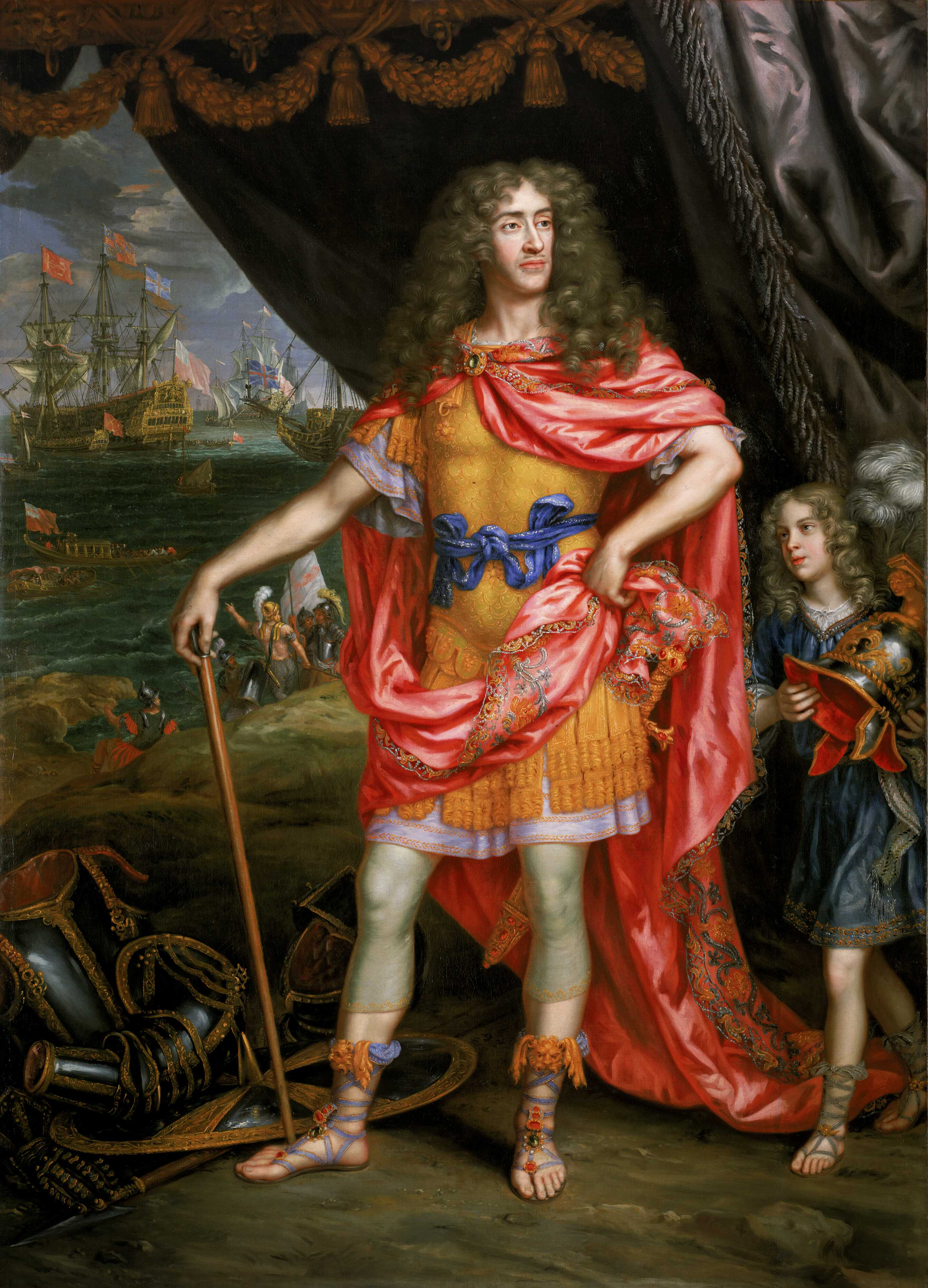
Portrait of James, Duke of York by Henri Gascar

- Ludolf Bakhuizen – The Y at Amsterdam, seen from the mussel pier
- Henri Gascar – Portrait of James, Duke of York
- John Greenhill – Portrait of Seth Ward (bishop of Salisbury)
- Charles Le Brun – Alexander and Porus

== Births ==
- January 28 - Georg Gsell, Swiss painter (died 1740)
- April - Maria Moninckx, Dutch botanical artist and painter (died 1757)
- April 28 - Claude Gillot, French painter, engraver, book illustrator, metal worker, and theatrical designer (died 1722)
- June 11 – Bernard Picart, French engraver (died 1733)
- date unknown
  - Thomas Germain, silversmith (died 1748)
  - Ádám Mányoki, Hungarian painter (died 1757)
  - Giovanni Battista Lama, Italian painter, active mainly in Naples (died 1748)
  - Giuseppe Melani, Italian painter, active mainly in Pisa (died 1747)
  - Pietro Paltronieri, Italian painter of quadratura (died 1741)
- probable – Andrea dell'Asta, Italian painter (died 1721)

== Deaths ==
- March - Isaack Luttichuys, Dutch Golden Age portrait painter (born 1616)
- March 15 – Salvator Rosa, Italian Baroque painter, poet and printmaker (born 1615)
- September 6 – Jan Thomas van Ieperen, Flemish painter and engraver (born 1617)
- October – Barent Fabritius, Dutch painter (born 1624)
- November 27 – Anthonie Palamedesz., Dutch painter (born 1602)
- date unknown
  - Carlo Cornara, Italian painter born in Milan (born 1605)
  - Anthonie de Lorme, Dutch painter (born 1610)
  - Francesco Grue, Italian potter and painter (born 1618)
  - Ingen, Chinese Linji Chán Buddhist monk, poet, and calligrapher (born 1592)
  - Jochim Neiman, German-born traveling painter who primarily worked in Finland (born 1600)
  - Mario Nuzzi, Italian painter specializing in still life painting of flower arrangements (born 1603)
  - Giovanni Quagliata, Italian painter of frescos and large canvases depicting historical and religious subjects (born 1603)
  - Xiao Yuncong, Chinese landscape painter, calligrapher, and poet in the late Ming Dynasty (born 1596)
