= Christ on the Mount of Olives =

Christ on the Mount of Olives may refer to:

- Christ on the Mount of Olives (Caravaggio), a painting by Caravaggio
- Christ on the Mount of Olives (Paul Gauguin), a painting by Paul Gauguin
- Christ on the Mount of Olives (Beethoven), an oratorio by Beethoven

== See also ==
- Mount of Olives, a mountain ridge east of Jerusalem
- Sermon on the Mount, a sermon given by Jesus Christ while on the Mount of Beatitudes, probably somewhere in Galilee
