= Bernardo Germán de Llórente =

Spanish painter

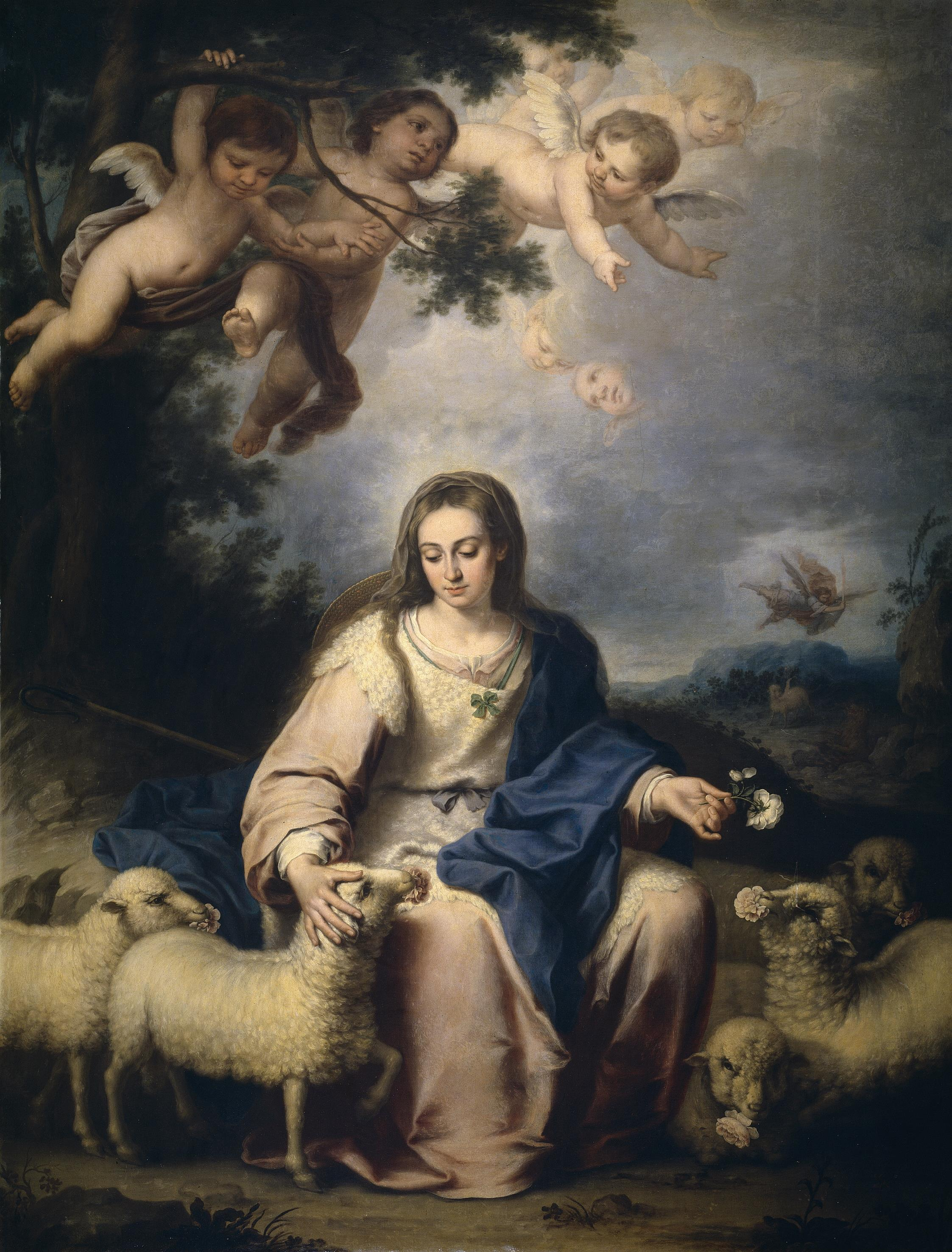
The divine shepherdess

Bernardo Germán de Llórente (1685 – 1759) was a Spanish painter of the late-Baroque period. He was active in Seville where he was one of the followers of Murillo and made a name with his devotional paintings of the Virgin Mary. He also painted portraits and still lifes with trompe-l'œil effects.

== Life ==
Bernardo Germán de Llórente was born and died in Seville. He likely first studied with his father and was then a pupil of Cristóbal López, a modest 'market painter' who was considered a follower of Murillo. He learned from his master to adequately imitate the palette of Murillo.

Father Isidoro de Sevilla, a capuchin missionary, commissioned from him a Virgin in shepherd dress. This painting brought him fame and many similar requests. He so frequently painted the Virgin Mary as a shepherdess that he was called the “painter of shepherdesses ('el pintor de las pastoras'). In these works he showed himself such a faithful follower of Murillo that his Divine shepherdess in the Prado Museum was for years believed to have been painted by Murillo.

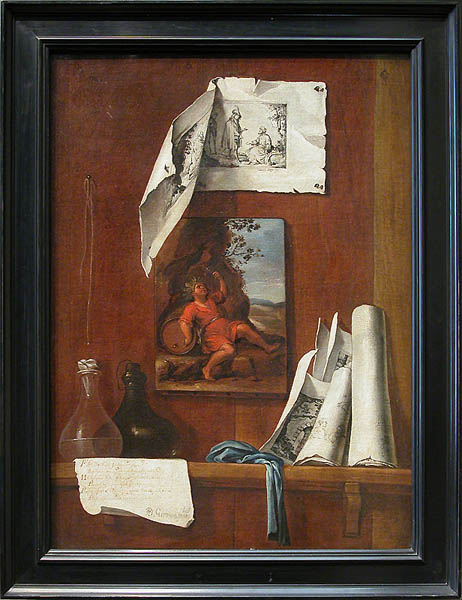
Wine or Allegory of taste

When the Spanish court was residing in Sevilla c. 1730, he was asked by Queen Isabel Farnese to paint a portrait of her son Don Philip. The Portrait of Don Philip at about age 10 shows him dressed in the fashion of the time, in a red coat with rich silver embroidery, the stars of the Holy Spirit and an azure blue sash. The work shows the influence of the Bourbon court painter Jean Ranc, whom Llórente had the opportunity to meet during his stay in Seville.

The Queen was so happy with the portrait that she gave him several gifts, including François Boucher's set of prints of the Battle of Alexandria. Llórente was called to Madrid by Philip V, who desired to make him court painter. He declined the honor, preferring an independent life. In 1735, he was inducted into the Academia Real de Bellas Artes de San Fernando.

Llórente was known for his trompe-l'œil still lifes, a genre that was quite popular in Andalusia at the time. An example is the Wine or the Allegory of taste at the Louvre. This composition contains several symbols of wine and taste. The engraving on the wall is signed by Pedro de Campolargo, a Flemish painter and engraver who worked first in Antwerp and then in Seville from 1640. The Latin inscriptions outline the rules of a pious life.

== See also ==
- Lorenzo Quiros (a pupil and imitator of Murillo)
