= Brizzi =

Brizzi may refer to:

- Meneghino del Brizzi (c. 1600-after 1678), Italian painter from Bologna
- Alberto Brizzi (born 1984), Italian professional tennis player.
- Aldo Brizzi (born 1960), Italian composer and director.
- Anchise Brizzi (1887–1964), Italian cinematographer.
- Enrico Brizzi (born in Bologna, November 20, 1974) is an Italian writer.
- Fausto Brizzi (Rome 15 November 1968) is an Italian screenwriter and film director.
- Filippo Brizzi (1603–1675) was an Italian painter of the Baroque period.
- Jeremy Brizzi (born in McHenry, IL, October 8, 1976) is an American writer and musician.
- Maria Brizzi Giorgi (1775–1812, Italian organist, composer and pianist.
- Mary T. Brizzi, pen name of Mary A. Turzillo (born 1940), American science fiction writer.
- Massimiliano Brizzi (born 1975), Italian football player.
- Paul and Gaëtan Brizzi (both born December 24, 1951) are twin artists and animators from France.
- Serafino Brizzi (1684–1724) was an Italian engraver of the Baroque period.
- Umberto Brizzi (January 20, 1908 – August 28, 1991) is an Italian weightlifter.
