= Luis Tristán =

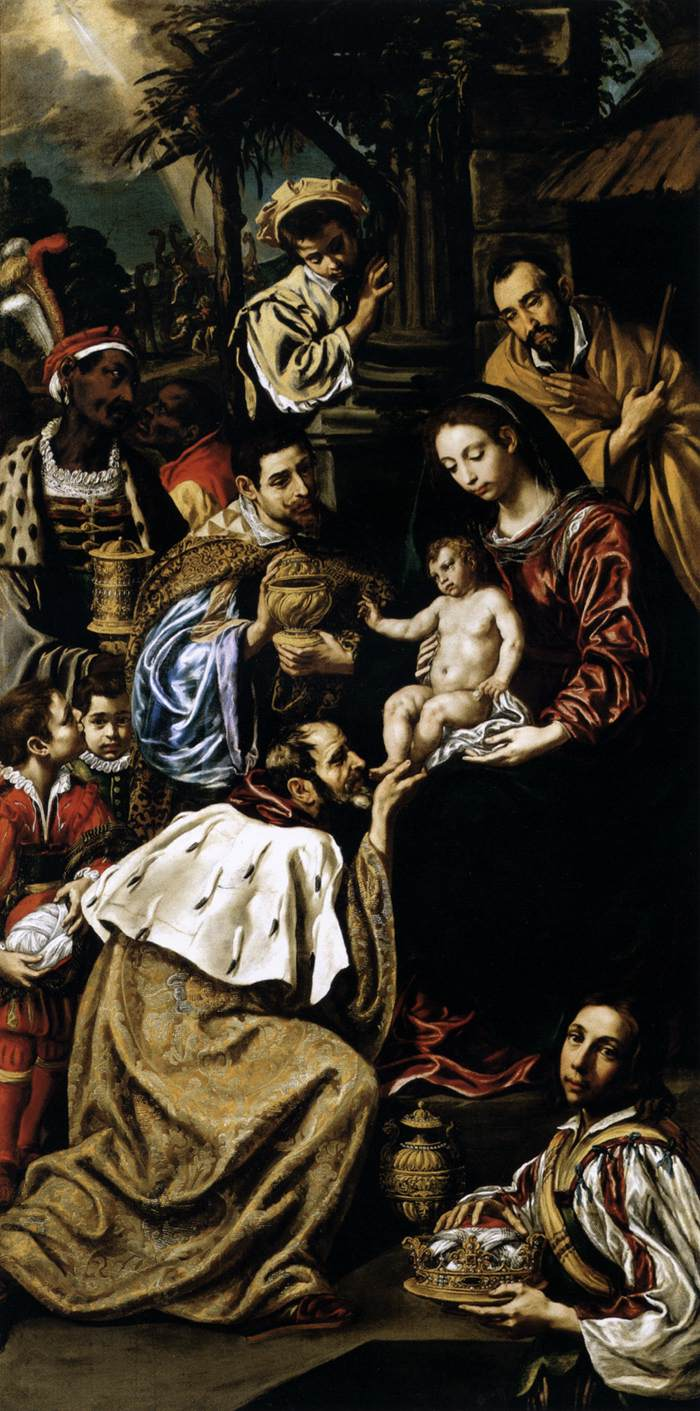
The Adoration of the Magi, Museum of Fine Arts (Budapest)

Luis Tristán de Escamilla, also known as Luis de Escamilla or Luis Rodríguez Tristán (c.1585, Toledo - 1624, Toledo), was a Spanish painter in the mannerist style.

== Life and work ==
He was born into a family of merchants and artisans. In 1603, he entered the workshop of El Greco, and remained there until 1606. He initially imitated his teacher's style to the extent that many of his works have been attributed to him and vice versa. After El Greco's son, Jorge Manuel Theotocópuli, Tristán is considered to be his principle follower. He then spent seven years in Italy, returning home around 1613.

He would work exclusively in Toledo for the rest of his life. His post-Italian work showed the influence of the Caravaggisti and the general aesthetic approach of the Counter-Reformation. Apart from a few realistic portraits, his work is religious in focus. Although his figures show the distortions typical of his master, he introduced elements from daily life, rendered in a naturalistic style that offsets their lack of realism.

His most important works may be a set of paintings made for the main altarpiece at the church of Saint Benedict of Nursia in Yepes, from approximately 1616, which includes six scenes from the life of Jesus and eight half-figures of various saints. During the Spanish Civil War, the altar was largely destroyed, but the torn canvases were repaired at the Museo del Prado and all but two were returned to the church in 1942.

Other works include "Saint Louis Distributing Alms", currently in the Louvre, and "The Round of Bread and Eggs" at the Museum of Santa Cruz.

One of his best-known students was the still-life painter, Pedro de Camprobín.

== Sources ==
- Antonio Palomino, An account of the lives and works of the most eminent Spanish painters, sculptors and architects, 1724, first English translation, 1739, p. 35.
- Alfonso Pérez Sánchez and Benito Navarrete Prieto, Luis Tristán 1585-1624, Ediciones del Umbral, 2001.
- Dafne E. Padilla Gaffal, El naturalismo de Luis Tristán. Estudio histórico-artístico de la Última cena Toledo: Dókos-Monografías, 2025. ISBN 978-84-09-75900-2.
