= Cristóbal López (18th century) =

Spanish painter

Cristobal López (d. 1730) was a Spanish painter. He was the son of Josef López of Seville, and Cristobal painted largely for the South American market, and painted in fresco in the church of All Saints, a giant St. Christopher and a Last Supper.
