= Franz Friedrich Franck =

German painter

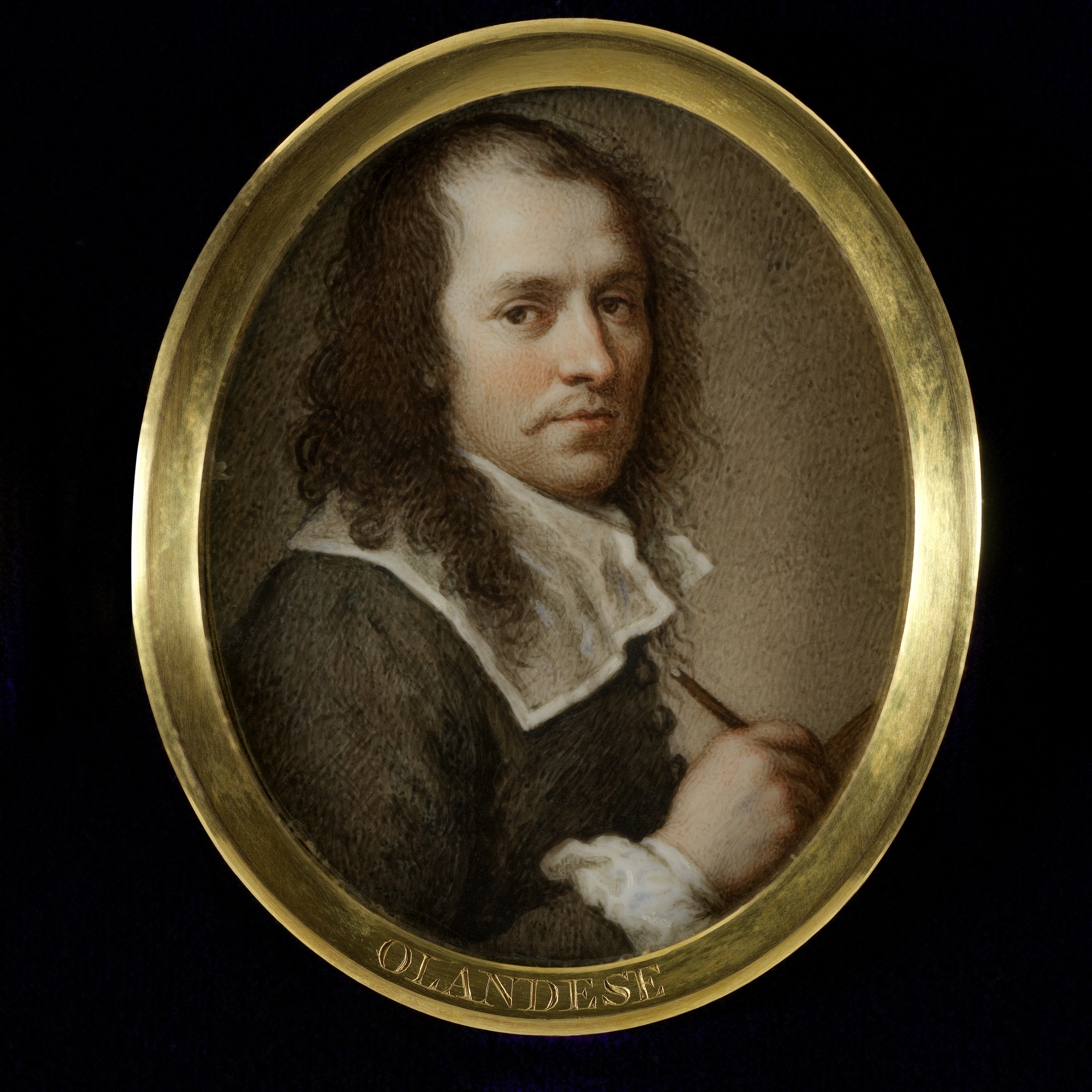
Franz-Friedrich-Franck

Franz Friedrich Franck, born at Augsburg in 1627, was instructed by his father, Hans Ulrich Franck. He died at Augsburg in 1687. The following productions are by him:

- Augsburg. St. Anna. The History of Jacob and Esau.
- Carlsruhe. Ducal Pal. The Passage of the Red Sea.
- Mannheim. Gallery. The Israelites after the Passage through the Red Sea, and A Saloon of Pictures and Antiquities.
- Ratisbon. Cathedral. St. Francis dying.
- Vienna. Gallery. Portrait of a Man.
