= Antonio Capulongo =

Italian painter

Antonio Capulongo (c. 1580) was an Italian painter of the late-Renaissance period.

He was born and active in Naples. He was the pupil of Giovanni Bernardo della Loma. He painted the principal altar-piece for the church of San Diego, Naples, representing an Immaculate Conception, with SS. Francis of Assisi and Anthony of Padua. He also painted a Madonna and Child with Angels and Saints for the church of San Niccolo.
