= Lorenzo Quiros =

Spanish painter

Lorenzo Quiros (1717–1789) was a Spanish historical painter, and imitator of Murillo. He was born at Santos in Extremadura. He studied at Seville under Bernardo German Llórente, then he went to Madrid, but his turbulent disposition induced him to abandon the patronage of Corrado Giaquinto and Anton Rafael Mengs, who were disposed to employ him. He returned to Seville, where he remained for twenty years without ever acquainting anyone with his place of residence. He sold copies of the works of Murillo. He left works at Madrid, at the Royal Academy of San Fernando, at Canalla, Granada, Xeres and Seville.
