= Brizio =

Brizio is a surname. Notable people with the surname include:

- Anna Maria Brizio (1902–1982), Italian professor of art history
- Arturo Brizio Carter (born 1956), Mexican football referee
- Edoardo Brizio (1846–1907), Italian archaeologist
- Emanuela Brizio (born 1969), Italian mountain runner
- Francesco Brizio (1574–1623), Italian painter and engraver

== See also ==
- Brizio Giustiniani (1713–1778), 174th Doge of the Republic of Genoa
