= Francesco Ange =

Italian painter

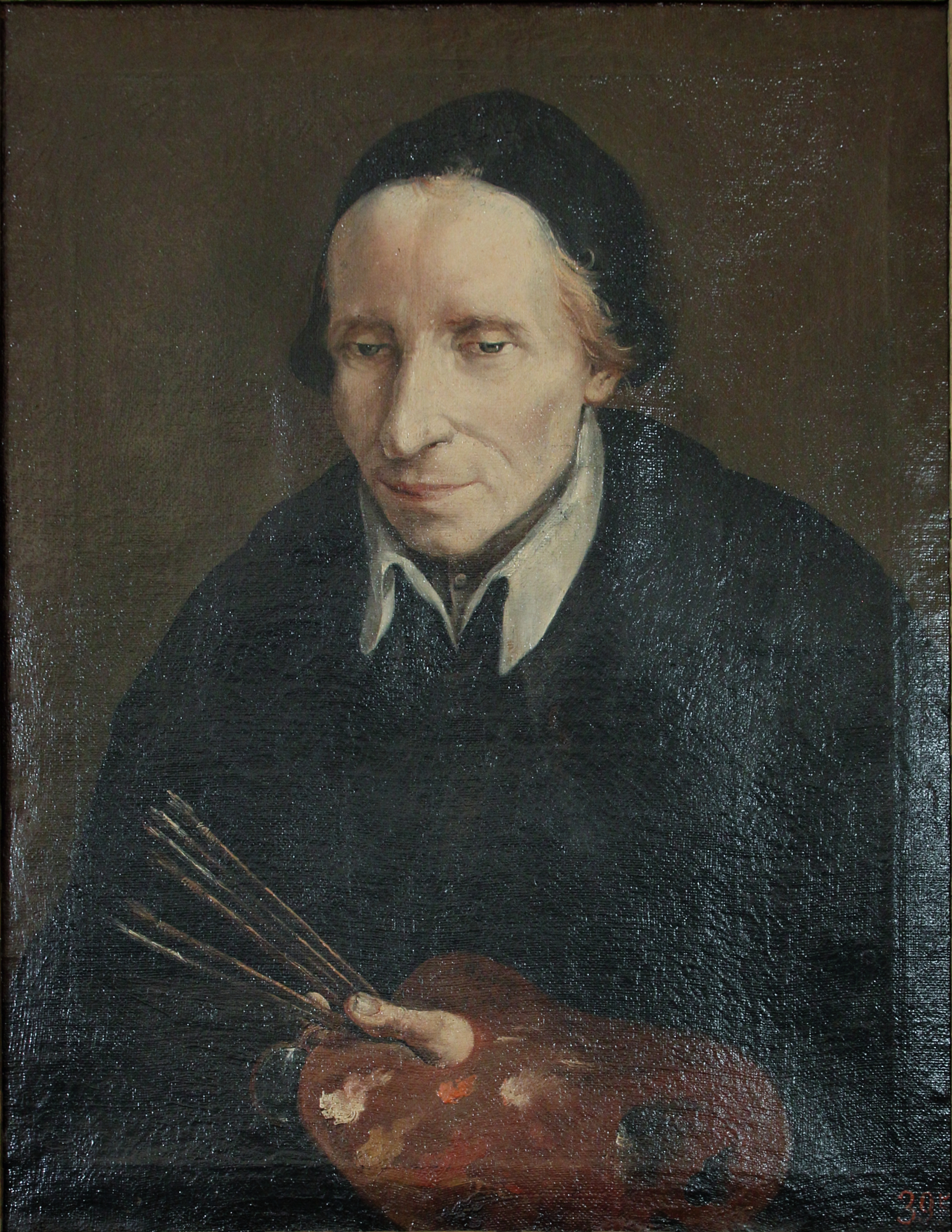
Self-portrait

Francesco Ange (1675–1757) was an Italian painter of the late-Baroque period. Born in Annesi, Savoyard state and trained in Bologna, Papal States. He joined the Philippine order established by Saint Phillip Neri.
