= Ercole de Maria =

Italian painter

Ercole de Maria (died c. 1640) was an Italian painter of the Baroque period, active mainly in Bologna. He was a pupil of the painter Guido Reni. He was also known as Ercolino di Guido. He was awarded a knighthood by Pope Urban VIII, but died young.
