= Cheng Sui =

Chinese artist (1605–1691)

Cheng Sui (Chinese: 程邃; pinyin: Chéng Suì; 1605–1691) was a Qing dynasty Chinese landscape painter, poet, seal cutter, and calligrapher.

Cheng was born in She County, Anhui. His courtesy name was 'Muqian' and his sobriquet was 'Gou daoren'. Cheng's landscapes were painted using dry and dark brushstrokes. He died in 1691.
