= Maria Brizzi Giorgi =

Italian organist, composer and pianist

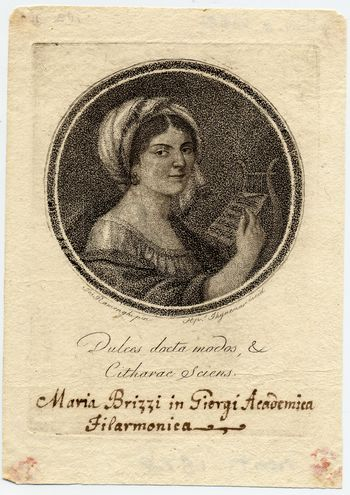
Maria Brizzi Giorgi (1775-1812)

Maria Brizzi Giorgi (7 August 1775 – 7 January 1812 in Bologna) was an Italian organist, composer and pianist noted for her improvisational ability. A military march composed by Brizzi was performed for Napoleon when he passed through Bologna in 1807. Haydn, Muzio Clementi and Leopold Kozeluch dedicated works to her. She taught music and was member of the Accademia Filarmonica di Bologna.

== Biography ==
Maria Brizzi Giorgi was born on the 7 August 1775 in Bologna, into a musical family and began to perform in public at an early age. She served as organist and choral director from 1787–89 with the Sisters of St. Bartholomew in Ancona and then returned to Bologna, where she continued her studies in music, and developed her skills in particular in counterpoint.

Brizzi married Luigi Giorgi in 1793 and opened a salon, continuing to perform as a pianist in Europe. She was admired as a performer, and Haydn, Muzio Clementi and Leopold Kozeluch dedicated works to her. A military march composed by Brizzi was performed for Napoleon, when he passed through Bologna in 1807. She taught music and was member of the Accademia Filarmonica di Bologna.

Brizzi died in Bologna after childbirth at the age of 36. Giordani wrote a funeral elegy for her, Elogio funebre, and recounts that shortly before her death she got up to improvise at the piano, asking her sister, who was also a pianist, to record her last composition. Most of her compositions have been lost, although some are archived at the Liceo Musicale of Bologna.
