= Carlo Bozzoni =

Italian painter

Carlo Bozzoni (c. 1605–1657) was an Italian painter of the Baroque period. He trained with his father, the painter and engraver, Luciano Bozzoni.
