= Francesco Brizio =

Italian painter and engraver (1574–1623)

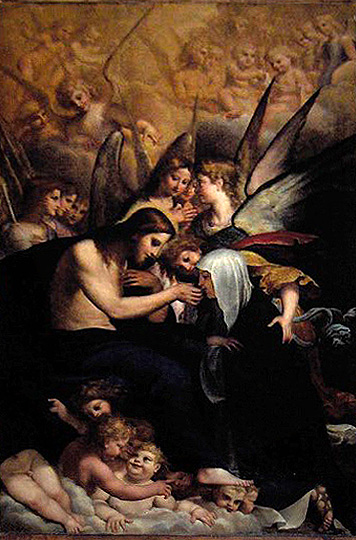
Francesco Brizio, St Catherine's mystic communion, Basilica of San Domenico, Bologna

Francesco Brizio (1574 – 1623) was an Italian painter and engraver of the Bolognese School, active in the early-Baroque.

== Biography ==
It appears Cesare Malvasia confused him with il Nosadella or Giovanni Francesco Bezzi, who lived and was active only in the 16th century. Brizio was born in Bologna. He was initially a pupil of Bartolommeo Passarotti, but then became a pupil under Agostino and Ludovico Carracci. He helped paint, along with Lucio Massari and Leonello Spada, stories of Torquato Tasso's epic in the loggias of the Palazzo Bentivoglio. He also frescoed a ceiling for the signori Conti Boschetti in Modena and in the Oratorio della SS Trinità in Pieve di Cento. In Bologna, he painted a Coronation of the Madonna del Borgo for the church of San Petronio. He also frescoed in the cloister of San Michele in Bosco. His son Filippo became a pupil of Guido Reni. Another pupil was Domenico Ambrogi.

In engraving he was instructed by Agostino Carracci, and he is said to have forwarded some of the plates of that master. He died at Bologna in 1623.

== Works ==
Among his works as an engraver:

- A large Landscape from his own design.
- St. Roch after Parmigianino.
- The flight to Egypt after Ludovico Carracci.
- The Holy Family after Correggio.
- Portrait of Cinthio Aldobrandini; after Ludovico Carracci.
- A Frontispiece; inscribed Explicatione del sacro lenzuolo; (1599) after the same.
- Another Frontispiece; inscribed Tempio al Cardinale Cinthio Aldobrandini (1579) after the same,
- Another Frontispiece, with the Arms of Duke of Modena, and in the middle some Children; the Virgin Mary in the Clouds; after the same.
- The Virgin Mary crowned, with the Infant Jesus, after same. (1594)
- St. Francis kneeling, holding the Infant Jesus, and the two Angels.
- The great St. Jerome; left incomplete by Agostino Carracci.
- Christ and the Samaritan (1610) and A Blind Man led by a Dog after Annibale Carracci.
