= Jacob Adam =

Austrian copper etcher

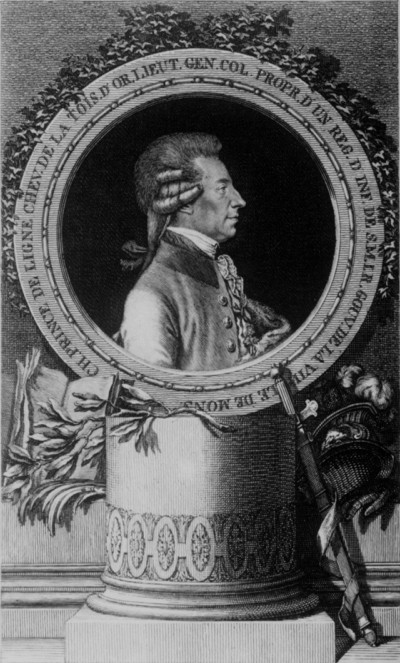
Charles-Joseph de Ligne by Jacob Adam, copper engraving, 1785

Jacob Adam (9 October 1748 – 16 September 1811) was an Austrian copper etcher.

Adam worked mainly for printing offices, but is best known for his small format portraits of which he created more than 100. He was born and died in Vienna.

Adam created miniature portrait etchings of famous people of his day, including Charles-Joseph, 7th Prince of Ligne and the Holy Roman Emperor Joseph II; the latter etching is kept in the collections of the Metropolitan Museum of Art in New York.

== Sources ==
- Allgemeine Deutsche Biographie - online version
- Allgemeines Künstler-lexikon: Unter Mitwirkung der namhaftesten Fachgelehrten des In- und Auslandes. 1872. Vol. 1, pp. 61–63
- Constantin von Wurzbach: Adam, Jakob. Bibliographical entry in Biographisches Lexikon des Kaiserthums Oesterreich. 1856. Part 1, p. 4 f.
