= Dionys van Dongen =

Dutch painter

Dionys van Dongen (3 September 1748 – 21 May 1819) was a Dutch painter.

Van Dongen was born in Dordrecht, and was initially taught by his father who was also an artist. He painted primarily marine art and genre art. In 1771 he settled in Rotterdam and painted flower still lifes and landscapes. He often painted copies of old masters. He died in Rotterdam.
