= Josef Lopez =

Spanish painter

Josef López (c. 1650-?) was a Spanish painter, active during the Baroque period. He was born in Seville, where he was a pupil of Murillo, who followed the style of that master, but confined himself chiefly to painting representations of the Virgin. A St. Philip by him is in the convent of La Merced Calzada at Seville. His son was also a painter.
