= Simón de León Leal =

Spanish painter (1610–1687)

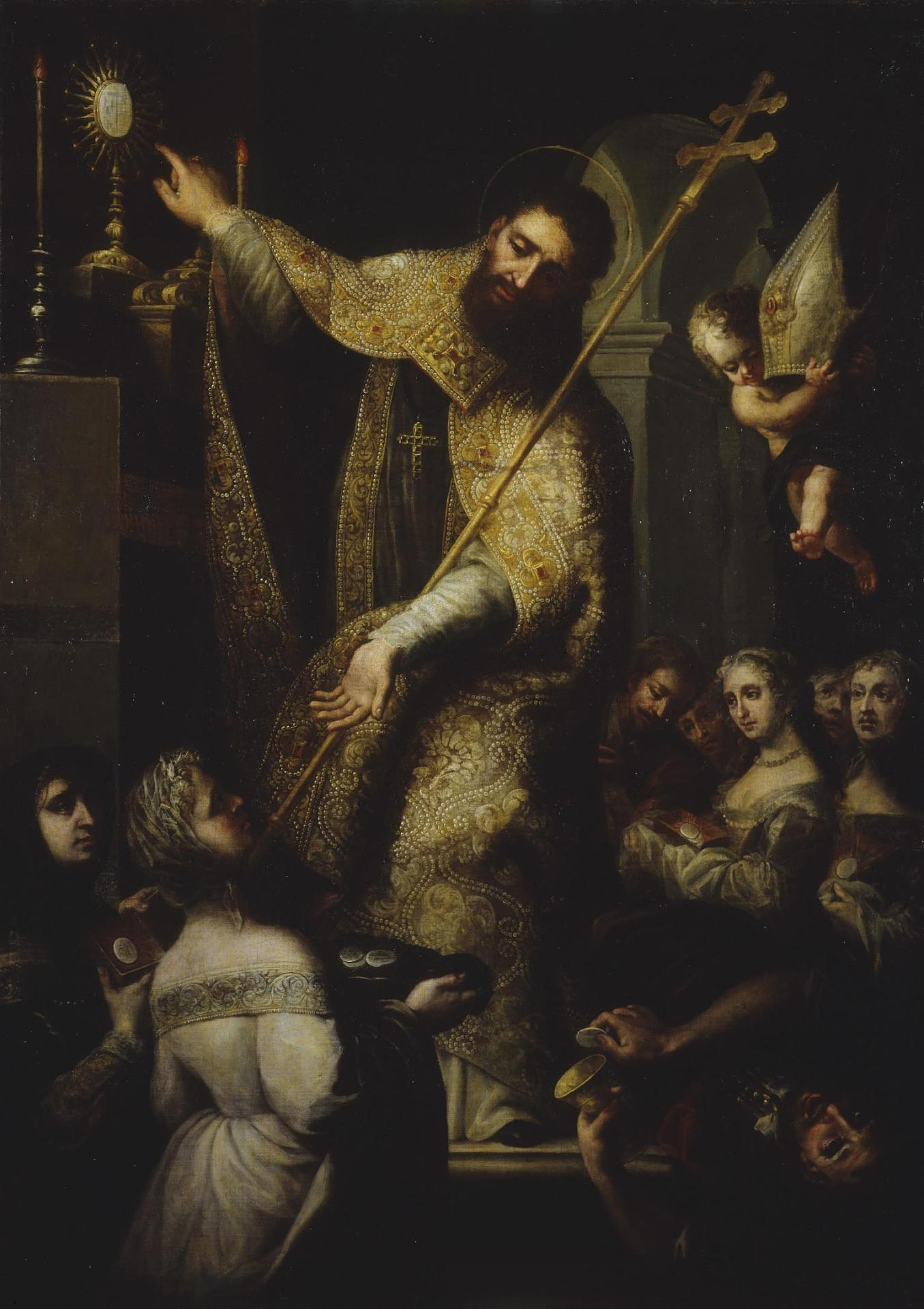
Triumph of Saint Norbert, The Hermitage Museum

Simón de León Leal (1610–1687) was a Spanish painter of the Baroque period. He was born in Madrid to Diego de León Leal (originally from the Principality of Catalonia) and Juana de Durán (according to Palomino). He was a pupil of Pedro de Las Cuevas. He was known for both portraits and history paintings.

For the Premonstratensian Friars he painted an altarpiece representing Saint Norbert triumphing over Heresy and a St. Norbert receiving vestments from the hands of the Virgin. For the church of the Noviciado Gesuita he painted an altarpiece of scenes from the Infancy of Christ, and for the church of the Capuchins, an Immaculate Conception. He was appointed painter to the queen. He died in Madrid.
