= Pedro de Camprobín =

Spanish Baroque painter

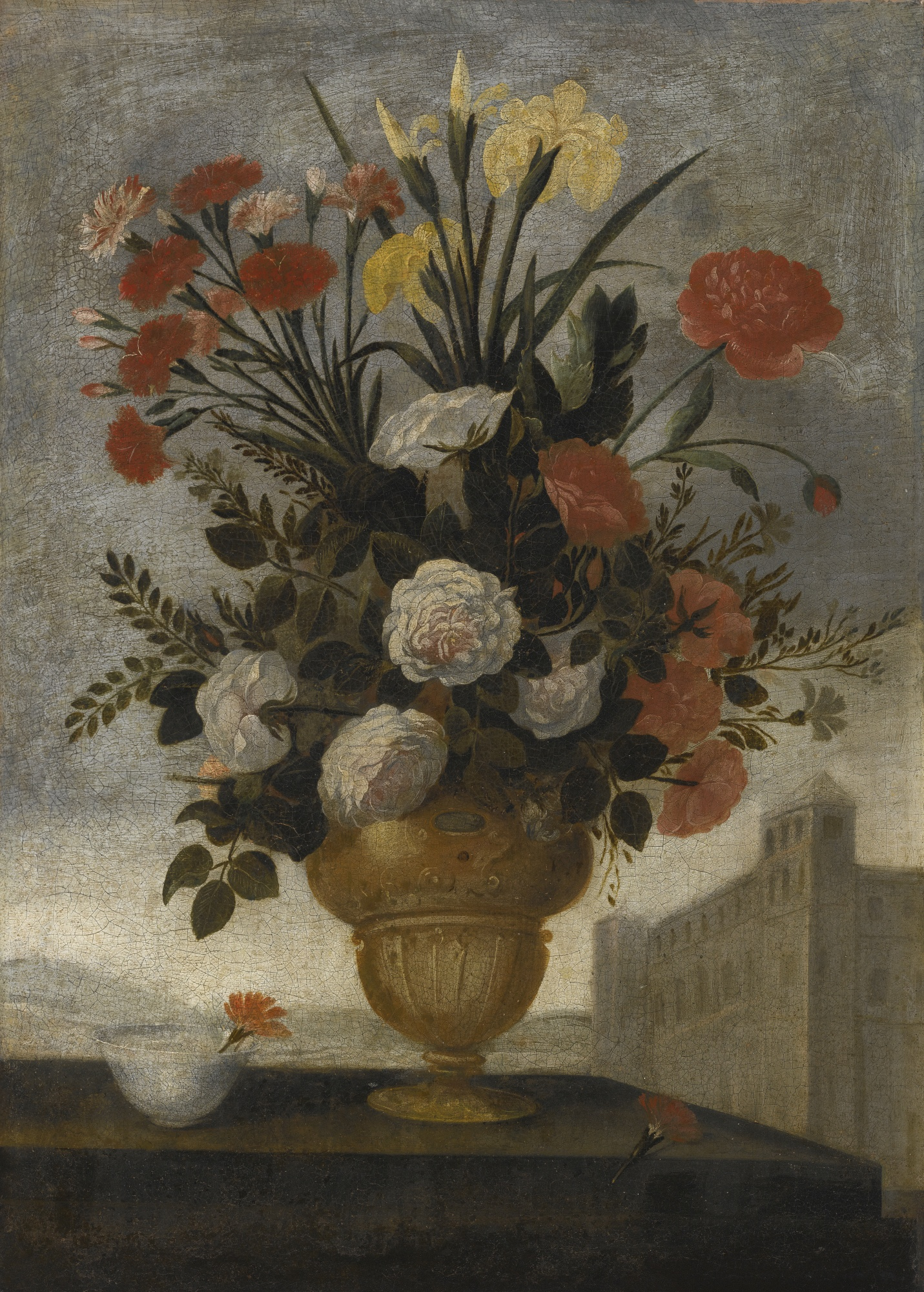
Still-life of Iris, Lilies, Roses and Carnations in an Elaborate Urn

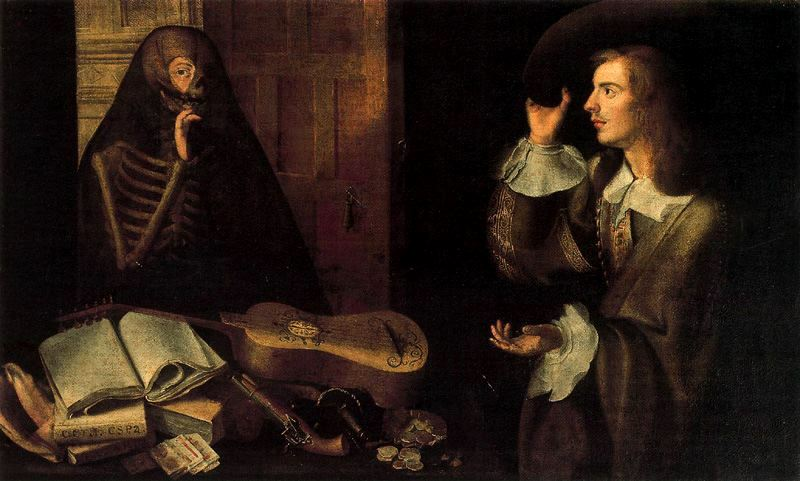
Death and the Knight

Pedro de Camprobín Passano (1605, Almagro - 22 July 1674, Seville) was a Spanish Baroque painter who specialized in still-lifes; primarily flowers.

== Life and work ==
His father, Pedro, was a silversmith and his mother, Juana (née Passano) was descended from the Peroli brothers; painters from Genoa who had worked on the frescoes at the Palacio del Marqués de Santa Cruz. At the age of fourteen, he was apprenticed to Luis Tristán in Toledo. He does not appear on the official record again until 1630, when he passed the exam for the painter's guild in Seville. It is presumed that he completed his training in Madrid with Juan van der Hamen, due to comparable stylistic elements in his early works.

From 1632 to 1634, he created the "Magdalena Repentant" at the Iglesia del Divino Salvador, which is the only religious work he is known to have produced. The figures show the influence of Francisco de Zurbarán, but his still-life sensibility is displayed in the items arranged on a table, in the style of a "vanitas".

He married and had two daughters, but was already a widower when he made out his will in 1670. Ten years earlier, he and other notable artists, such as Bartolomé Esteban Murillo, Juan de Valdés Leal and Francisco Herrera, had participated in the creation of the "Academia de dibujo de Sevilla" (drawing academy), in which he collaborated until his death.

Although he painted a wide variety of still lifes, his true specialty was floral arrangements; always presented in bowls or vases, with a casual look, and occasionally accompanied by living creatures, such as butterflies. Some have architectural perspectives; in the style of contemporary Italian models. He has been credited with the painting, "Death and the Knight", at the Hospital de la Caridad; an attribution based on the arrangement and symbolic value of numerous everyday objects.
