= Vicente Guirri =

Spanish painter

Vicente Guirri (died 1640) was a religious Augustinian Spanish painter of the Baroque period. He was born in Valencia, and became a friar in the Augustine convent of that city in 1608. He painted devotional themes.
