= Carlo Cornara =

Italian painter

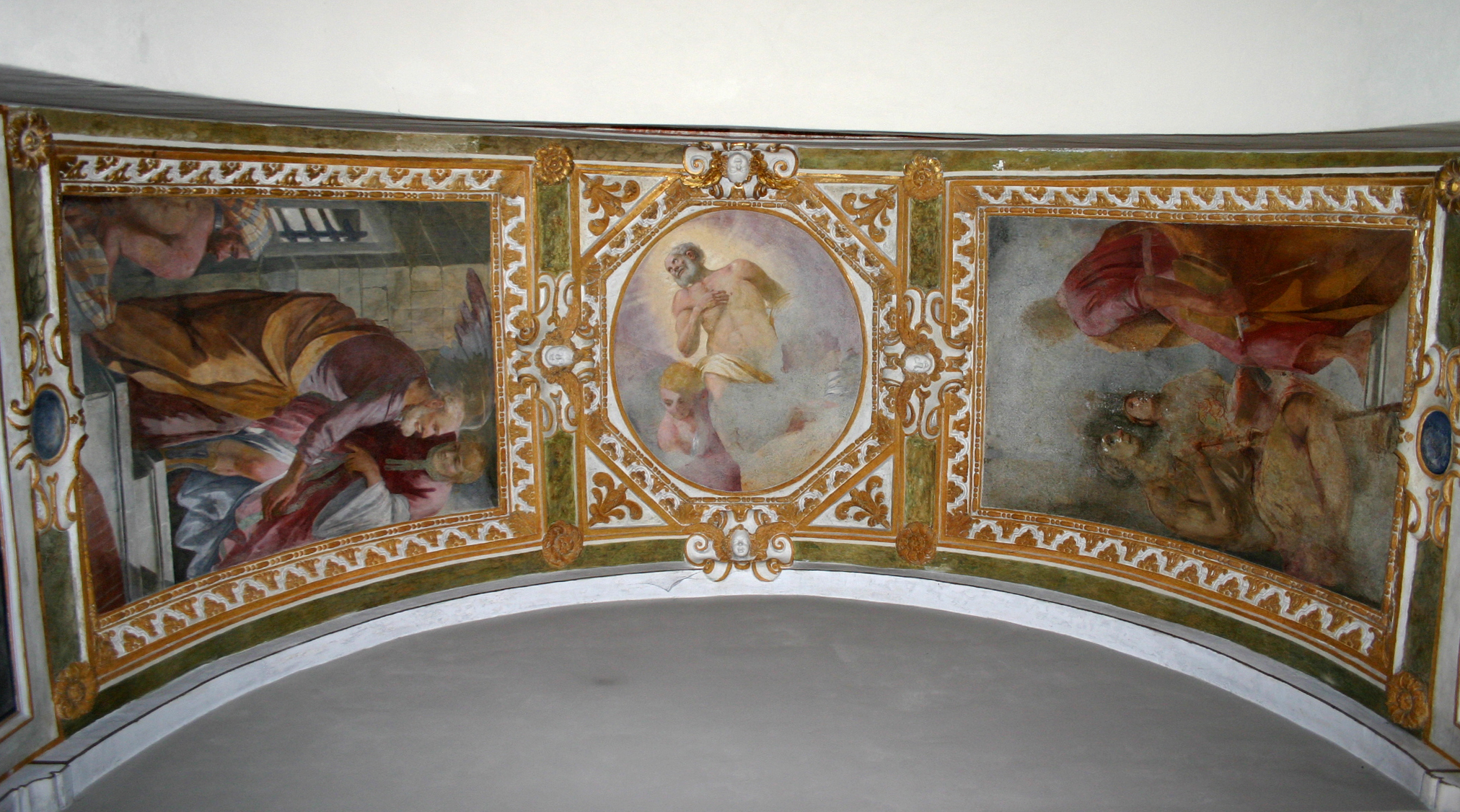
frescos by Carlo Cornara, left-side nave of Basilica of Sant'Ambrogio, Saint Peter's chapel

Carlo Cornara (ca. 1608 – 1676) was an Italian painter of the Baroque period. He was born in Milan, where he became a pupil of Camillo Procaccini. He did not produce many works. He painted a St. Benedict for the Certosa of Pavia.
