= Hans Ulrich Franck =

German historical painter and etcher

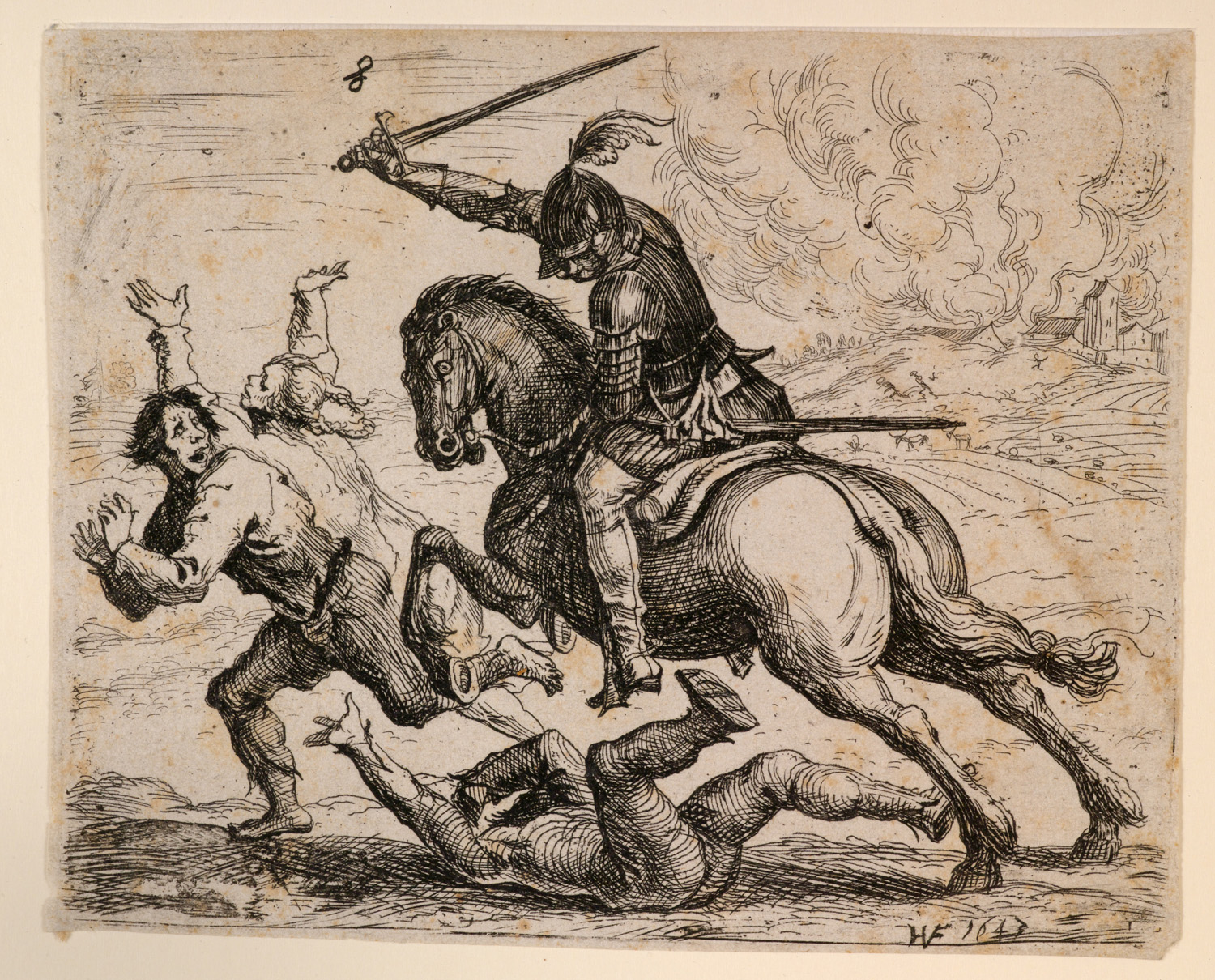
The armoured rider, 1643

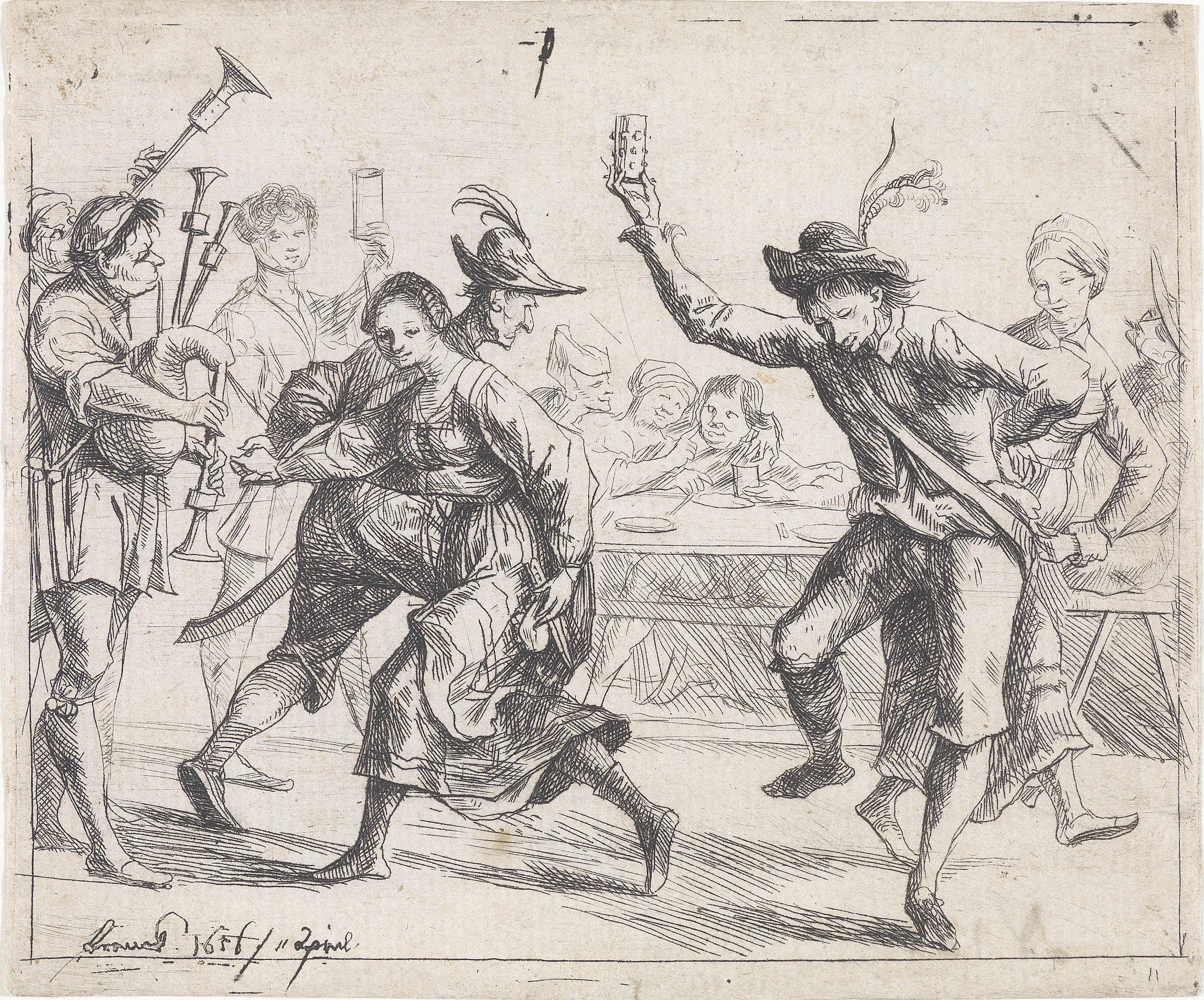
Dancing soldiers, 1656

Hans Ulrich Franck, a German historical painter and etcher, was born at Kaufbeuren, in Swabia, in 1603. He resided chiefly at Augsburg, where he died in 1675. His son Franz Friedrich Franck was an artist as well. Among other engravings the following are by him:

- Twenty-five plates of scenes in Military Life. 1656.
- The Meeting of David and Abigail.
- Alexander and the dying Darius. 1644.
