= Crestano Menarola =

Italian painter

Crestano Menarola (1605–1687) was an Italian print-maker and painter of the Baroque period. He trained in Vicenza under Alessandro Maganza, then moved to work in Bassano del Grappa. He followed the style of Paolo Veronese. Menarola painted for churches and palaces, but little of his painted work remains. He painted for the presbytery in Asiago and painted altarpieces for the Cathedral and the chapel of Spirito Santo in the church of San Francisco in Bassano. He painted a portrait of Federico da Molin for the Audience Hall in the Palazzo Pretorio of Bassano. His son, Marco, was also a painter. Pietro Menarola, an engraver, was also a member of his family. A Sacrifice of Iphigenia, attributed to Menarola is in display in the Pinacoteca of Palazzo Chiericati, Vicenza. Among his prints is a Descent of the Holy Spirit, after a design of Jacopo Bassano.
