= Giovanni Battista Lama =

Italian painter

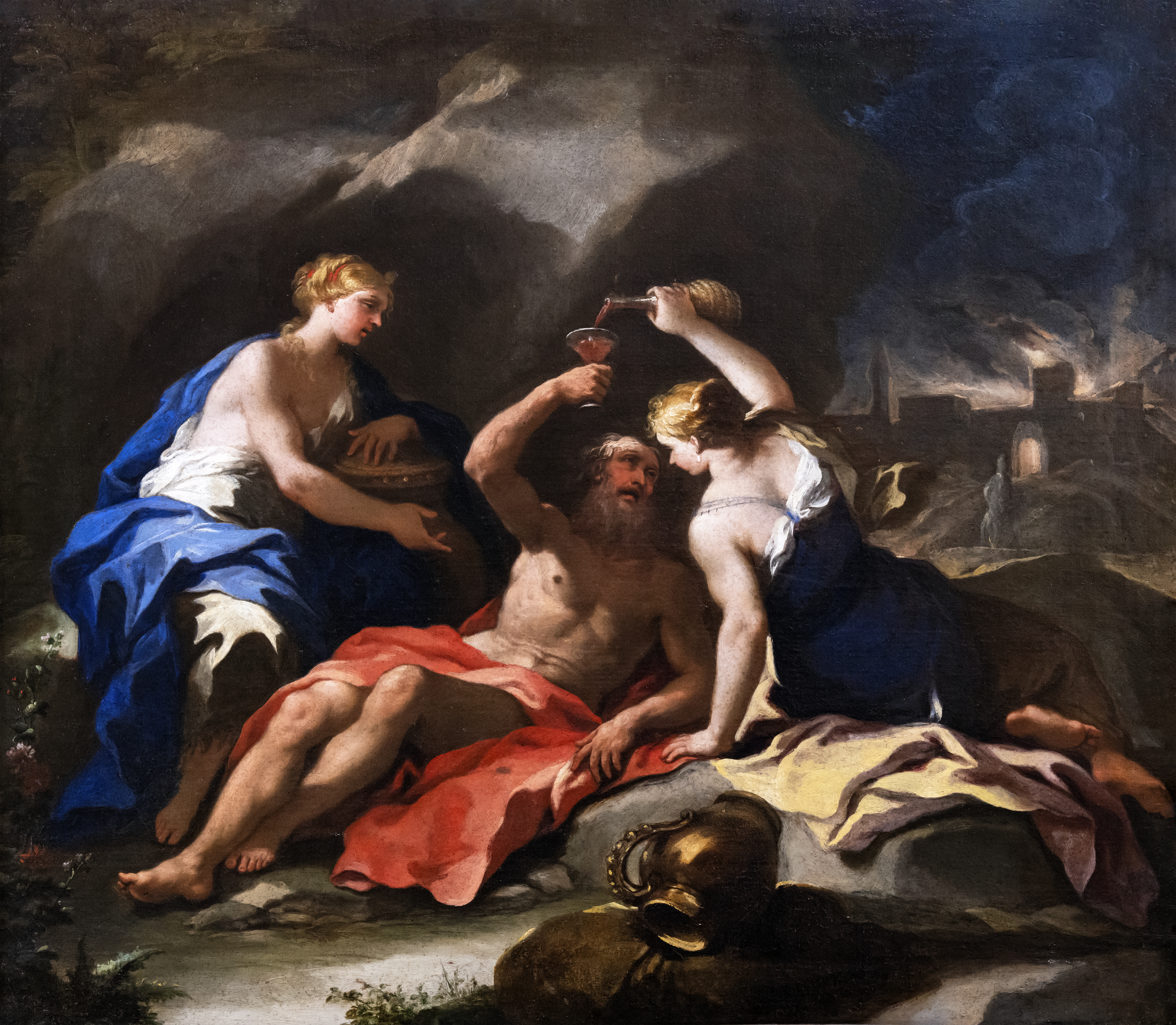
Lot and his daughters Musée des Beaux-Arts d'Agen

Giovanni Battista Lama (1673–1748) was an Italian painter of the Baroque period, active mainly in Naples. He primarily painted historical canvases. Along with Paolo de Matteis, he was pupil to the painter Luca Giordano. In turn, the painter Antonio Capulongo was his pupil.
