= Pedro de Campolargo =

Flemish painter and engraver

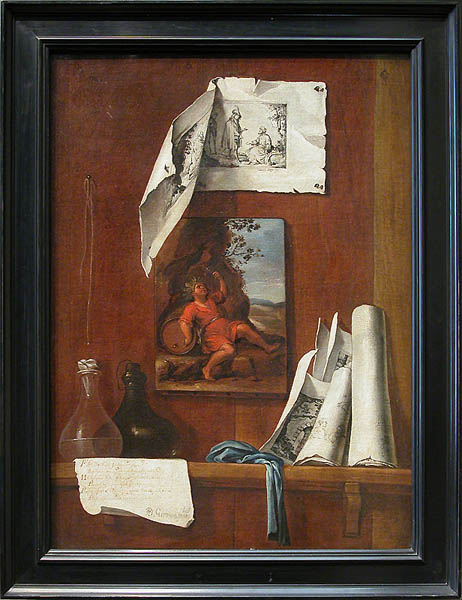
In this painting by Bernardo Germán de Llórente, an engraving signed by Pedro de Campolargo is reproduced on the wall

Pedro de Campolargo (c. 1605–1687) was a Flemish painter and engraver, who was active during the Baroque period and formed part of a large group of Flemish artists mostly from Antwerp who were active in Seville in the second half of the 17th century.

== Life ==
There is little information about Campolargo's early life and training. Even his Flemish name is not known with certainty. He is believed to have been a native of Antwerp who trained as a painter and engraver in his hometown. The first record on Campolargo in Seville is 17 November 1640 when he is recorded with his wife, Angela Adriaensens, at the baptism of their son in the parish of the Blessed Sacrament in Seville Cathedral. Years later, in October 1651, he was again recorded when taking an examination in the "art of painter of images on plates" with Sebastián de Llanos y Valdés. Campolargo, declared in an official document that he was "of the Flemish nation and age 46 or so."

In 1660 there is a record of Campolargo receiving an apprentice. In Seville, Campolargo formed part of a group of Flemish artists, principally from Antwerp, such as Cornelis Schut III, Jan (Juan) van Mol and Sebastián Faix. Some of them such as Schut and Campolargo were also involved in the establishment and promotion of the Academy of Fine Arts of Seville founded in 1660. Until 1663 Campolargo was one of the academy members who promoted the drawing style of Bartolomé Esteban Murillo. Campolargo is again documented in 1671 while working on the Triumph elevation in the cathedral on the occasion of the celebrations for the canonization of San Fernando, charging for the prints 1800 reales.

He dictated his will on 25 May 1675. He was buried on 23 January 1687. He left a son of the same name who in historical documents is also referred to as a painter.

Campolargo is documented as having worked in the so-called 'minor' genres such as landscape and portrait painting and worked also as a stage decorator.
