= Pietro Liberi =

Venetian painter (1605–1687)

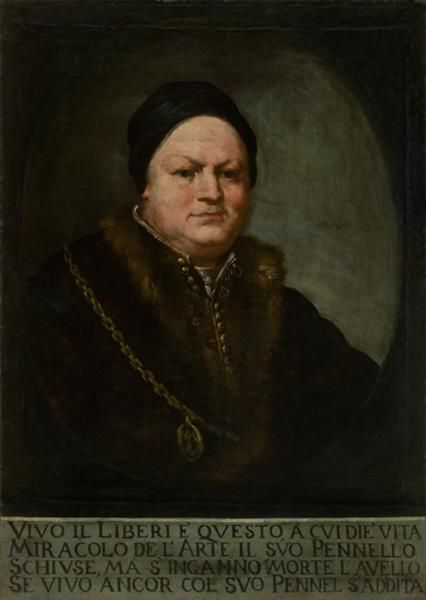
Portrait of Pietri Liberi by Marco Liberi (circa 1665-1675)

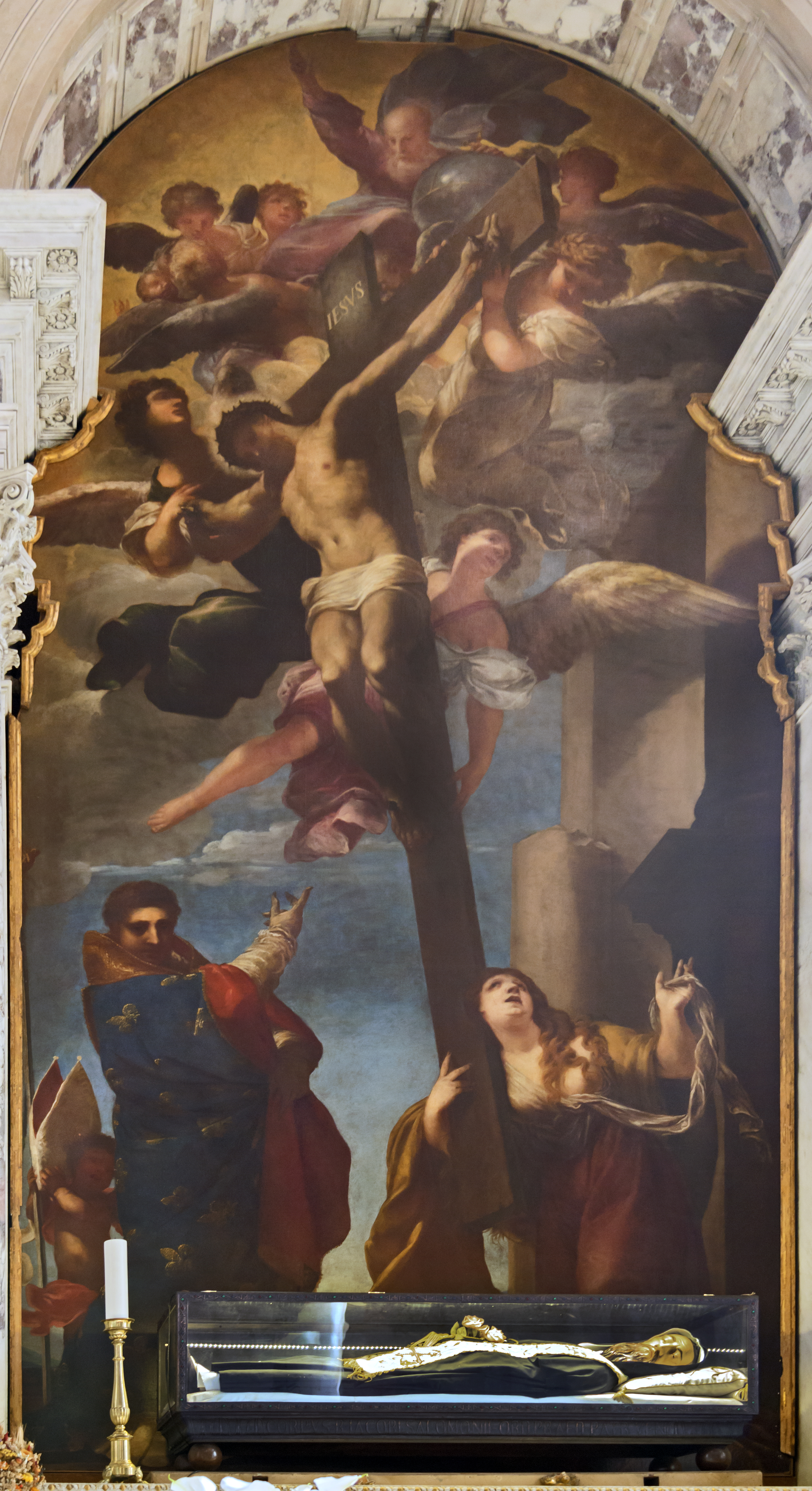
Crucifixion and Madeleine Santi Giovanni e Paolo, Venice

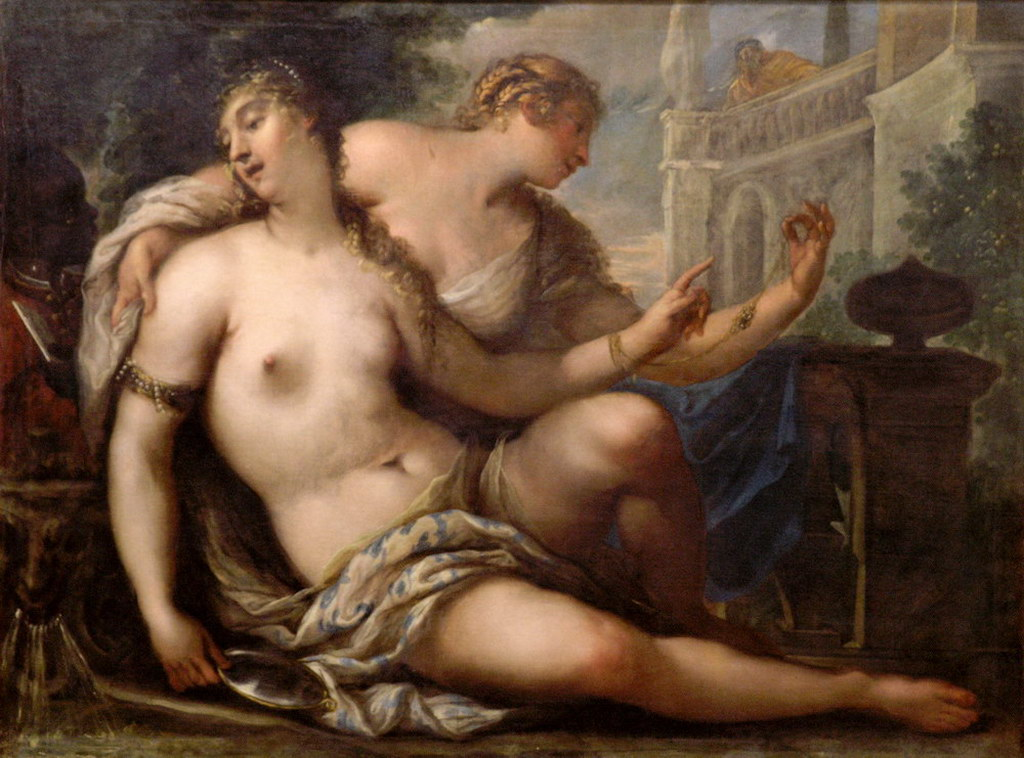
Betsabé by Pietro Liberi

Pietro (Libertino) Liberi (1605 – 18 October 1687) was a Venetian painter of the Baroque era, active mainly in Venice and the Veneto.

== Biography ==
Liberi was born in Padua, his earliest training was with Alessandro Varotari (il Padovanino).

He had an adventure-filled life. He traveled extensively in Italy. During a voyage to Istanbul, he was captured into bondage for 8 months by pirates from Tunis. Released through Malta, he visited Sicily, Naples, and Pisa. For a few years in his life, he became a mercenary with the forces of cavaliere Antonio Manfredini, who was fighting for the Duchy of Tuscany against the Saracens. He fought to capture the Castle of Sichia, in present İskenderun in Turkey. After the campaign, he returned to Livorno, and in 1637, traveled to Lisbon, visited Liguria, the Southern coast of France and Madrid. Back in Tuscany, he focused again on painting, travelling to Rome. There he was a roommate of the engraver Stefano della Bella. In Rome, he painted a Rape of the Sabines for Leopoldo de' Medici. He returned to Florence to paint a ceiling in the Oratory of San Filippo Neri. He traveled to Venice in 1643, painting Evangelists for the church of the Ospedaletto. He also painted a large altarpiece (1650) for the church of Santi Giovanni e Paolo in Venice. He painted a St Anthony of Padua with Venice in prayer for the church of the Salute. In 1662, he was knighted by the Doge Francesco Molino.

He was nicknamed il Libertino due to his frequent choice of salacious themes in cabinet pieces.

He painted frescoes of the Battle of the Dardanelles for the Doge's palace; the Slaughter of the Innocents for the church of the Ognissanti in Venice; Noah leaving the Ark in the cathedral at Vicenza; and the Deluge at Santa Maria Maggiore at Bergamo. He is represented at for example Kadriorg Palace, part of the Art Museum of Estonia in Tallinn, Estonia. His masterpiece is likely the altarpiece of Sant' Elena finding the Cross for the church of San Moisè in Venice.

Marco Liberi, his son, was also a painter. Other pupils include Giannantonio Lazzari.
