= Marco Liberi =

Italian painter

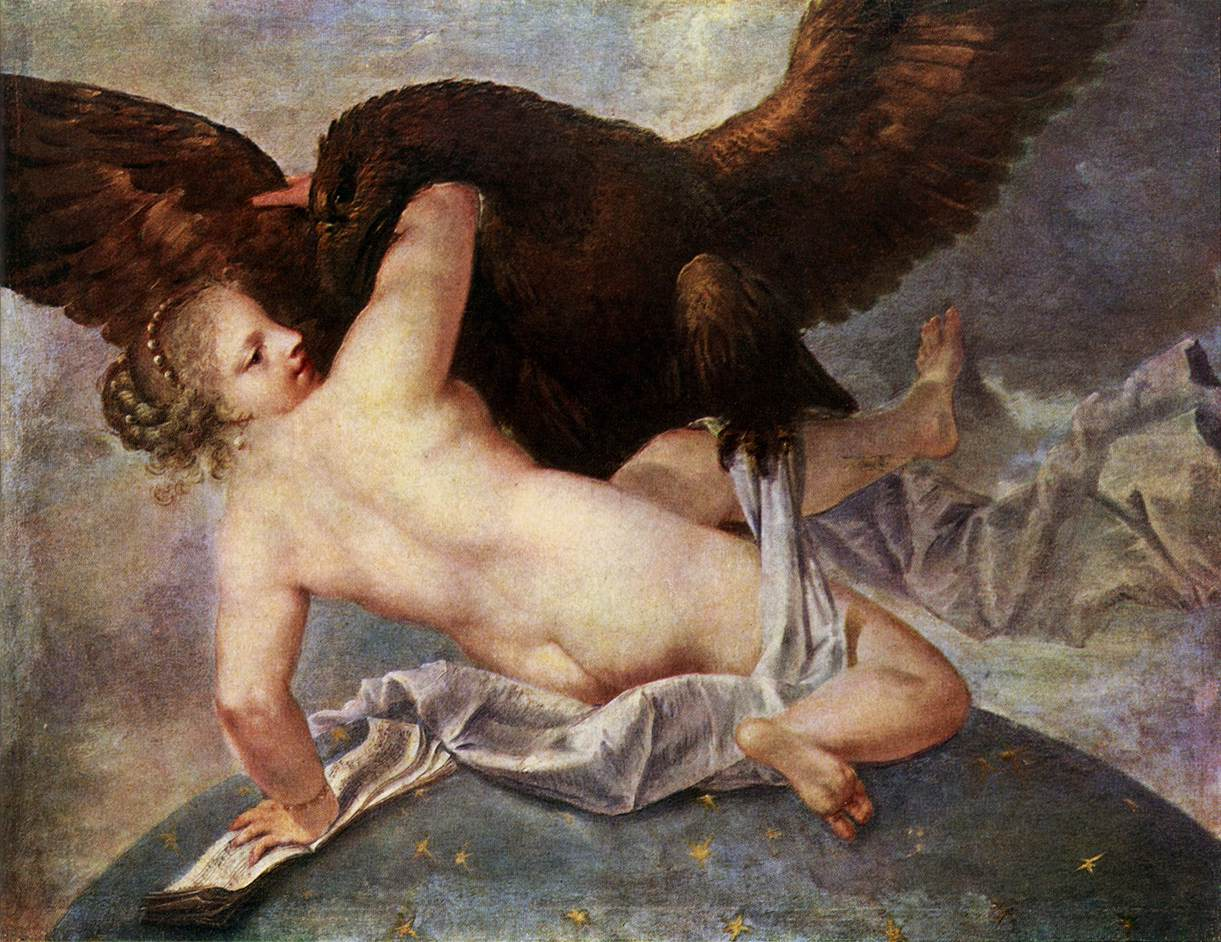
Asteria pursued by Zeus in the form of an eagle by Marco Liberi

Marco Liberi (c.1640 – after 1687) was an Italian painter of the Baroque period. He was the son of the painter Pietro Liberi in Padua, and received his training under his father, whose style he imitated. He was active in Padua and Venice. He is known for cabinet paintings of allegorical, mythological and historical subjects.
