= Filippo Brizzi =

Italian painter (1603–1675)

Filippo Brizzi or Briccio or Brizio (1603–1675) was an Italian painter of the Baroque period. He was born in Bologna, the son of painter and engraver, Francesco Brizzi. Filippo became a pupil of Guido Reni. He painted for the church of San Silvestre at Bologna and also an altar-piece representing Virgin Mary with St. John the Baptist and St. Silvester and St. Giuliano crowned by Angels for the church of San Giuliano.
