= 1615 in art =

Events from the year 1615 in art.

== Events ==
- Easter - Persian Safavid hordes led by Shah Abbas the Great kill all the monks at the David Gareja monastery complex in Georgia and set fire to its collection of manuscripts and works of art.
- September - Inigo Jones appointed Surveyor-General of the King's Works in England.

== Paintings ==
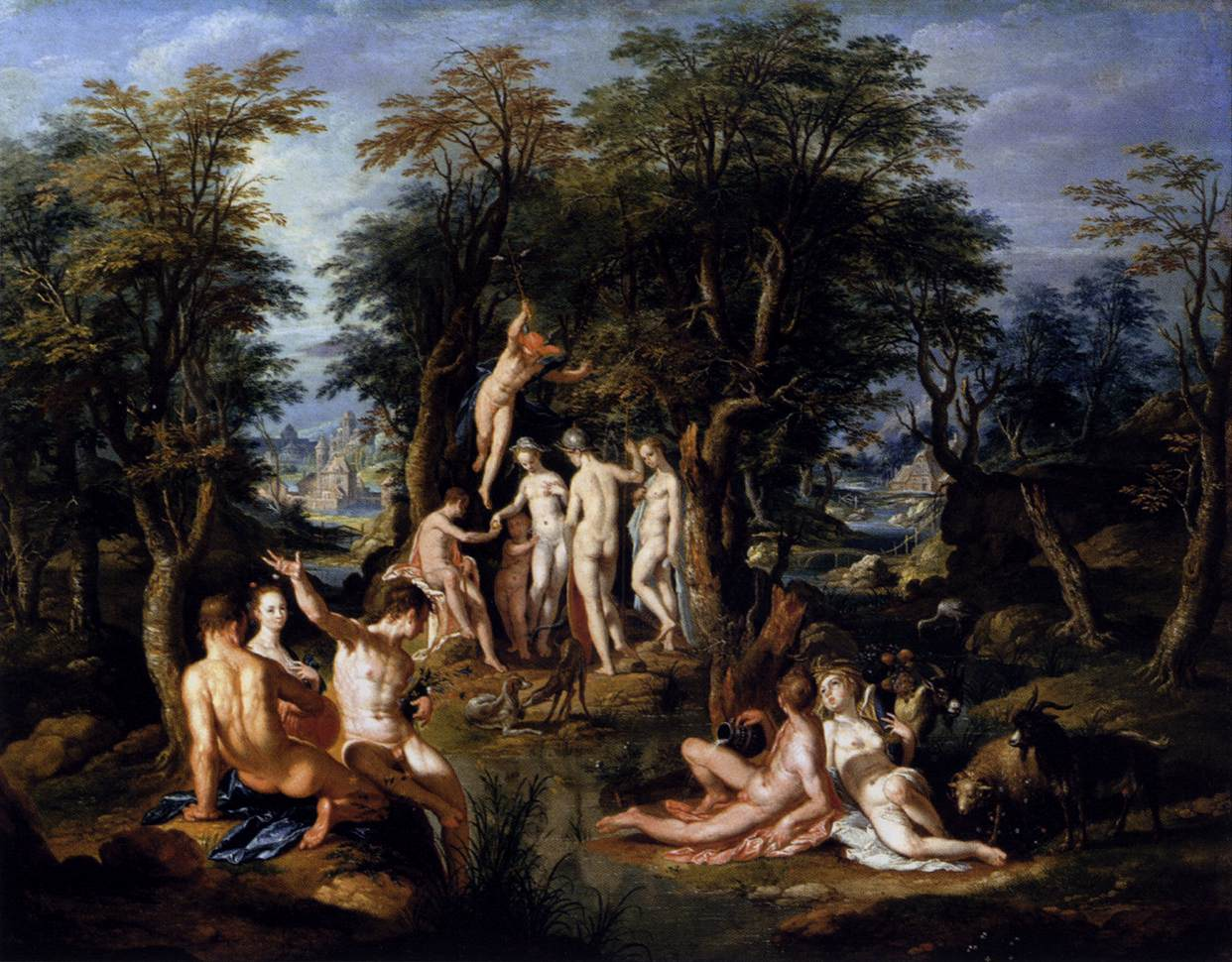
Wtewael - The Judgement of Paris

- Jan Brueghel the Elder and Peter Paul Rubens - The Garden of Eden with the Fall of Man
- Claude Deruet - Hasekura Tsunenaga in Rome
- Domenico Fiasella
  - Christ Healing the Blind
  - Christ Raising the Son of the Widow of Nain
- Jacob Jordaens - Self-Portrait with Parents, Brothers, and Sisters (approximate date)
- Mesrop of Khizan
  - The Baptism of Christ
  - Saint John the Evangelist
- Guido Reni - Aurora and Apollo (or The Triumph of Aurora; ceiling fresco, Casino dell'Aurora, Palazzo Pallavicini-Rospigliosi, Rome)
- Peter Paul Rubens
  - A Statue of Ceres
  - Daniel in the Lion's Den
  - Infanta Isabella Clara Eugenia
  - Venus at the Mirror
- Joachim Wtewael - The Judgement of Paris

== Births ==
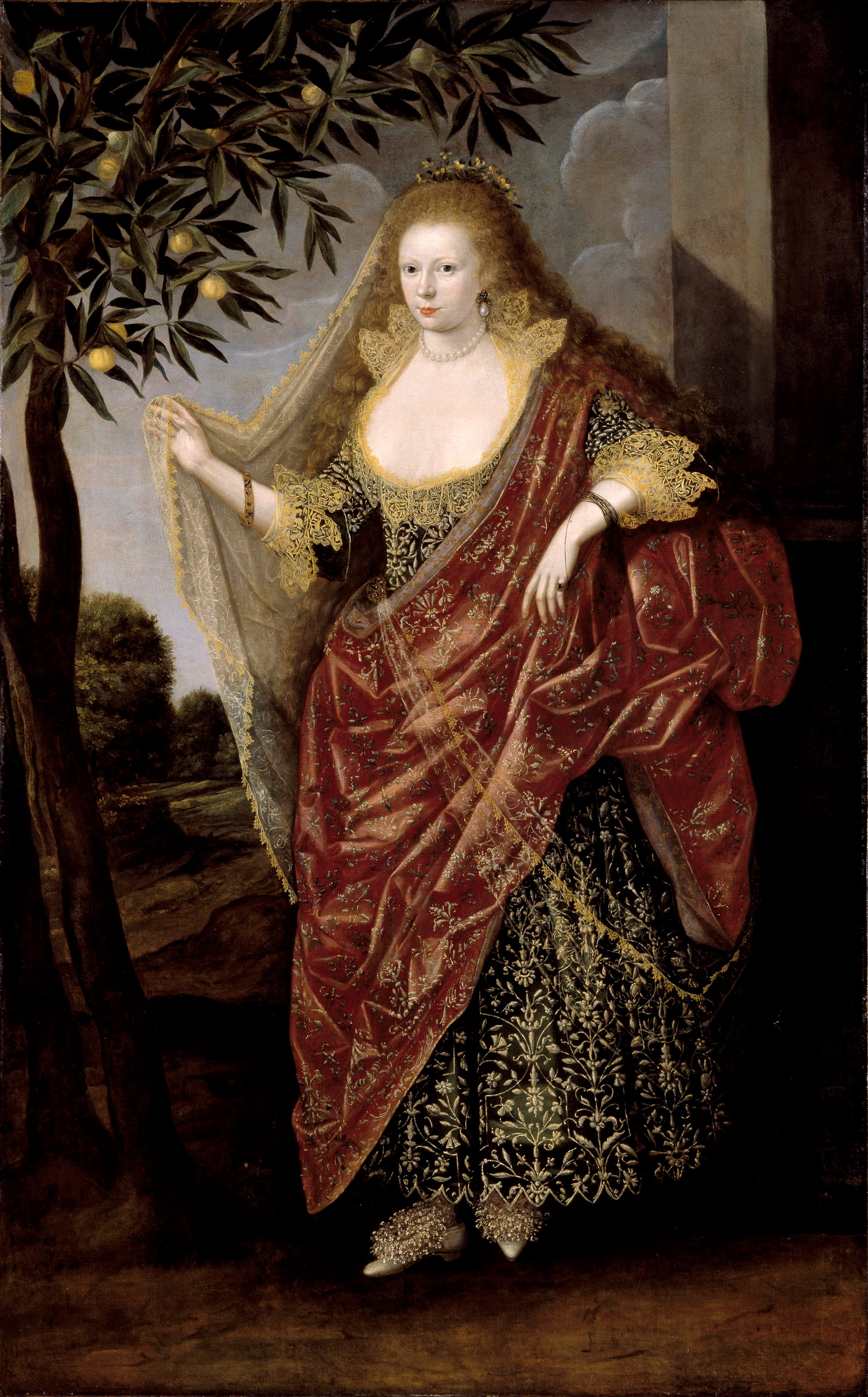
Portrait of a Lady, Called Elizabeth, Lady Tanfield. British School from 17th century- 1615

- January 25 - Govert Flinck, painter of the Dutch Golden Age (died 1660)
- June 20 - Salvator Rosa, Italian painter, poet and printmaker (died 1673)
- date unknown
  - Samuel Bernard, French miniature painter and engraver (died 1687)
  - Alfonso Boschi, Italian painter, active mainly in Florence (died 1649)
  - Pieter de Ring, Dutch painter famous for his opulent, flashy still lifes (died 1660)
  - Gaspard Dughet, French painter (died 1675)
  - Daniel Schultz, Polish-Lithuanian painter (died 1683)
  - Zha Shibiao, landscape painter and calligrapher from Anhui (died 1698)
  - Fyodor Zubov, Russian painter, engraver, miniaturist and illuminator (died 1689)
- probable
  - Luca Forte, Italian painter of still-lifes in Naples (died 1670)
  - Jacob Peter Gowy, Flemish Baroque painter of The Flight of Icarus (died 1661)
  - Abraham van den Hecken, Dutch painter of genre pieces, religious and historical scenes, portraits and still lifes (died 1655)
  - Joris van der Haagen, Dutch painter (died 1669)

== Deaths ==
- March 4 - Hans von Aachen, German mannerist painter (born 1552)
- August 15 - Mir Emad Hassani, Persian Nastaʿlīq script calligrapher (born 1554)
- August 25 - Pietro Francavilla, Franco-Flemish sculptor (born 1548)
- October 18 - Cherubino Alberti or Borghegiano, Italian engraver and painter (born 1553)
- December 23 - Bartolomeo Schedoni, Italian painter (born 1578)
- date unknown
  - Giulio Bruni, Italian painter
  - Jan de Hoey, Dutch painter (born 1544)
  - Francesco Stringa, Italian court painter for Duke Ranuccio I Farnese (born 1578)
  - Cesare Torelli, Italian painter
- probable - Farrukh Beg, Mughal painter who served in the court of Muhammad Hakim (born 1545)
