= Christ Healing the Blind =

Christ Healing the Blind may refer to the following artworks:

- Healing of the Man Born Blind, a painting of 1567 by El Greco in the Gemäldegalerie Alte Meister, Dresden
- Healing of the Man Born Blind, a painting of 1573 by El Greco in the Galleria Nazionale, Parma
- Christ Healing the Blind, a painting of c. 1655–1660 by Philippe de Champaigne
