= Relics of Mary Magdalene =

Set of human remains

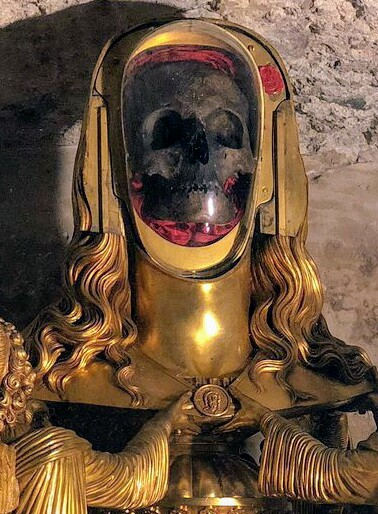
Mary Magdalene's alleged skull, displayed at the basilica of Saint-Maximin-la-Sainte-Baume, in Southern France.

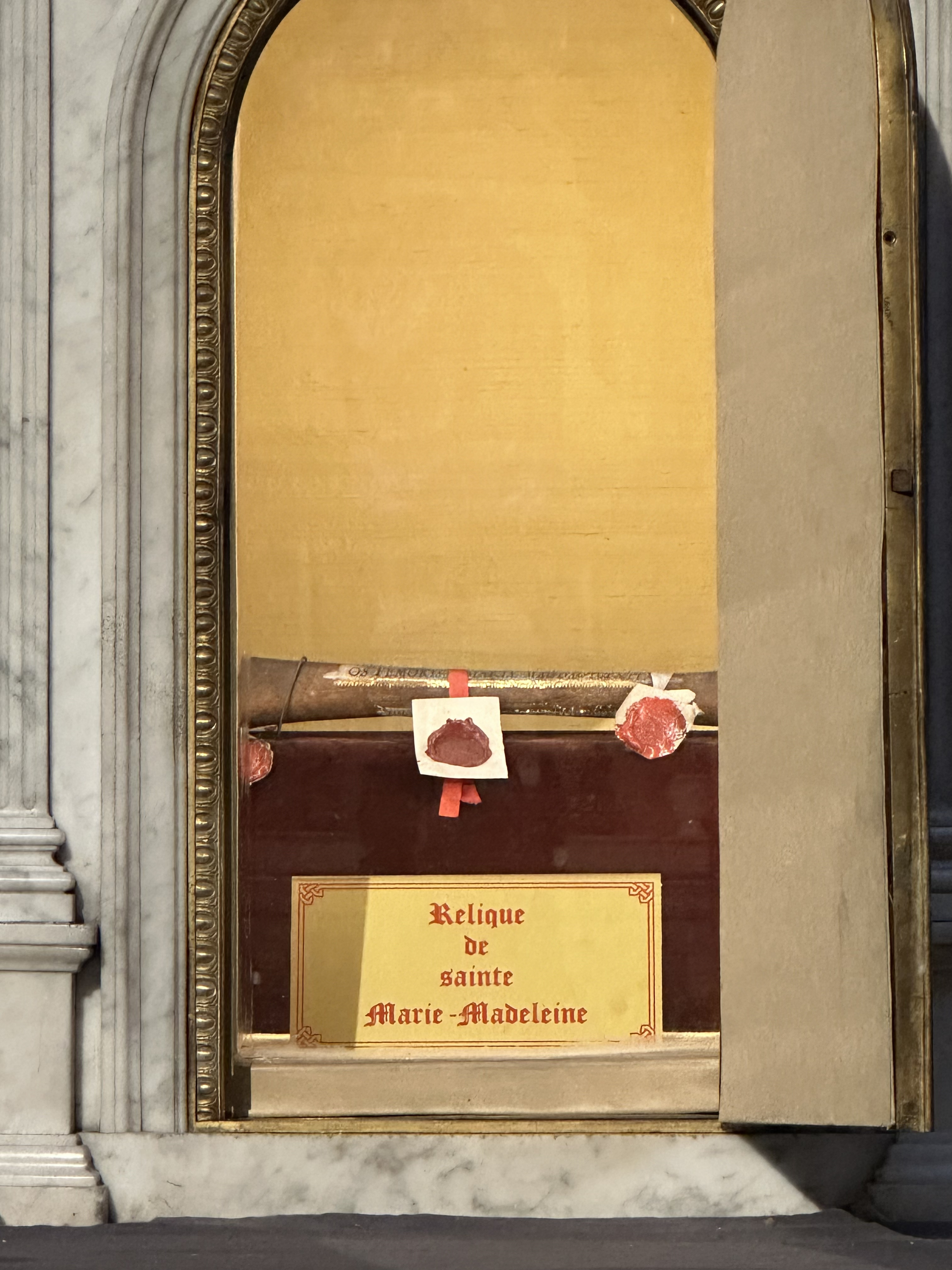
Mary Magdalene's bone, displayed at La Madeleine, Paris

The relics of Mary Magdalene are a set of human remains that purportedly belonged to the Christian saint Mary Magdalene, one of the female followers of Jesus Christ. The most famous relic is a blackened skull, displayed in a golden reliquary at the basilica of Saint-Maximin-la-Sainte-Baume, in Southern France, which has been described as "one of the most precious [relics] in all Christendom" and "one of the world's most famous sets of human remains". Other relics said to have belonged to Mary Magdalene include a foot bone located at the basilica of San Giovanni dei Fiorentini in Italy, a left hand located at the Simonopetra Monastery in Greece, a tooth displayed at the Metropolitan Museum of Art in New York City, and a rib in the Vezelay Abbey, the Basilica of Ste. Magdalene, in Vezelay France.

The purported skull of Mary Magdalene was analyzed in 1974 and has remained sealed inside a glass case since then. Analysis of the skull and photographs of hair found on it indicate it belonged to a woman who was around 50 years old and of Mediterranean descent. However, because the Catholic Church has not allowed removal of any portion of the skull for dating, the year of the woman's death has not been determined as of 2026.

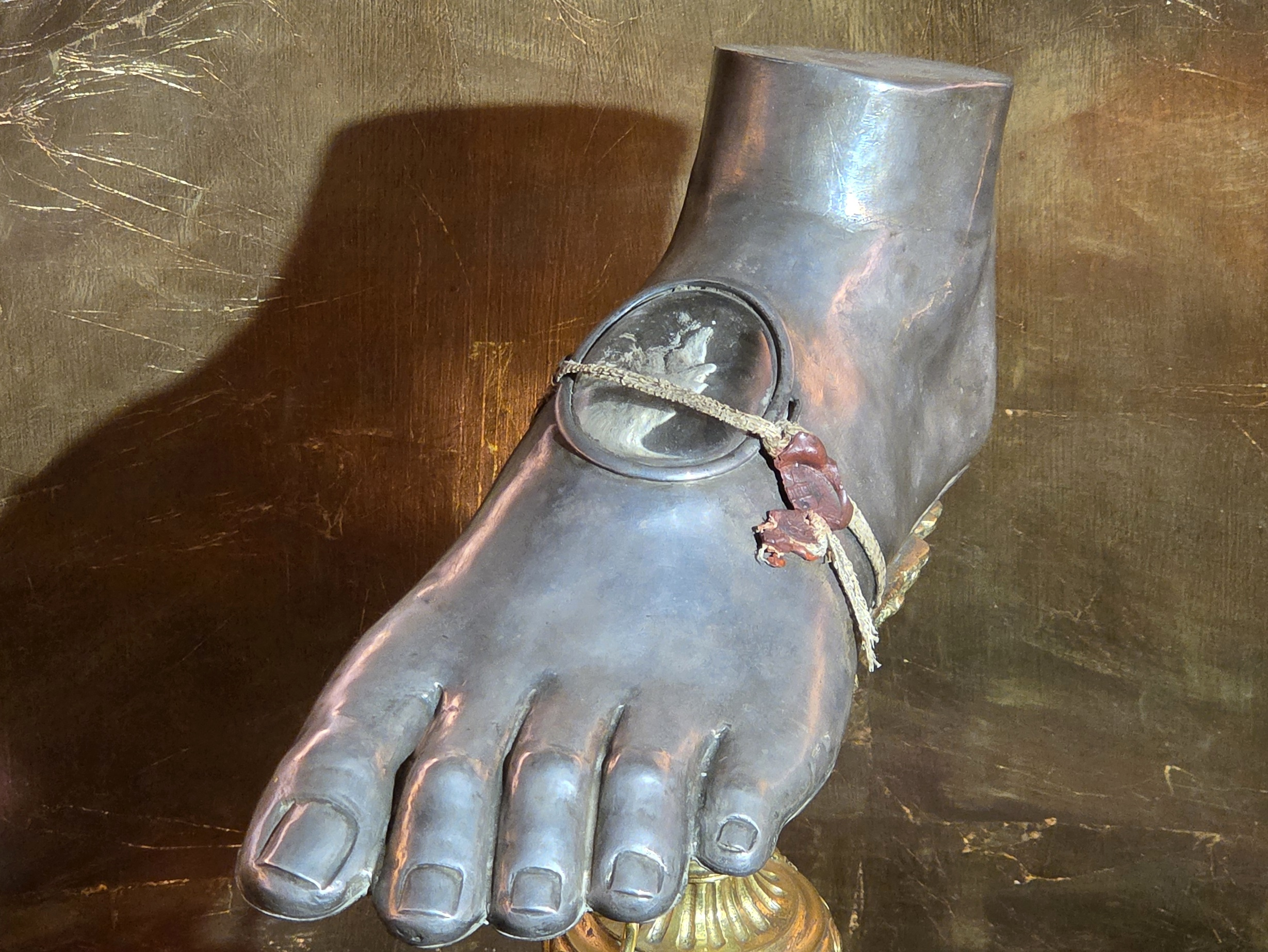
Left foot of Saint Mary Magdalene, kept in the Basilica of San Giovanni de' Fiorentini in Rome.

== See also ==
- List of Christian pilgrimage sites
