= Maximinus of Aix =

First bishop of Aix-en-Provence

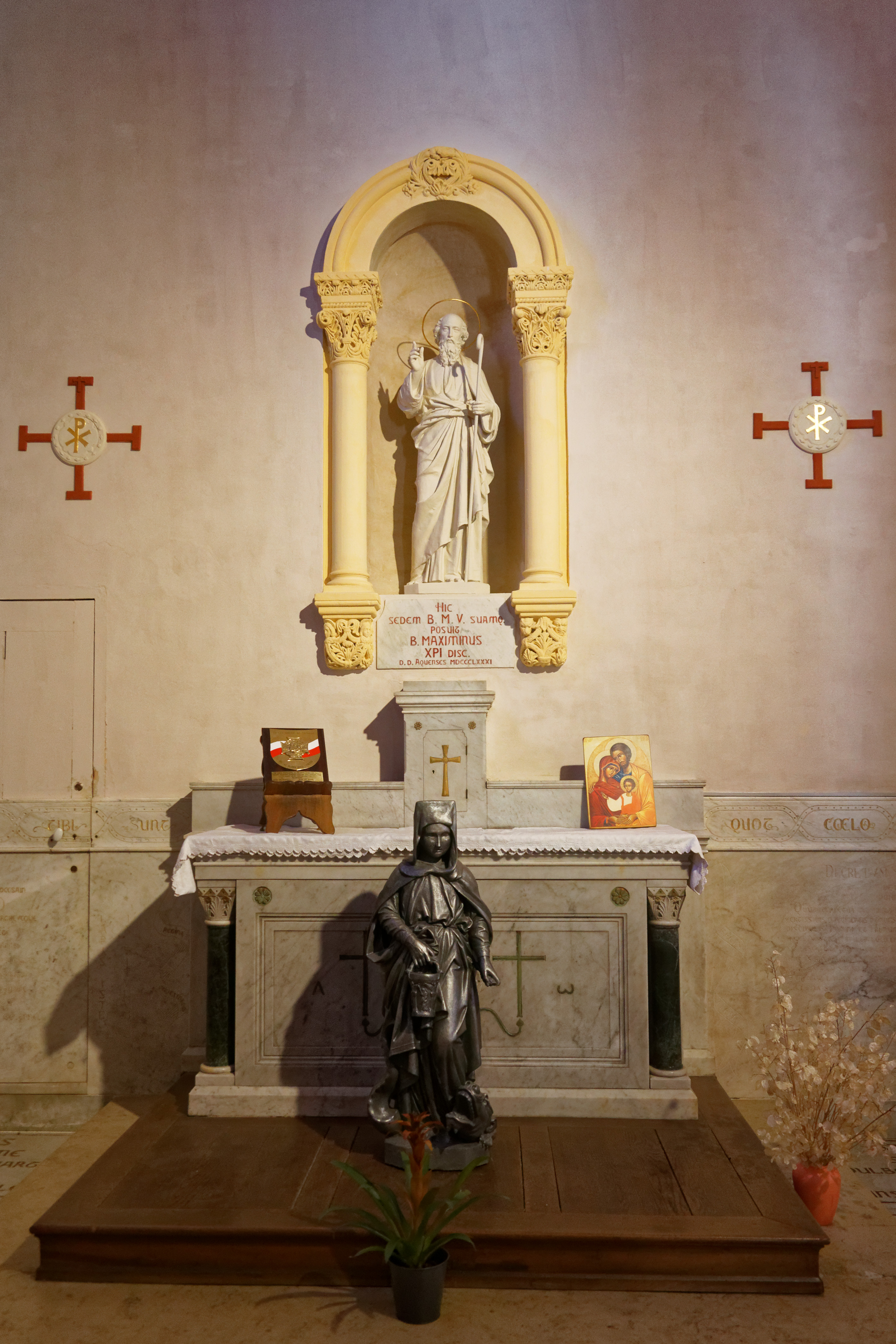
Statue of Maximinus of Aix in the church of Notre-Dame de la Seds in Aix-en-Provence

Saint Maximinus of Aix (French: Maximin d'Aix) was believed to have been the first bishop of Aix-en-Provence in the 1st century. Louis Duchesne indicates that this part of the legend only developed later in the eleventh century. His feast day is June 8.

== Legend ==
According to his legend, he was the steward of the family at Bethany and one of the seventy-two disciples of Jesus. Around the year 42 or 43, he is said to have been put on a ship without rudder and sails by anti-Christian Jews together with Lazarus, Martha and Mary. Other versions say that his traveling companions were "The three Marys", that is, Mary Magdalene and the holy Mary, the wife of Cleophas and Mary, the mother of James. They were put out to sea and left to their fate, but on their mythical journey from Palestine they came to Provençe. (Mary of Bethany is routinely conflated with Mary Magdalen.)

Maximin established his headquarters in the Roman colony of Aquae Sextiæ Salluviorum, the present Aix-en-Provence. He began the evangelisation of the area together with Mary Magdalene. He was visited by Saint Alexander of Brescia and strengthened his faith.

He is traditionally named as the builder of the first chapel on the site of the present Aix Cathedral.

Mary Magdalene later withdrew to the solitude of a cave, which later became a Christian pilgrimage site Sainte-Baume. On the day she knew she was to die she descended into the plain so that Maximinus could give her communion and arrange her burial. Her sarcophagus is now at the Basilica of St Mary Magdalene at Saint-Maximin-la-Sainte-Baume, along with that of Marcella, Suzanne and Maximinus, after whom the place was subsequently named.

He died on 8 June, now the day of his feast. Sidonius (Saint Sidoine) succeeded him as bishop of Aix. In the 3rd or 4th century his remains were placed in a sarcophagus.

The Abbé Duchesne says that this saint, the object of a very ancient local cult, was not considered the first bishop of Aix, or connected with the life of St. Mary Magdalen, except in comparatively recent legends, devised towards the middle of the eleventh century by the monks of Vézelay. Maximinus may have been a bishop of Aix in the 4th or 5th century, but there is no mention of him in the list of bishops of Aix. Dom Basil Watkins says that the legend of Maximinus traveling to France with Mary Magdalen is "worthless".

Maximin was canonized by the confirmation of his cult on 24 November 1900 (the group " Niketius of Besançon and his 10 Companions") by Pope Leo XIII (1878-1903). In art he is depicted as a bishop giving the last sacraments to Mary Magdalene. He is also depicted in a boat with Mary Magdalene, Martha and Lazarus, as an elderly bishop with miter and staff.

He has been confused with Saint Maximin of Trier.

== Sources ==
- Vollständiges Heiligen-Lexikon (1858) (in German)
- Catholic Online
