= Marcella of Marseille =

French legendary saint

Saint Marcella
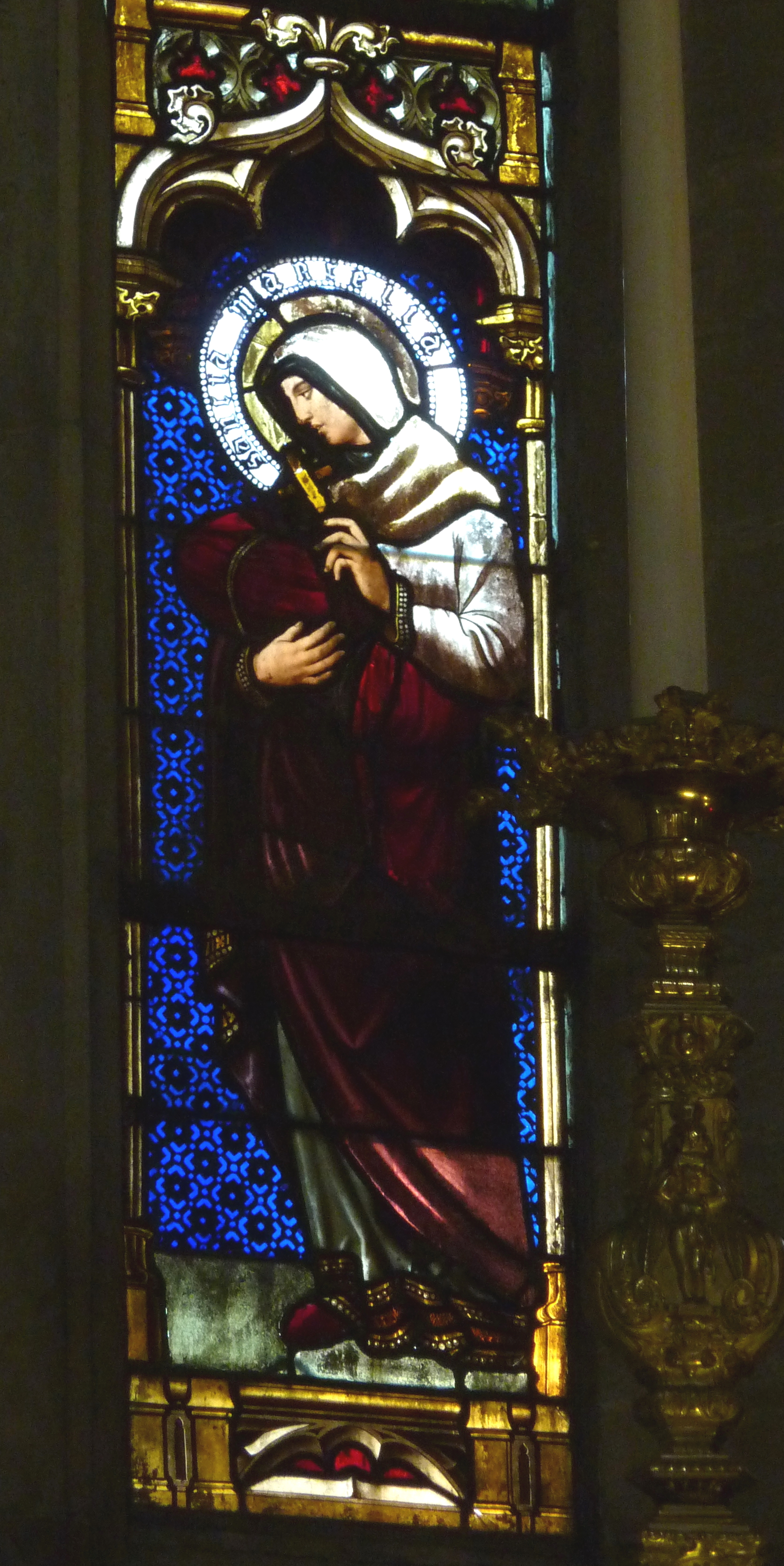
- Stained glass depicting saint Marcella in the Church of Saint Martha in Tarascon, France

Disciple of Jesus
- Born: probably on Bethany, Roman Empire
- Died: Saint-Maximin-la-Sainte-Baume, Roman Empire
- Venerated in: Roman Catholic Church
- Canonized: Pre-Congregation
- Major shrine: Basilica of Saint Mary Magdalene, Saint-Maximin-la-Sainte-Baume
- Feast: 31 January

Marcella, according to Catholic tradition, was a disciple of Jesus and a servant of the brothers of Bethany. She is known for being the companion of Saint Martha during the Christianization of the current French region of Provence.

According to the Golden Legend, Marcella would have been a Christian servant of the siblings Martha, Mary, and Lazarus of Bethany, together with Sarah and Maximinus, also Christians. In the work "The Gospel as It Was Revealed to Me" by Maria Valtorta, Marcella was responsible for announcing the agony of Lazarus and witnessing the resurrection of Jesus together with other women.

When the persecution of Christians in the Holy Land began around the year 44, Marcella, Sara, Maximinus and the brothers of Bethany were thrown into the Mediterranean Sea in a boat without oars that arrived in what is now the French commune of Saintes-Maries-de-la-Mer. Along with them, other Christians: Mary Magdalene, Mary of Clopas and Mary Salome. Some versions also include Susanna, Joseph of Arimathea and Sidonius in the group.

In French territory, the group was welcomed by herders from the region, however they decided to separate to propagate the deeds of Jesus in different places. Marcella accompanied Marthe during her preaching in the ancient Roman province of Viennensis, near the city of Marseille, and later in Avignon, allowing herself to be guided above all by prayers during the evangelization of those people.

Her relics rest with Maximinus, Sidonius and Susanna in the Basilica of Saint Mary Magdalene, in Saint-Maximin-la-Sainte-Baume. Her memory is celebrated annually on January 31 by the Provençals.

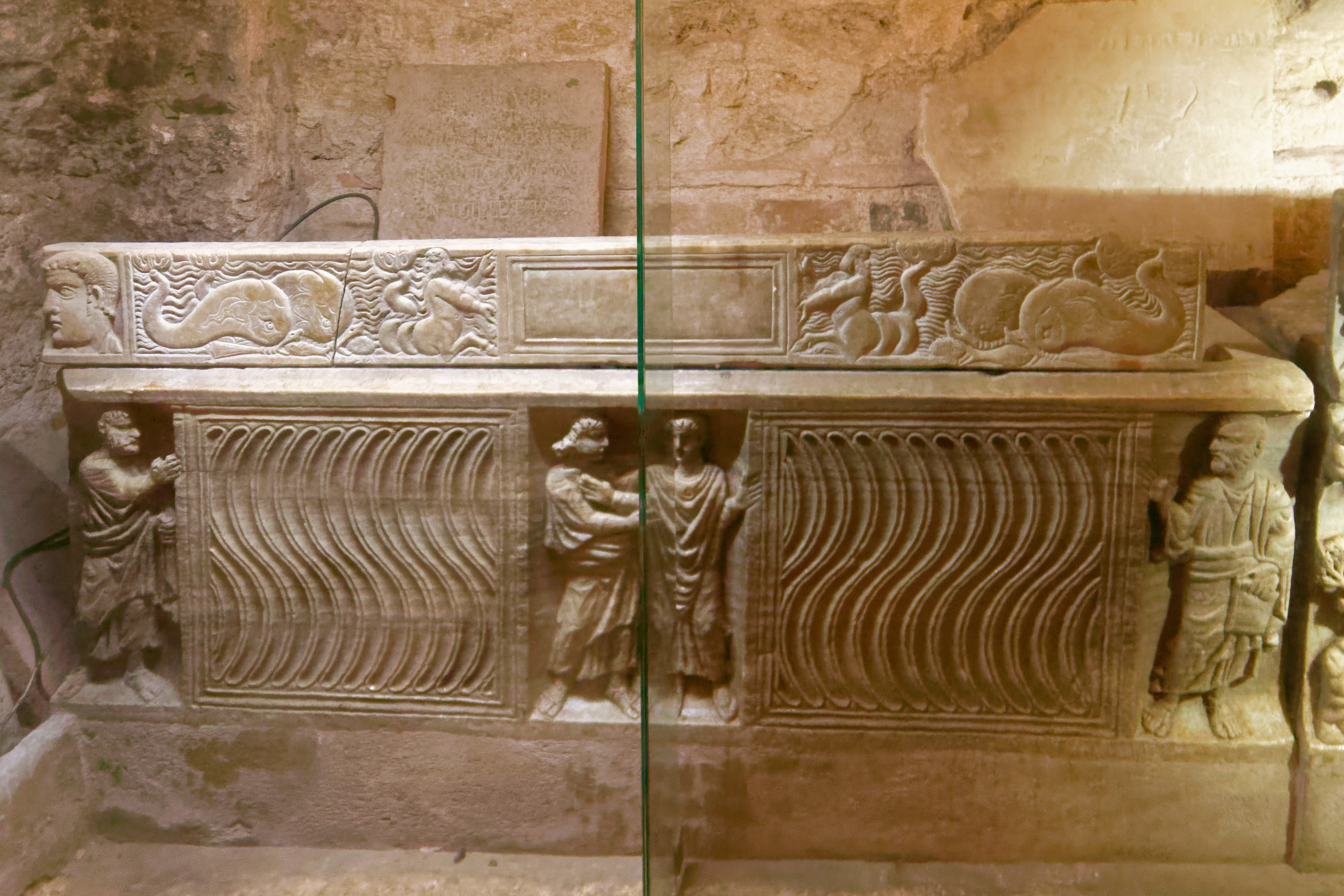
Sarcophagus with the relics of Saint Marcella in the Basilica of Saint Mary Magdalene, in Sainte-Baume

== See also ==
- Jesus at the home of Martha and Mary
- Myrrhbearers
