= Maximin of Trier =

Saint (died 346)

Saint Maximin of Trier
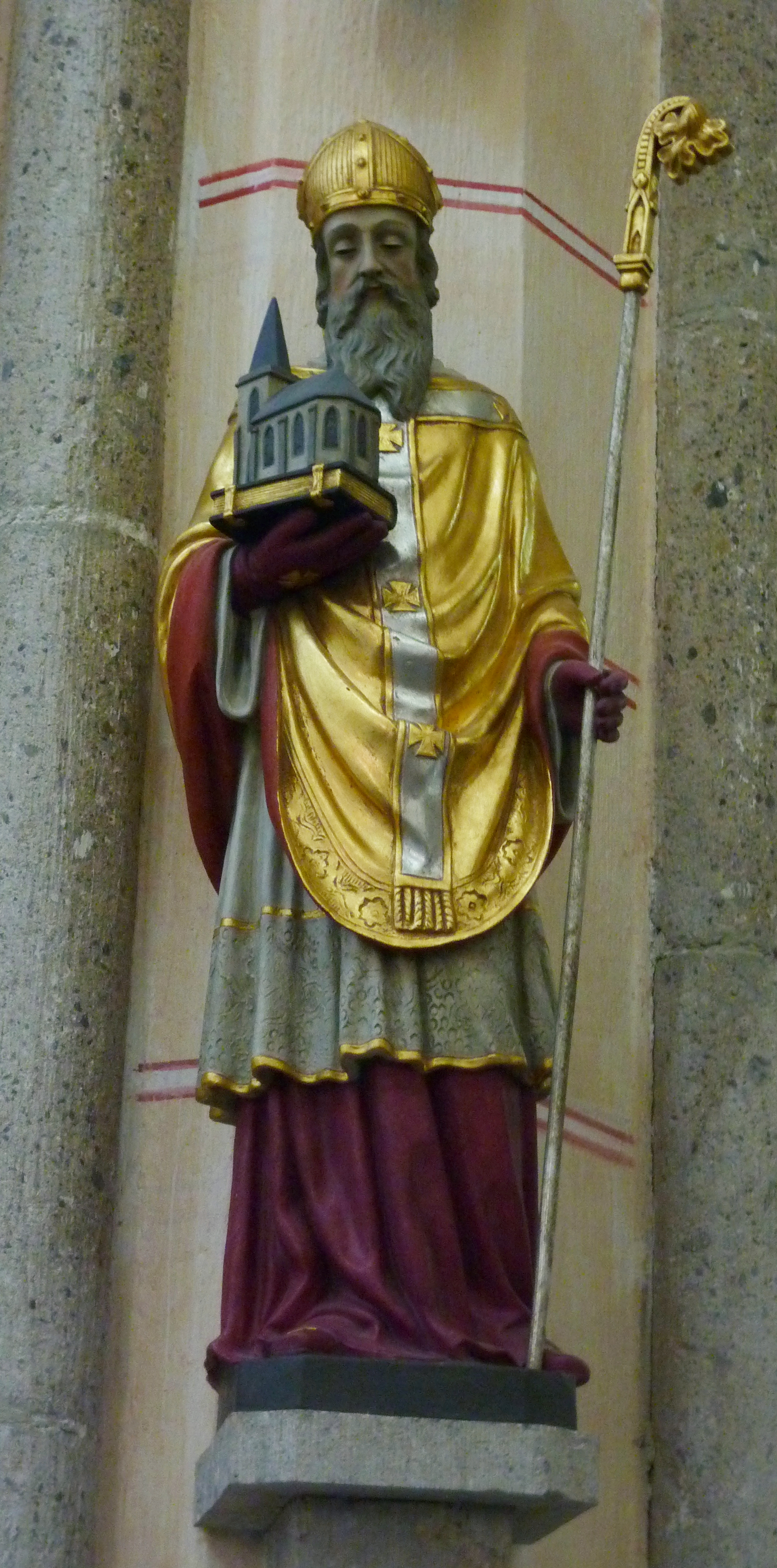
- Ettringen, St. Maximin and Anna
- Died: c. 346 AD; Roman Empire
- Venerated in: Roman Catholic Church; Eastern Orthodox Church
- Canonized: Pre-Congregational Saint
- Major shrine: St. Maximin's Abbey, Trier
- Feast: 29 May
- Attributes: depicted receiving Saint Athanasius at Trier; book; model of a church; bear at his side; commanding a bear to carry his things.
- Patronage: Trier; invoked as protection against perjury, loss at sea and destructive rains

Maximin (born at Silly near Poitiers; — Poitiers 12 September 346) was the sixth bishop of Trier. His feast is 29 May.

== Life ==
Maximin was an opponent of Arianism, and was close to the courts of Constantine II and Constans. He harboured as an honored guest Athanasius twice during his exile from Alexandria, in 336–37 and again in 343. In the Arian controversy he had begun in the party of Paul I of Constantinople; however, he took part in the synod of Sardica convoked by Pope Julius I (ca. 342), and when four Arian bishops consequently came from Antioch to Trier with the purpose of winning Emperor Constans to their side, Maximinus refused to receive them and induced the emperor to reject their proposals.

== Veneration ==
Maximin was interred in the cemetery outside the northern gate of Trier, where his remains were joined by later bishops in the multi-chambered crypt of a church dedicated to John the Evangelist, later rededicated as St. Maximin's Abbey, Trier. Gregory of Tours attests to the cult of Maximin in the church of Saint John Evangelist and the cult offered at his grave. The Abbey – destroyed by Normans in 882, and rebuilt, then entirely re-built in the 1680s, secularised in 1802, bombed in World War II and since largely demolished – was one of the oldest in western Europe.

In iconology Maximin was portrayed as a bishop, with a book, model of a church, and, borrowing from the legend of Corbinian, a bear carrying Maximin's travelling pack. As a patron, Maximin was invoked as protection against perjury, loss at sea and destructive rains. His cultus was strongest in the region around Trier and in Alsace.

Medieval legend conflated him with Maximinus of Aix (French: Maximin d'Aix), who was added to the Seventy Apostles referred to in the Gospel of Luke. That Maximinus was said to have accompanied Mary Magdalene and a company of the faithful to Aix-en-Provence, miraculously sped by a frail boat without a rudder or a mast. After Maximinus became the first Bishop of Aix-en-Provence Mary retired to the "right sharp desert" nearby for thirty years before being found and retrieved by Maximin just before her death. The thirteenth-century telling of the legend can be read in William Caxton's English translation of Jacobus de Voragine's Golden Legend. In fact this part of the legend is lifted from the Eastern story of Mary of Egypt and Zosimas of Palestine. The cultus of Mary Magdalene and this Maximin in Provence was centered at Saint-Maximin-la-Sainte-Baume. Other communes in France named Saint-Maximin commemorate one or the other saints named Maximin.

== See also ==
- Saint Maximin of Trier, patron saint archive

== Notes ==
Titles of the Great Christian Church
Preceded by Agricius	Bishop of Trier; 335–346	Succeeded by Paulinus
