= Healing of the Man Born Blind (El Greco, Parma) =

Painting by El Greco

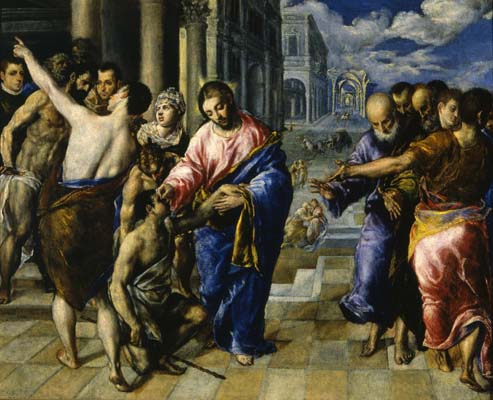
- Artist: El Greco
- Year: c. 1573
- Medium: oil on canvas
- Dimensions: 50 cm × 61 cm (20 in × 24 in)
- Location: Galleria nazionale di Parma, Parma

Healing of the Man Born Blind is a c.1573 painting by El Greco, showing the healing the man blind from birth. It is now in the Galleria nazionale di Parma. It is signed at the bottom right-hand corner. It shows the artist returning to a theme he had first painted five years earlier, in a work now in Dresden.

== History and description ==
In the 17th century it is recorded as being in the Palazzo Farnese in Rome, as shown by a seal on its reverse. It was most probably commissioned directly from the artist by cardinal Alessandro Farnese - the painter had come from Rome to Venice in 1570 and was recommended to Farnese by Giulio Clovio, then in the service of the Farnese family. He had found an admirer in the cardinal's librarian Fulvio Orsini.

Another reason for thinking it was a direct commission are portraits of members of the Farnese family in the background, which are not present in other two paintings by El Greco of the same subject - one is in the Gemäldegalerie in Dresden (produced during his first stay in Venice) and the other in the Metropolitan Museum of Art in New York (from the time of his arrival in Spain). One of the figures in the group on the left seems to be Alexander Farnese, Duke of Parma and in the middle of the line cardinal Ranuccio Farnese, the latter being a post-mortem portrait. The work was sent to Parma in 1662 to hang in the Farnese palace of Palazzo del Giardino - at that time it was misattributed to Tintoretto. It moved to its present home in 1862.

== See also ==
- List of works by El Greco

== Bibliography ==
- (in Italian) Nicoletta Moretti, Scheda dell'opera; in Lucia Fornari Schianchi (a cura di) Galleria Nazionale di Parma. Catalogo delle opere, il Seicento, Milano, 1999
