= Vézelay Abbey =

Vézelay, Church and Hill
UNESCO World Heritage Site
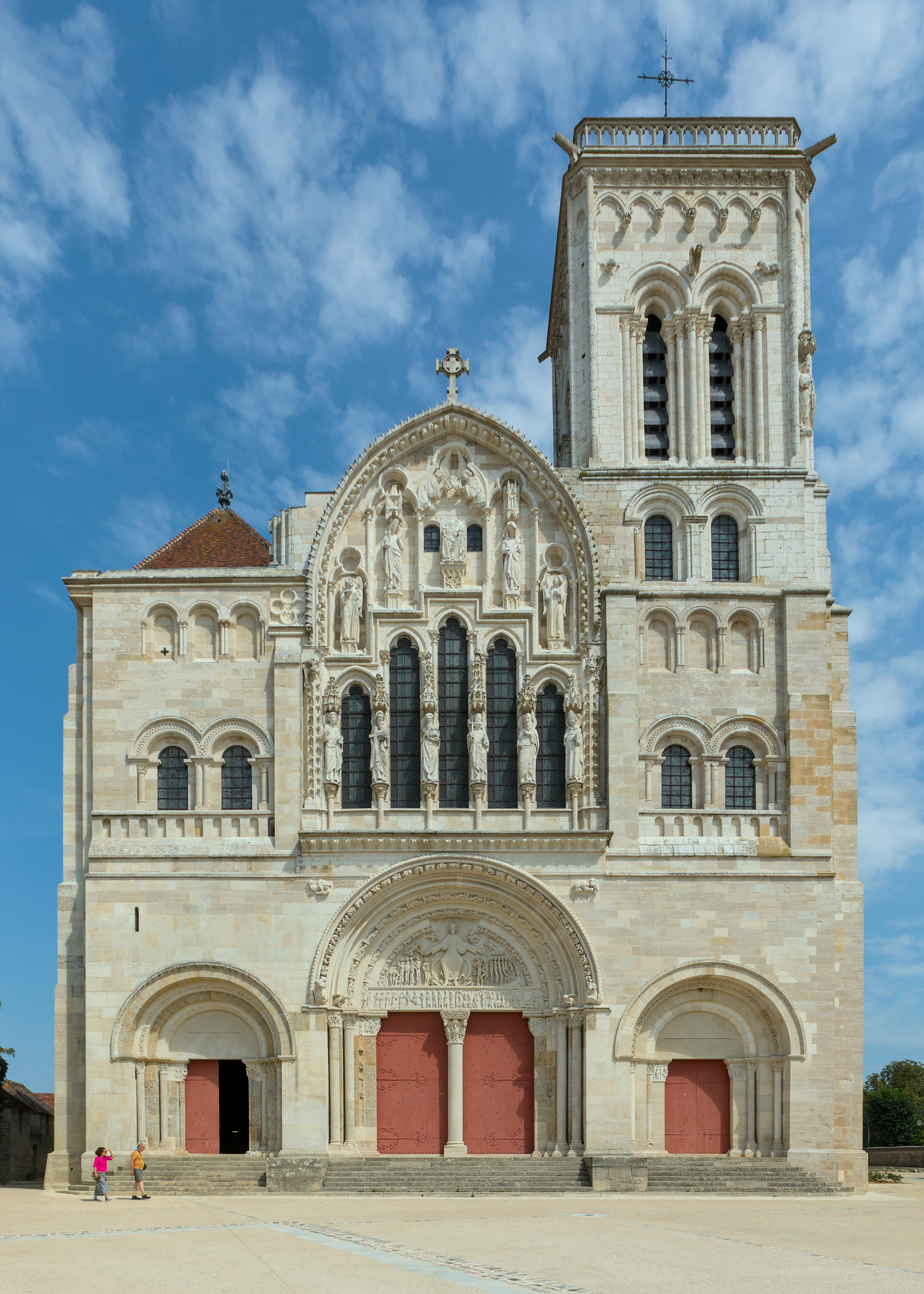
- The abbey church in Vézelay

- Location within Burgundy Location within France
- Location: Burgundy, France
- Criteria: Cultural: i, vi
- Reference: 84
- Inscription: 1979 (3rd Session)
- Area: 183 ha (450 acres)
- Buffer zone: 18,373 ha (45,400 acres)
- Website: www.basiliquedevezelay.org
- Coordinates: 47°27′59″N 3°44′55″E

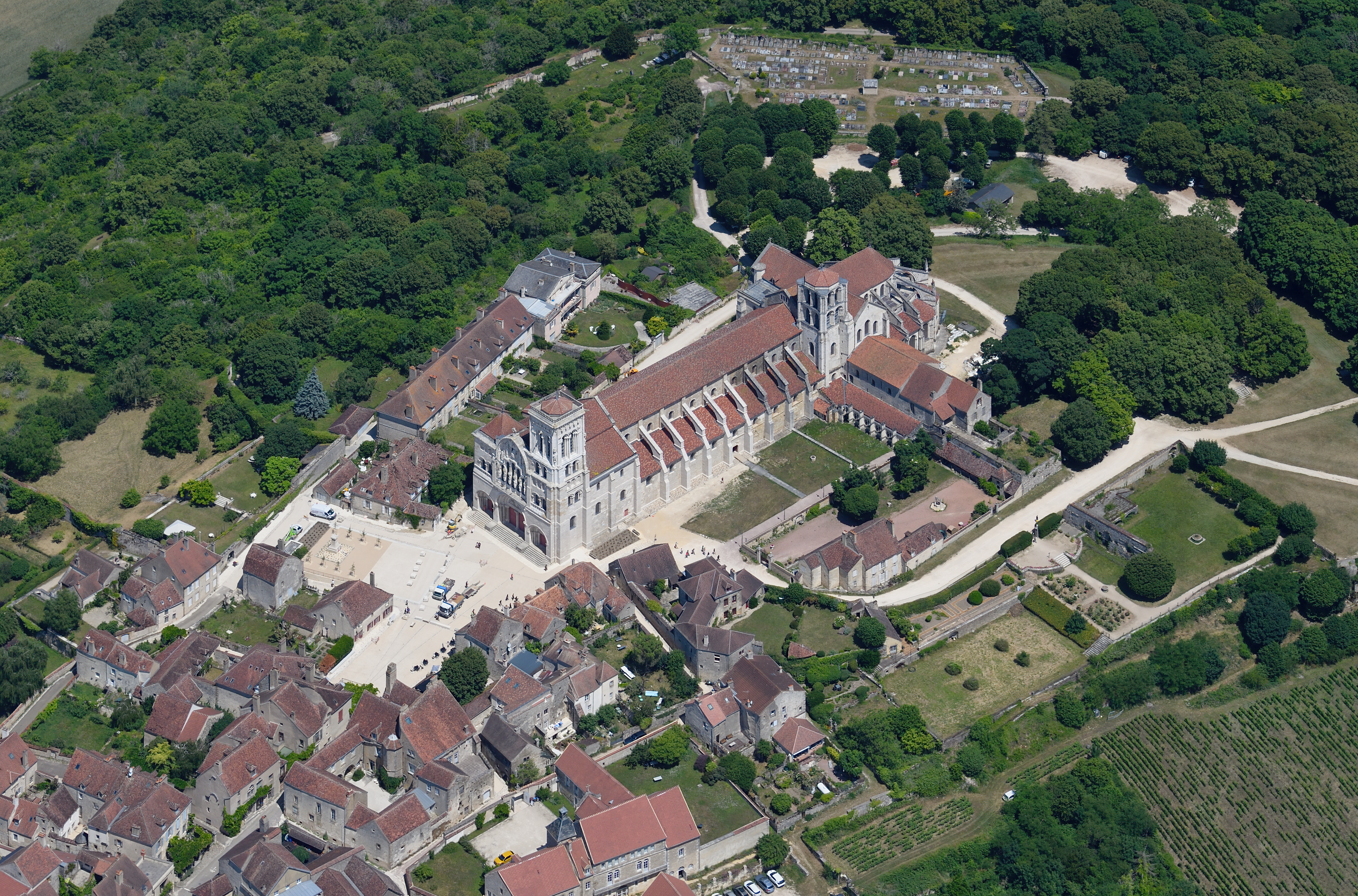
Aerial view

Vézelay Abbey (French: Abbaye Sainte-Marie-Madeleine de Vézelay) is a Benedictine and Cluniac monastery in Vézelay in the east-central French department of Yonne. It was constructed between 1120 and 1150. The Benedictine abbey church, now the Basilica of Sainte-Marie-Madeleine (Saint Mary Magdalene), with its complex program of imagery in sculpted capitals and portals, is one of the great masterpieces of Burgundian Romanesque art and architecture. Sacked by the Huguenots in 1569, the building suffered from neglect in the 17th and the 18th centuries and further damage during the French Revolution.

The church and hill at Vézelay were added to the UNESCO list of World Heritage Sites in 1979 because of their importance in medieval Christianity and outstanding architecture. Relics of Mary Magdalene can be seen inside the Basilica.

== History ==
=== Early history ===
The Benedictine abbey was founded on land that had been a late Roman villa, of Vercellus (Vercelle becoming Vézelay). The villa had passed into the hands of the Carolingians and devolved to a Carolingian count, Girart, of Roussillon. The two convents he founded there were looted and dispersed by Moorish raiding parties in the 8th century, and a hilltop convent was burnt by Norman raiders. In the 9th century, the abbey was refounded under the guidance of Badilo, who became an affiliate of the reformed Benedictine order of Cluny. Vézelay also stood at the beginning of one of the four major routes through France for pilgrims going to Santiago de Compostela in Galicia, in the north-western corner of Spain.

Around 1050, the monks of Vézelay began to claim to hold the relics of Mary Magdalene, brought, they said, from the Holy Land either by their 9th-century founder-saint, Badilo, or by envoys despatched by him. A little later a monk of Vézelay declared that he had detected in a crypt at St-Maximin in Provence, carved on an empty sarcophagus, a representation of the Unction at Bethany, when Jesus' head was anointed by Mary of Bethany, who was assumed in the Middle Ages to be Mary Magdalene. The monks of Vézelay pronounced this to be Mary Magdalene's tomb, from which her relics had been translated to their abbey. Freed captives then brought their chains as votive objects, and it was the newly elected Abbot Geoffroy in 1037 who had the ironwork melted down and reforged as wrought iron railings surrounding the Magdalene's altar. Thus the erection of one of the finest examples of Romanesque architecture which followed was made possible by pilgrims to the declared relics and these tactile examples demonstrating the efficacy of prayers. Mary Magdalene is the prototype of the penitent, and Vézelay has remained an important place of pilgrimage for the Catholic faithful, though the actual claimed relics were torched by Huguenots in the 16th century.

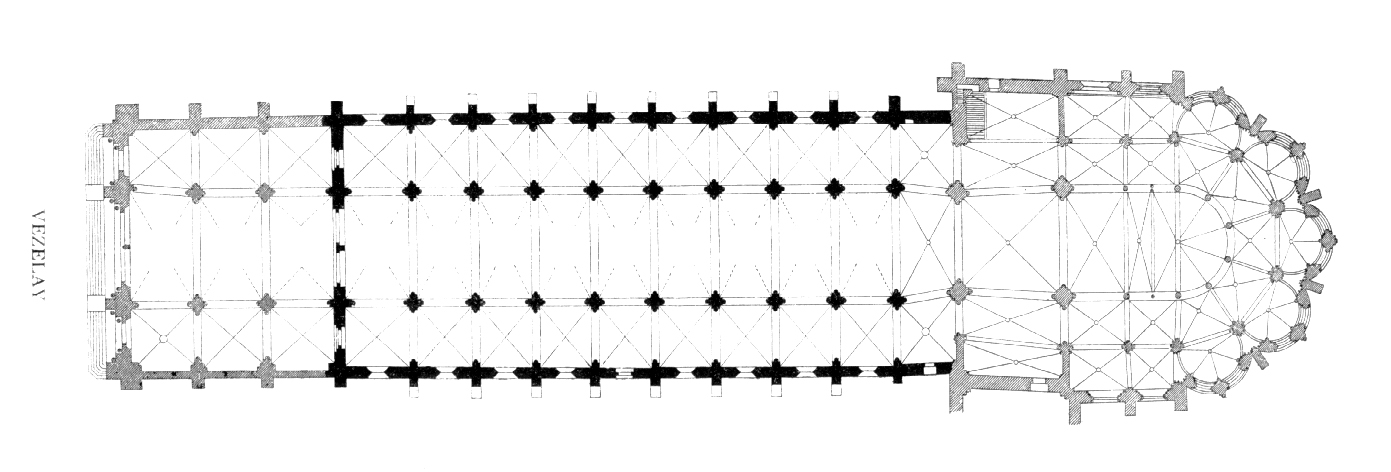
Floorplan of Vézelay shows the adjustment in vaulting between the choir and the new nave.

To accommodate the influx of pilgrims, a new abbey church was begun, dedicated on April 21, 1104, but the expense of building so increased the tax burden on the abbey's lands that the peasants revolted and killed the abbot. The crush of pilgrims was such that an extended narthex was built, inaugurated by Pope Innocent II in 1132. Saint Bernard of Clairvaux preached at Vézelay in favor of a second crusade at Easter 1146, in front of King Louis VII. Richard I of England and Philip II of France met there and spent three months at the Abbey in 1190 before leaving for the Third Crusade. Thomas Becket, in exile, chose Vézelay for his Whitsunday sermon in 1166, announcing the excommunication of the main supporters of the English King, Henry II, and threatening the King with excommunication too. The nave, which had been burnt once, with great loss of life, burned again in 1165, after which it was rebuilt in its present form.

The abbey's self-assured monastic community was prepared to defend its liberties and privileges against all comers: the bishops of Autun, who challenged its claims to exemption; the counts of Nevers, who claimed jurisdiction in their court and rights of hospitality at Vézelay; the abbey of Cluny, which had reformed its rule and sought to maintain control of the abbot within its hierarchy; the townsmen of Vézelay, who demanded a modicum of communal self-government.

The beginning of Vézelay's decline coincided with the well-publicized discovery in 1279 of the body of Mary Magdalene at Saint-Maximin-la-Sainte-Baume in Provence, given regal patronage by Charles II, the Angevin king of Sicily. When Charles erected a Dominican convent at La Sainte-Baume, the shrine was found intact, with an explanatory inscription stating why the relics had been hidden. The local Dominican friars compiled an account of miracles that these relics had wrought. This discovery undermined Vézelay's position as the principal shrine of the Magdalene in Europe.

After the French Revolution, Vézelay stood in danger of collapse. In 1834 the newly appointed French inspector of historical monuments, Prosper Mérimée warned that the structure was at imminent risk of collapse, and on his recommendation, Eugène Viollet-le-Duc was appointed to supervise a massive restoration, undertaken in several stages between 1840 and 1861. During restoration, his team replaced a great deal of the weathered and vandalized sculpture, as well as the flying buttresses supporting the nave.

== Interpretation of the tympanum ==
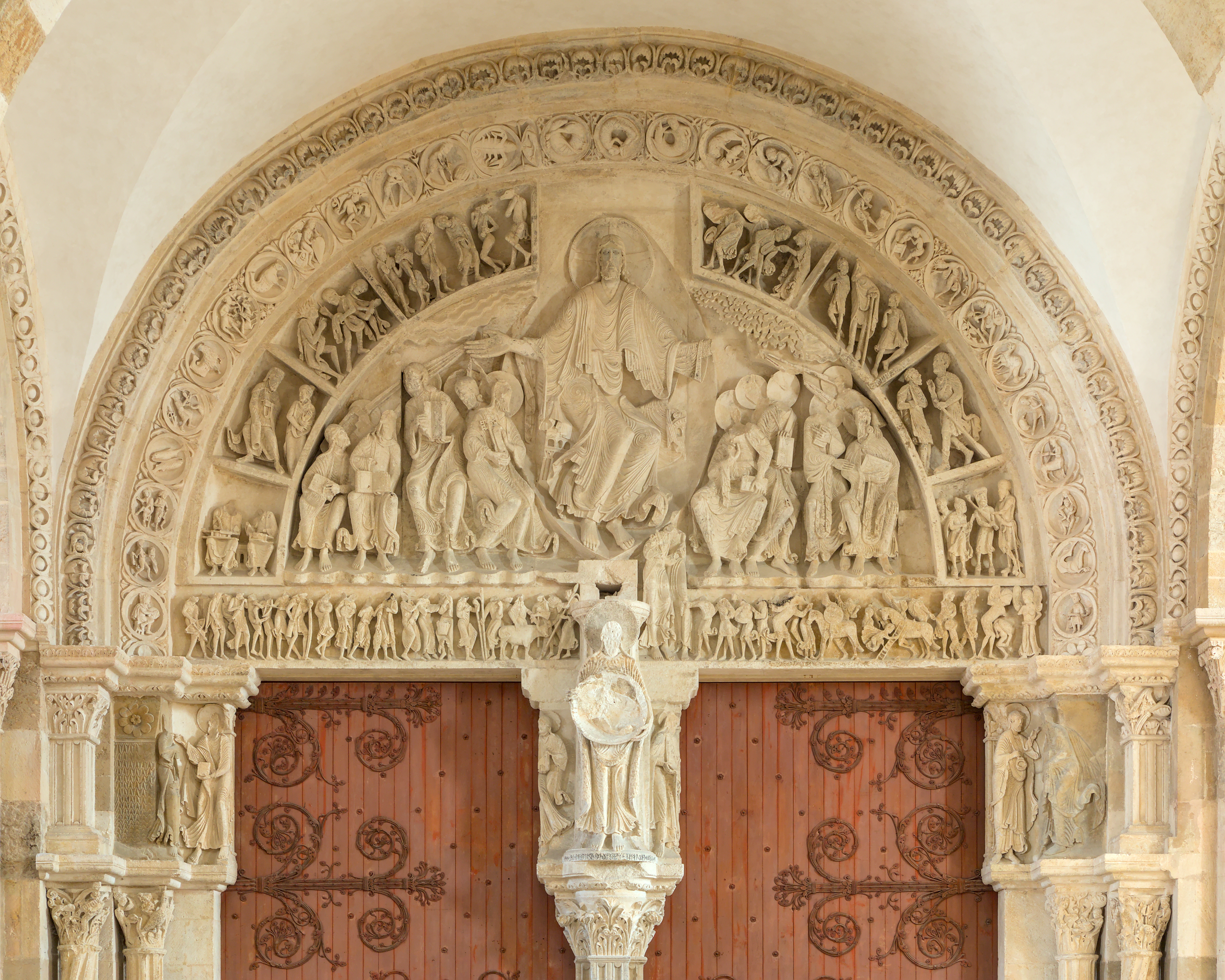
The tympanum of the central portal.

The tympanum of the central portal of the Madeleine de Vézelay is different from its counterparts across Europe. From the beginning, its tympanum was specifically designed to function as a spiritual defense of the Crusades and to portray a Christian allegory to the Crusaders' mission. When compared to contemporary churches such as St. Lazare d'Autun and St. Pierre de Moissac, the distinctiveness of Vézelay becomes apparent. Unlike many Romanesque church portals that focus on the Last Judgement, the Vézelay tympanum depics Christ sending the Apostles to spread Christianity throughout the world. This imagery reinforced the abbey's connection to the Crusades and the Christian mission of evangelization.

The art historian George Zarnecki wrote, "To most people the term Romanesque sculpture brings to mind a large church portal, dominated by a tympanum carved with an apocalyptic vision, usually the Last Judgment." This is true in most cases, but Vézelay is an exception. In a 1944 article, Adolf Katzenellenbogen interpreted Vézelay's tympanum as referring to the First Crusade and depicting the Pentecostal mission of the Apostles.

Thirty years before the Vézelay tympanum was carved, Pope Urban II planned on announcing his call for a crusade at La Madeleine. In 1095, Urban altered his plans and preached for the First Crusade at the Council of Clermont, but Vézelay remained a central figure in the history of the crusades. The tympanum was completed in 1130. Fifteen years after its completion, Bernard of Clairvaux chose Vézelay as the place from which he would call for a Second Crusade. Vézelay was even the staging point for the Third Crusade. It is there that King Richard the Lionheart of England and King Philip Augustus of France met and joined their armies for a combined western invasion of the holy land. It is appropriate, therefore, that Vézelay's portal reflect its place in the history of the crusades.

The art historian Peter Low argues for the central tympanum as a visualization of both the Pentecost and a passage from book of Ephesians chapter 2—proclaiming to the visiting laity the tenets of Benedictine monasticism and to visiting pilgrims the extent and reach of a universalizing church that welcomes "the full, even monstrous range of the globe's inhabitants."

=== Lintel ===
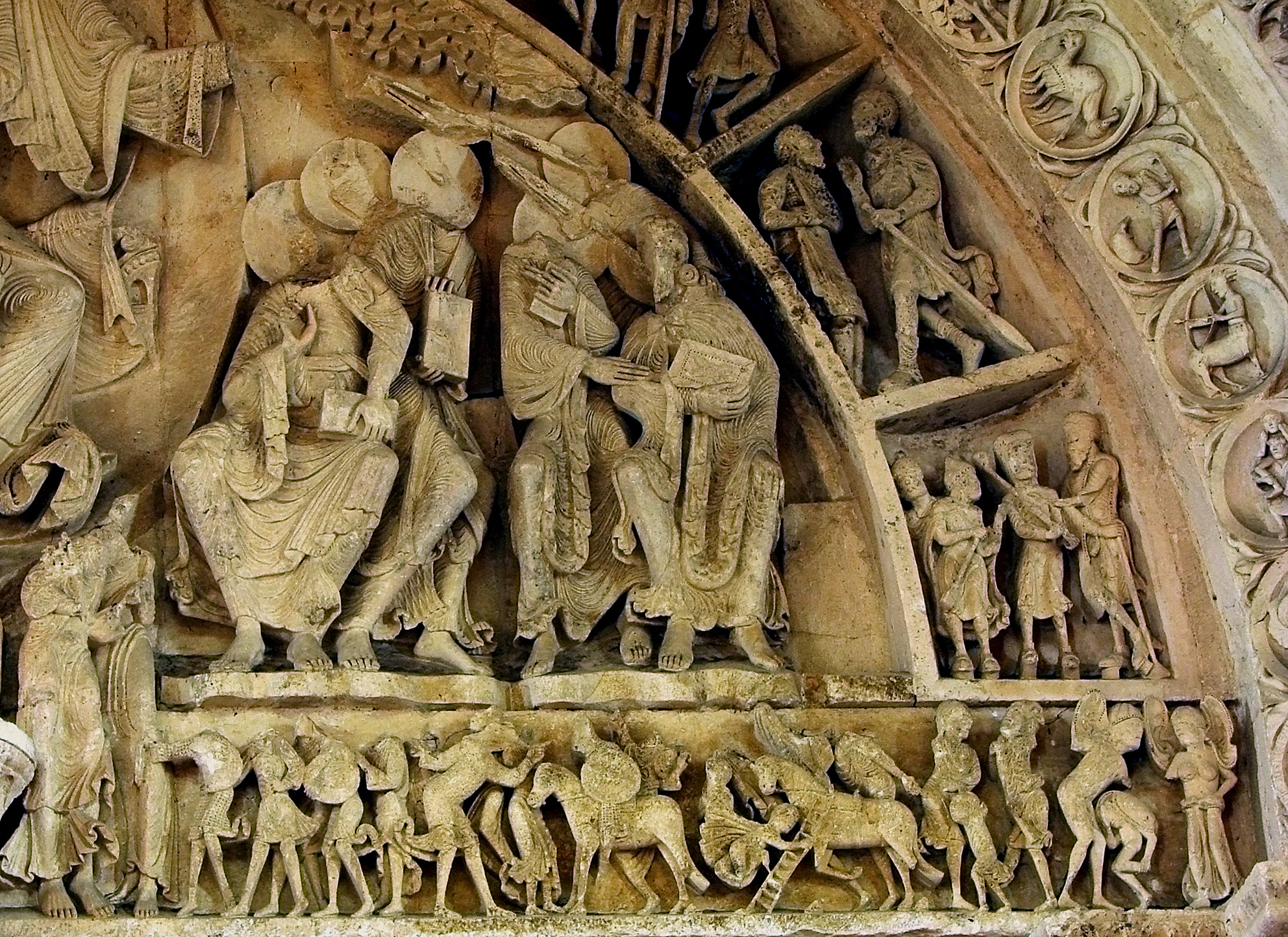
Detail of right side

The lintel of the Vézelay portal portrays the "ungodly" people of the world. It is a depiction of the first Pentecostal Mission to spread the word of God to all the people of the world. The figures in the tympanum who have not received the Word of God are depicted as not fully human. Some are shown with pig snouts, others are misshapen, and several are depicted as dwarves. One pygmy in particular is depicted as mounting a horse with the assistance of a ladder. On the far right, there is a man with elephantine ears, while in the center we see a man covered in feathers. The architects and artisans depicted the unbelievers as physically grotesque in order to provide a visual image of what they saw as the non-believers' moral turpitude. This is a direct reflection of Western perceptions of foreigners such as the Moors, who were being specifically targeted by the Crusaders. Even Pope Urban II, in his call for a crusade, helped promote this ethnocentric perception of the Turks by calling on westerners to, "exterminate this vile race." Most Westerners had absolutely no idea what the Turks and Muslims looked like, and they assumed that an absence of Christianity must coincide with repulsive physical attributes. It has also been argued that the disbelievers were carved as deformed monsters in an effort to dehumanize them. By dehumanizing their enemies in art, the Crusaders' mission to capture the holy land and convert or kill the Muslims was glorified and sanctified. The Vézelay lintel is, therefore, a political statement as well as a religious one.

=== Comparison with other contemporary portals ===
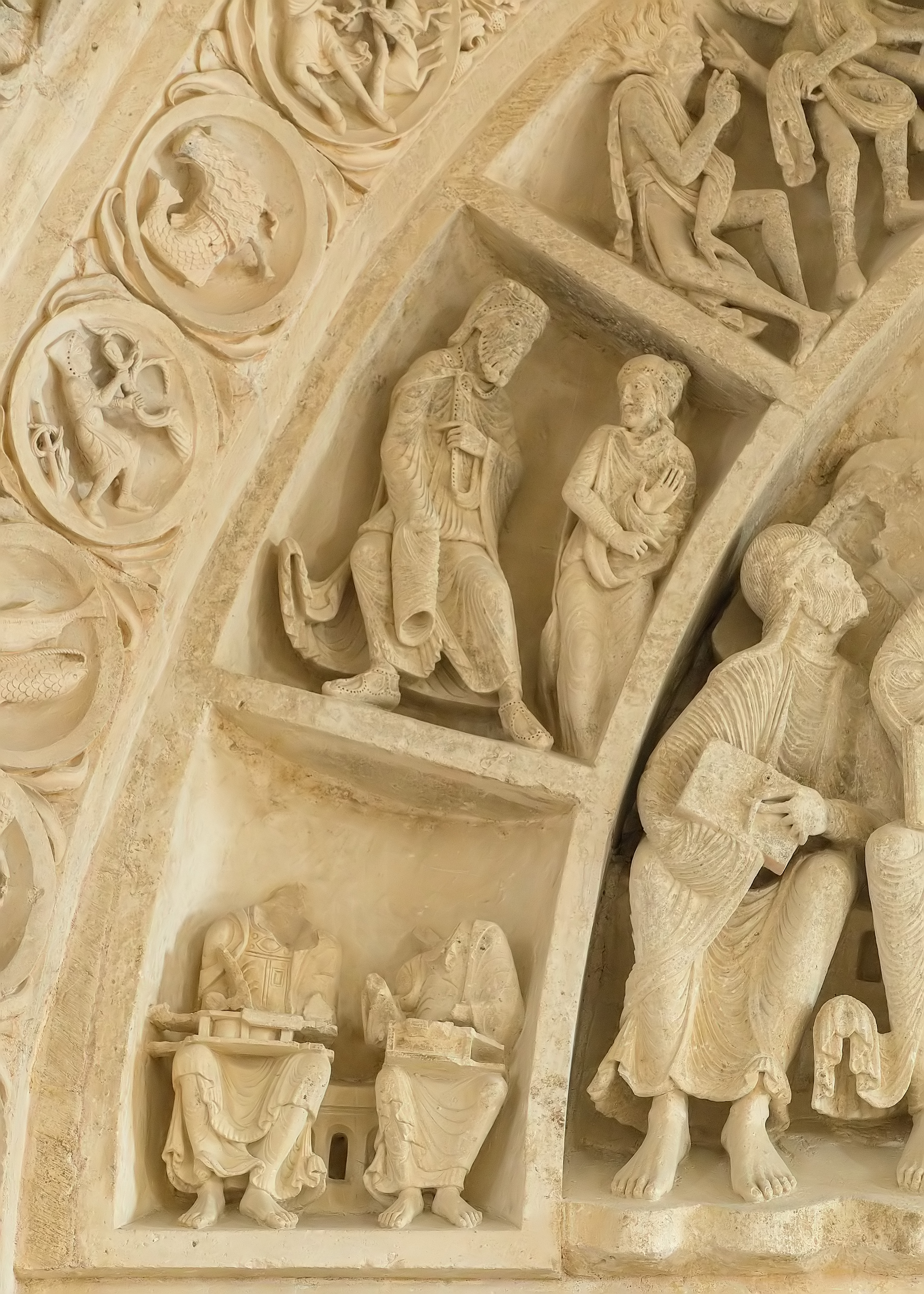
Details of left side : two paralytics show their arms (top), two gospelists write what they've seen (bottom) and an apostle stares at Christ (right).

Vézelay's political motivation becomes all the more apparent when compared with contemporary portal designs from other churches around France. The Vézelay lintel is distinct, but some comparisons can be made between it and other Romanesque portal sculptures of the time. Vézelay's lintel is comparable to the St. Lazare lintel in Autun in that both show humans who have sinned. While the Vézelay lintel is devoted to the depiction of "heathens," the Autun lintel shows the damned souls on Judgment Day. The similarity between both lintels is due in large part to the fact that the same master artisan, Master Gislebertus, was the primary architect on both sites. "Gislebertus ... began his career at Cluny, then worked on the original west facade at Vézelay, and c. 1120 moved to Autun." In addition, the two tympana are similar in that they follow the tradition of placing the exaggerated Christ in the center of the image. Here is where the similarity stops, however. Autun is more traditional and typical of the Romanesque portal carvings. It depicts the Second Coming, which is a popular and typical depiction in Romanesque art. Frightful images of demons abound. The goals of the two different tympana are reflected in their design; Autun is designed to frighten people back to church while Vézelay is designed as a political statement to support the crusades.

=== Lower compartments ===
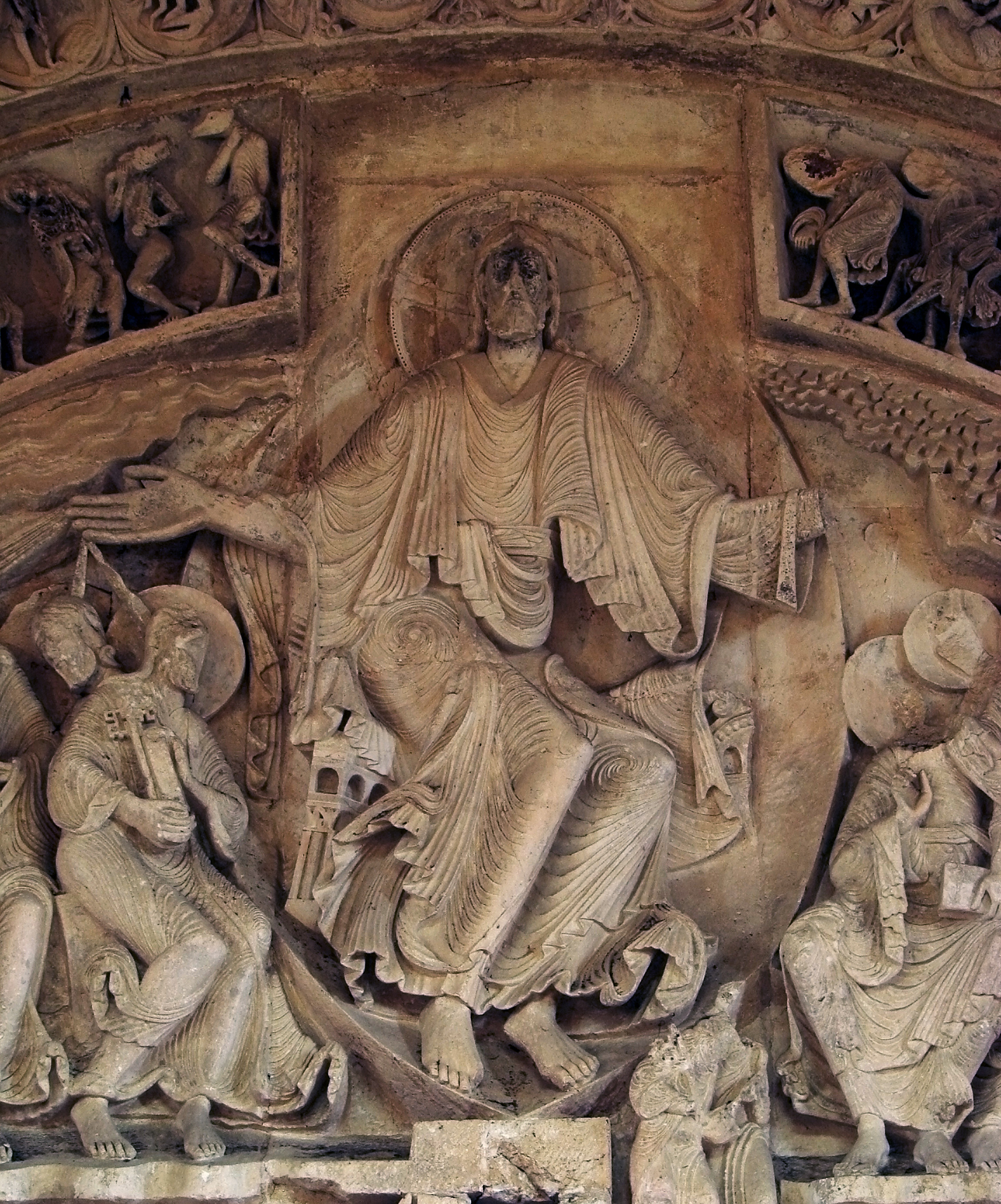
Detail of centre

The lower four compartments of the Vézelay tympanum show the nations that had already received the Gospels. They include the Byzantines, Armenians, and Ethiopians. The inclusion of the Byzantines is particularly important because it was the Byzantines who initially requested a Crusade to the holy land. The Byzantines had lost Jerusalem to the Seljuk Turks through warfare, and they were eager to seek western military support to reclaim that territory.

The characters in the lower Vézelay compartments are a direct contrast to their "heathen" counterparts in the lintel. They are human as opposed to monstrous. In the eyes of the designers, they had received God's grace and are thus pictured as fully human in every detail. These compartments can, therefore, can be seen as an allegory for the crusading nations. The Crusader armies were made up of many different nationalities bound only by faith in the same God. Nations that had previously warred with one another were suddenly united for a common goal. The lower tympanum compartments are an expression of this newfound solidarity.

=== Upper compartments ===
While the lower four compartments represent the Christian nations, the upper four compartments are a representation of the second mission of the Apostles. According to the Bible, "many wonders and signs were done by the apostles." These wonders included the healing of the sick and the casting out of demons and devils. These acts are represented in the upper four compartments of the Vézelay tympanum. In one compartment, a pair of lepers is shown with looks of astonishment as they compare limbs that have been miraculously healed. The demons are analogous to the non-Christians inhabiting the holy land. In reference to the Turkish take-over of the holy lands, Pope Urban said, "What a disgrace that a race so despicable, degenerate, and enslaved by demons should thus overcome a people endowed with faith in Almighty God!" It is not difficult to see the parallel between the Apostles' mission of casting out demons, and the designer's view of the crusaders' mission of casting out "a race ... enslaved by demons." It is further evidence of the Vézelay portal's peculiar political motives.

=== Central portal ===
The central portion of the Vézelay tympanum continues this process of politicizing religion. The central tympanum shows a benevolent Christ conveying his message to the Apostles, who flank him on either side. This Christ is distinct in Romanesque architecture. He is a stark contrast to the angry Christ of the St. Pierre de Moissac tympanum. The Moissac Christ is a forbidding figure that sits upon the throne of judgment. It is another example of the typical Romanesque Christ. His face is without caring or emotion. He holds the scrolls containing the deeds of mankind, and he stands ready to execute punishment on the damned. The Vézelay Christ, however, is pictured contraposto with arms wide. He is delivering a message, not exacting punishment. The Vézelay tympanum is remarkable because it is so different. The Vézelay Christ is sending the Crusaders out – he is not judging them. Indeed, the Crusaders were guaranteed remission of all sins if they participated in the Crusades. A forbidding Christ placed upon the throne of judgment would have been out of place at Vézelay. That is why the traditional Romanesque Christ, with its angry stare, was replaced at Vézelay by a kind and welcoming Christ with arms wide open.

== Astronomical alignment ==
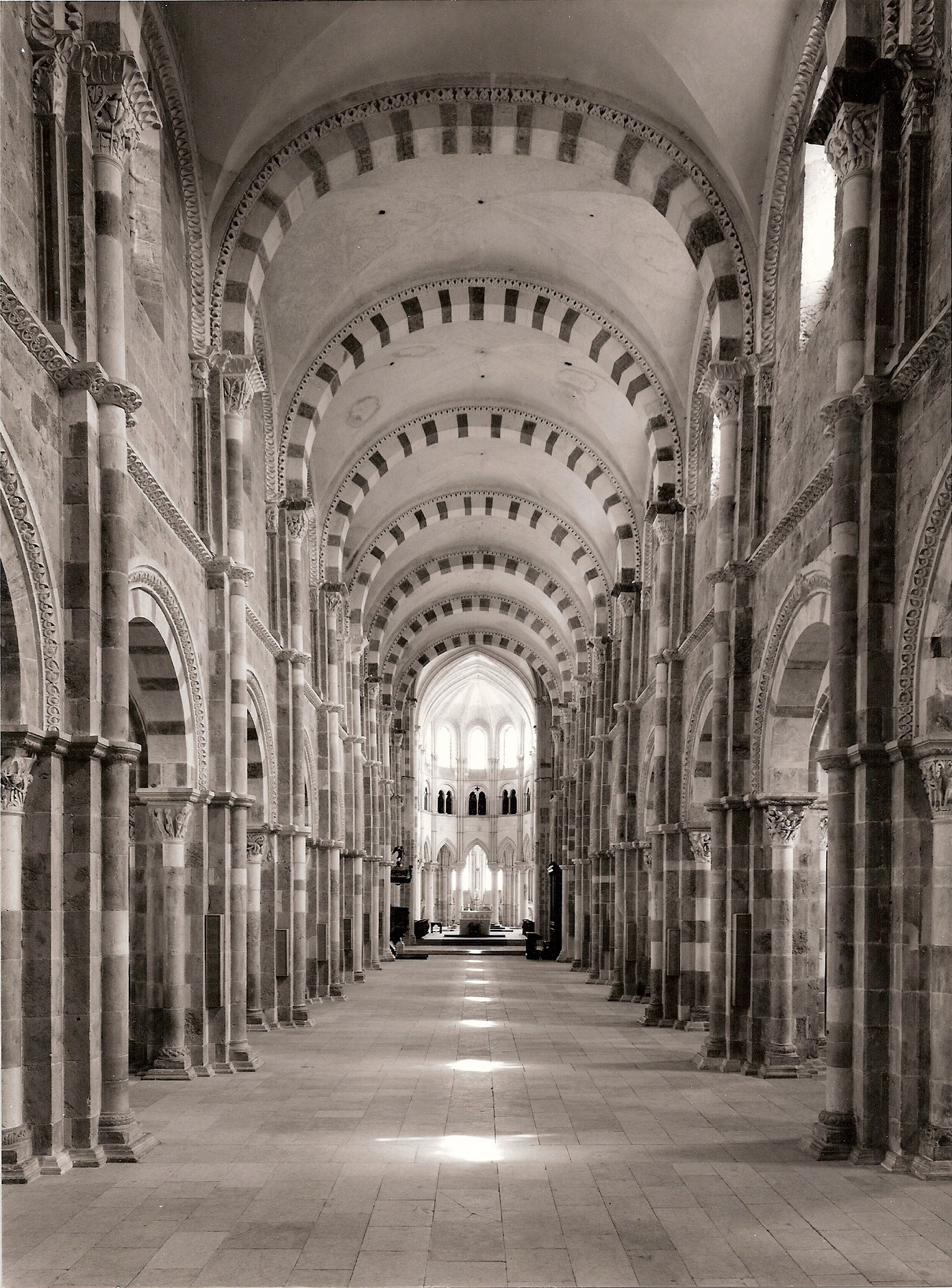
Looking east through nave on 23 June 1976, two days after the summer solstice

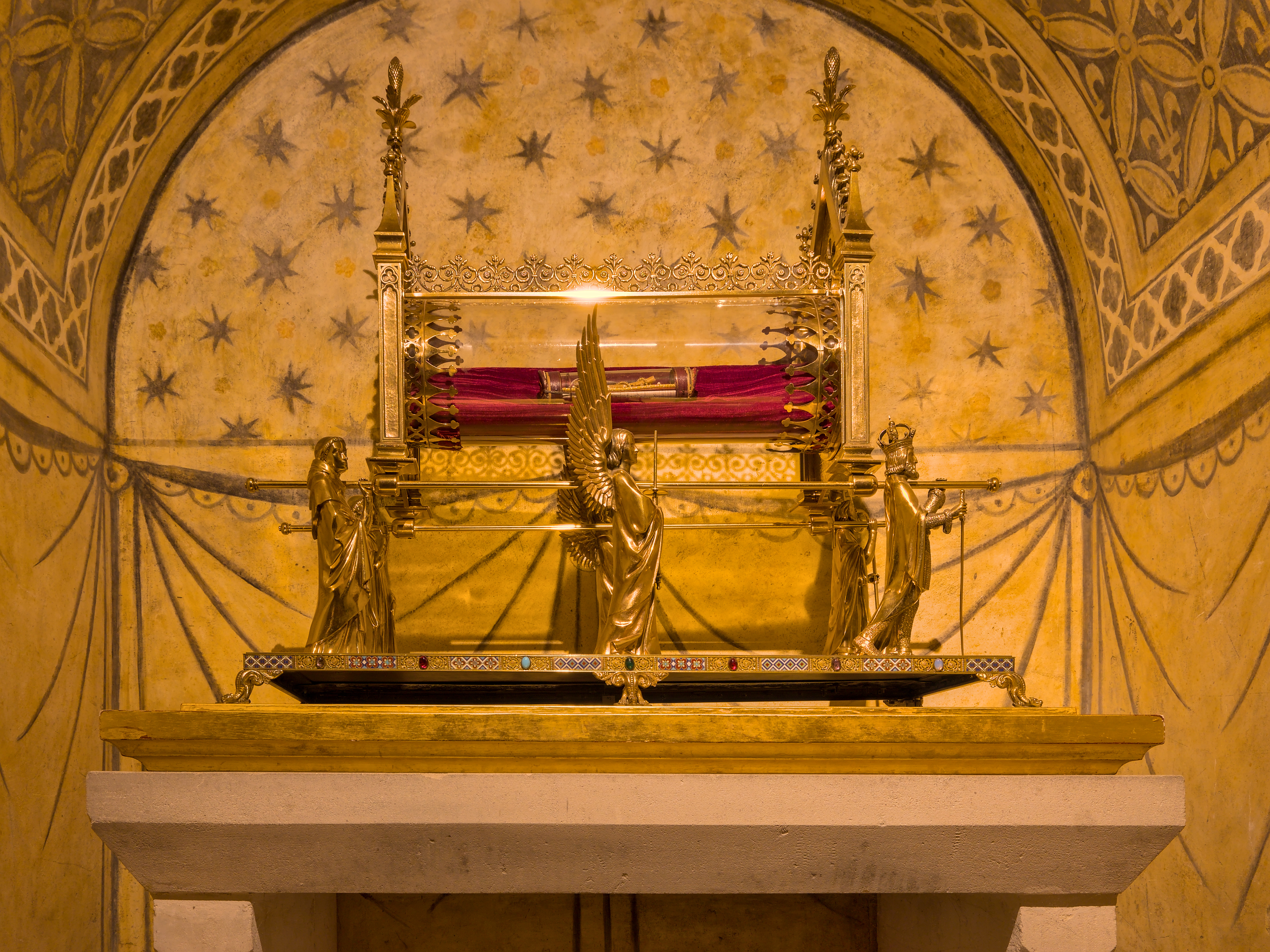
Mary Magdalene's relics in the crypt

In 1976, Hugues Delautre, one of the Franciscan fathers charged with stewardship of the Vézelay sanctuary, discovered that beyond the customary east-west orientation of the structure, the architecture of La Madeleine incorporates the relative positions of the Earth and the Sun into its design. Every June, just before the feast day of Saint John the Baptist, the astronomical dimensions of the church are revealed as the sun reaches its highest point of the year, at local noon on the summer solstice, when the sunlight coming through the southern clerestory windows casts a series of illuminated spots precisely along the longitudinal center of the nave floor.

== See also ==
- Commons:Great Romanesque tympanums in France
- List of World Heritage Sites in France
