= Louis Gassier =

French operatic baritone

Louis Gassier (30 April 1820 – 18 December 1871) was a French operatic baritone.

== Biography ==
Born in Saint-Maximin-la-Sainte-Baume (Var department), Gassier married the Spanish singer Josefa Gassier. He was hired with his wife in 1855 at Drury Lane in London, where they performed in La sonnambula and Il trovatore.

Gassier died in Havana on 18 December 1871.
