= Agricius of Trier =

First documented bishop of Trier

Saint Agricius
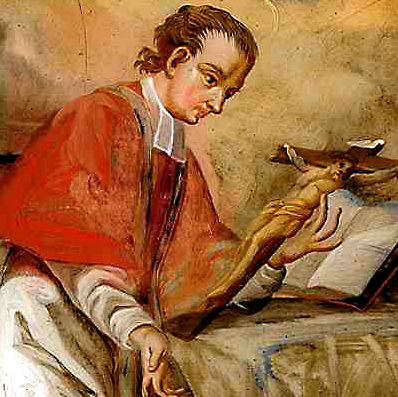
- Born: c. 260
- Died: 335
- Venerated in: Roman Catholic Church Eastern Orthodox Church
- Feast: January 19/13
- Patronage: Diocese of Trier

Saint Agricius, also Agritius (c. 260 – c. 335), was the first historically documented bishop of Trier.

== Background ==
From the time of Diocletian's reorganization of the divisions of the empire, Augusta Treverorum, now Trier, was the capital of Belgica Prima, the chief city of Gaul, and frequently the residence of the emperors. There were Christians among its population as early as the second century, and probably as early as the third century there was a bishop at Trier, which is the oldest episcopal see in Germany. The first clearly authenticated bishop is Agricius, who took part in the Council of Arles in 314.

== History ==
Little else is known about Agricius. There are stories about him, but these are based in part on Altmann's dubious Vita Helenae of about 850.

Agricius was born about the year 260, in Syria.

An 11th-century tradition states that he had been a priest of Antioch, and that he was moved to the See of Trier by Pope Sylvester I at the request of the Empress Helena. He was present at the Council of Arles in 314, where he signed the acts immediately after the presiding bishop of that diocese. This indicated that, at least in the fourth century, Trier laid claim to the primacy of Gaul and Germany, a claim his successor Saint Maximin reinforced. This story seems to have developed in order to promote the primacy of Trier over other sees in Gaul and Germany. "Saint Agritius laboured zealously and successfully during twenty years at the conversion of Gaul and of Western Germany."

Medieval tradition dates to Agricius' time the construction of the first cathedral in Trier, which was said to have been built over the Empress Helena's palace which she gave for that purpose. The Heiliger Rock (the "Holy Gown") is said to be the robe (the "seamless garment") which Jesus wore before His crucifixion and for which, according to the Gospel of St. John, the Roman soldiers cast lots. Part of this robe is said to have been found by Helena, mother of Constantine the Great, who gave it to Agricius.

Saint Athanasius, who came as an exile to Trier in 335 or 336, speaks of the large numbers of faithful whom he found there and the number of churches in the course of being built. The famous relics of Trier - the above-named "Heiliger Rock", the Nail of the True Cross, and the body of Matthias the Apostle - are all said to have been brought there by Agricius.

== Notes ==
Titles of the Great Christian Church
Preceded by Maternus	Bishop of Trier; 327 – 335	Succeeded by Saint Maximinus
