= Celidonius =

Traditional name of a figure in the Bible

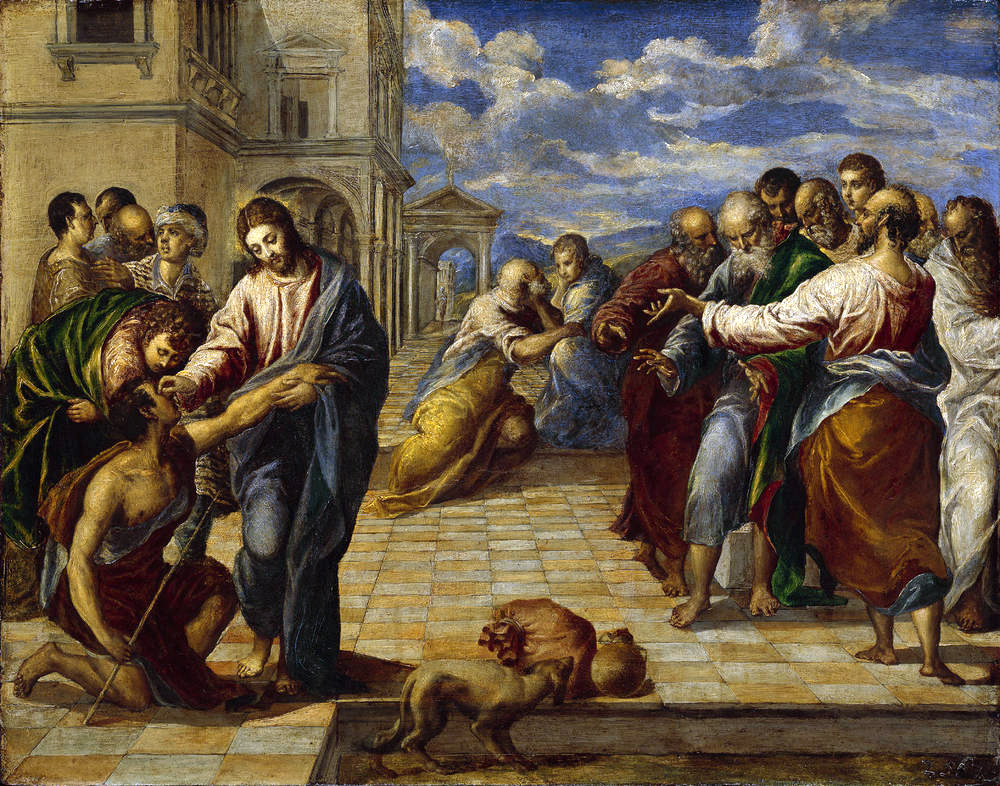
Healing the Man Born Blind by El Greco, ca. 1570 (Staatliche Kunstsammlungen, Dresden).

Celidonius (Ancient Greek: Χελιδόνιος, romanized: Khelidónios) is the traditional name ascribed to the man born blind whom Jesus healed in the Gospel of John 9:1–38. This tradition is attested in both Eastern Christianity and in Catholicism.

One tradition ascribes to St. Celidonius the founding of the Christian church at Nîmes in Gaul (present-day France). For this reason, he is often confused with Sidonius of Aix.

Saint Demetrius of Rostov, in his Great Synaxarion, also mentions that the blind man's name was Celidonius.

In the Eastern Orthodox Church, the account of the healing of Celidonius is recounted on the "Sunday of the Blind Man", the Sixth Sunday of Pascha (Easter). Many hymns concerning the healing and its significance are found in the Pentecostarion, a liturgical book used during the Paschal season.

== See also ==
- List of names for the Biblical nameless
