= Saint-Maximin-la-Sainte-Baume =

- Commune
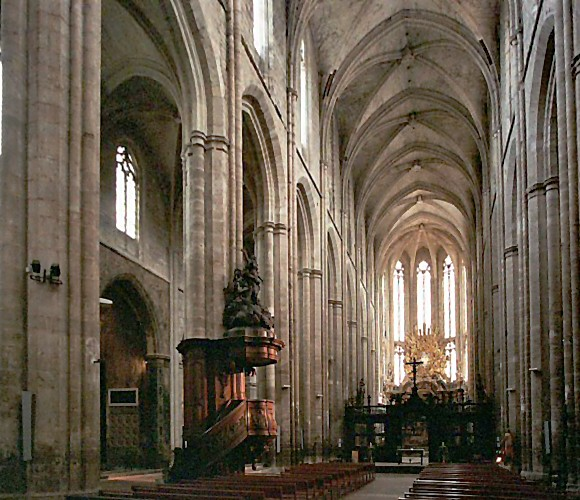
- Basilica of Mary Magdalene, begun 1295.

- Coat of arms
- Location of Saint-Maximin-la-Sainte-Baume
- Location within France Location within Provence-Alpes-Côte d'Azur
- Coordinates: 43°27′12″N 5°51′41″E
- Country: France
- Region: Provence-Alpes-Côte d'Azur
- Department: Var
- Arrondissement: Brignoles
- Canton: Saint-Maximin-la-Sainte-Baume
- Intercommunality: CA Provence Verte

Government
  - Mayor (2020–2026): Alain Decanis
- Area^{1}: 64.13 km^{2} (24.76 sq mi)
- Elevation: 520 m (1,710 ft)
- Highest elevation: 778 m (2,552 ft)
- Lowest elevation: 261 m (856 ft)
- Population (2023): 17,896
  - Density: 279.1/km^{2} (722.8/sq mi)
- Time zone: UTC+01:00 (CET)
  - Summer (DST): UTC+02:00 (CEST)
- INSEE/Postal code: 83116 /83470
- ^{1} French Land Register data, which excludes lakes, ponds, glaciers > 1 km^{2} (0.386 sq mi or 247 acres) and river estuaries.

Saint-Maximin-la-Sainte-Baume (French pronunciation: [sɛ̃ maksimɛ̃ la sɛ̃t bom]; Occitan: Sant Maissemin de la Santa Bauma) is a commune in the southeastern French department of Var, in the Provence-Alpes-Côte d'Azur region. Located 40 km (25 mi) east of Aix-en-Provence, the town lies at the foot of the Sainte-Baume mountains. Baume or bama is the Provençal equivalent of cave. The town's basilica is dedicated to Mary Magdalene.

== History ==
The Roman Villa Lata, remains of which have been identified beneath Place Malherbe in the centre of the town, was one among numerous agricultural working Roman villas in the plain that was traversed by the via Aurelia. The Abbey of Saint Victor at Marseille had dependencies in the neighborhood: Saint-Maximin, Saint-Jean, Saint-Mitre, Sainte-Marie. The Romanesque parish church dedicated to Saint Maximin of Trier was demolished in the final stages of constructing the basilica.

In the 12th century, Berenguer Ramon I, Count of Provence, established Saint-Maximin as a town uniquely under his care. In 1246, following the death of Raymond IV Berenger, Provence passed through his younger daughter to Charles d'Anjou, brother of Louis IX of France and sometime king of Sicily. The tenuous Anjou presence at Saint-Maximin was fiercely contested by the seigneurs of Baux among other local leaders.

The French baritone Louis Gassier (1820–1871) was born in Saint-Maximin-la-Sainte-Baume.

== The cultus of Mary Magdalene ==
The little town was transformed by the well-published discovery on 12 December 1279, in the crypt of Saint-Maximin, of a sarcophagus that was proclaimed to be the tomb of Mary Magdalene, signaled by miracles and by the ensuing pilgrim-drawing cult of Mary Magdalene and Saint Maximin, that was assiduously cultivated by Charles II of Anjou, King of Naples. He founded the massive Gothic Basilica of St. Mary Magdalene in 1295 with the blessing of Boniface VIII, who placed it under the new teaching order of Dominicans.

The founding tradition held that relics of Mary Magdalene were preserved here, and not at Vézelay, and that she, her brother Lazarus, and a certain Maximinus fled the Holy Land by a miraculous boat with neither rudder nor sail and landed at Saintes-Maries-de-la-Mer, in the Camargue near Arles. Maximinus is venerated as St Maximin, a name shared by the 3rd-century Maximin of Trier and the 1st-century martyr, Maximinus of Aix, whom medieval legend conflated with the later Maximin; the conflated Maximin was added in the discussed medieval period to earlier lists of the Seventy Disciples.

After landing in the Camargue, Mary Magdalene came to Marseille and converted the local people. Later in life, according to the founding legend, she retired to a cave in the Sainte-Baume mountains. She was buried in Saint-Maximin, which was not a place of pilgrimage in early times, though there is a Gallo-Roman crypt under the basilica. Sarcophagi are shown, of St Maximin, Ste. Marcella, Ste. Suzanne and St. Sidoine (Sidonius) as well as the reliquary, which is said to hold the remains of Mary Magdalene. Genetic testing of some of the hairs in the reliquary confirmed that it was the hair of a woman of possible Jewish ancestry, but do not confirm the identity of the source of the hair.

Construction of the basilica began in 1295. The crypt was complete when the church was consecrated in 1316. In it were installed a fourth-century Gallo-Roman funerary monument and four marble sarcophagi, whose bas-reliefs permit a Christian identification.

The Black Death in 1348, which killed half the local population, interrupted the building campaign. It was not taken up again until 1404, and the sixth bay of the nave complete by 1412. Work continued until 1532, when it was decided to leave the basilica without a finished west front or portal or bell towers, features that it lacks to this day. The plan has a main apse flanked by two subsidiary apses. Its great aisled nave is without transept. The nave is flanked by sixteen chapels in the side-aisles.

== Geography ==
=== Climate ===
Saint-Maximin-la-Sainte-Baume has a hot-summer Mediterranean climate (Köppen climate classification Csa). The average annual temperature in Saint-Maximin-la-Sainte-Baume is 13.7 °C (56.7 °F). The average annual rainfall is 765.3 mm (30.13 in) with November as the wettest month. The temperatures are highest on average in July, at around 23.0 °C (73.4 °F), and lowest in January, at around 5.9 °C (42.6 °F). The highest temperature ever recorded in Saint-Maximin-la-Sainte-Baume was 42.5 °C (108.5 °F) on 28 June 2019; the coldest temperature ever recorded was −15.2 °C (4.6 °F) on 12 February 2012.

Climate data for Saint-Maximin-la-Sainte-Baume (1991−2020 normals, extremes 2006−present)
Month	Jan	Feb	Mar	Apr	May	Jun	Jul	Aug	Sep	Oct	Nov	Dec	Year
Record high °C (°F)	23.1 (73.6)	22.6 (72.7)	25.6 (78.1)	29.4 (84.9)	33.5 (92.3)	42.5 (108.5)	39.6 (103.3)	40.0 (104.0)	33.7 (92.7)	31.0 (87.8)	22.6 (72.7)	23.2 (73.8)	42.5 (108.5)
Mean daily maximum °C (°F)	11.3 (52.3)	12.4 (54.3)	15.8 (60.4)	19.5 (67.1)	23.2 (73.8)	28.2 (82.8)	31.6 (88.9)	31.0 (87.8)	26.4 (79.5)	21.1 (70.0)	15.2 (59.4)	11.9 (53.4)	20.6 (69.1)
Daily mean °C (°F)	5.9 (42.6)	6.3 (43.3)	9.1 (48.4)	12.4 (54.3)	15.9 (60.6)	20.2 (68.4)	23.0 (73.4)	22.3 (72.1)	18.6 (65.5)	14.5 (58.1)	9.7 (49.5)	6.4 (43.5)	13.7 (56.7)
Mean daily minimum °C (°F)	0.4 (32.7)	0.2 (32.4)	2.4 (36.3)	5.2 (41.4)	8.6 (47.5)	12.2 (54.0)	14.4 (57.9)	13.7 (56.7)	10.8 (51.4)	7.9 (46.2)	4.2 (39.6)	0.9 (33.6)	6.7 (44.1)
Record low °C (°F)	−10.4 (13.3)	−15.2 (4.6)	−7.6 (18.3)	−7.0 (19.4)	−0.7 (30.7)	3.4 (38.1)	6.6 (43.9)	5.0 (41.0)	0.9 (33.6)	−3.9 (25.0)	−8.6 (16.5)	−9.7 (14.5)	−15.2 (4.6)
Average precipitation mm (inches)	62.3 (2.45)	49.6 (1.95)	57.7 (2.27)	66.5 (2.62)	70.8 (2.79)	47.8 (1.88)	21.5 (0.85)	28.8 (1.13)	59.5 (2.34)	101.0 (3.98)	130.6 (5.14)	69.2 (2.72)	765.3 (30.13)
Average precipitation days (≥ 1.0 mm)	6.4	6.7	6.4	7.7	6.9	4.7	2.5	2.7	4.2	6.1	8.0	6.5	68.7
Source: Météo-France

== Gallery ==
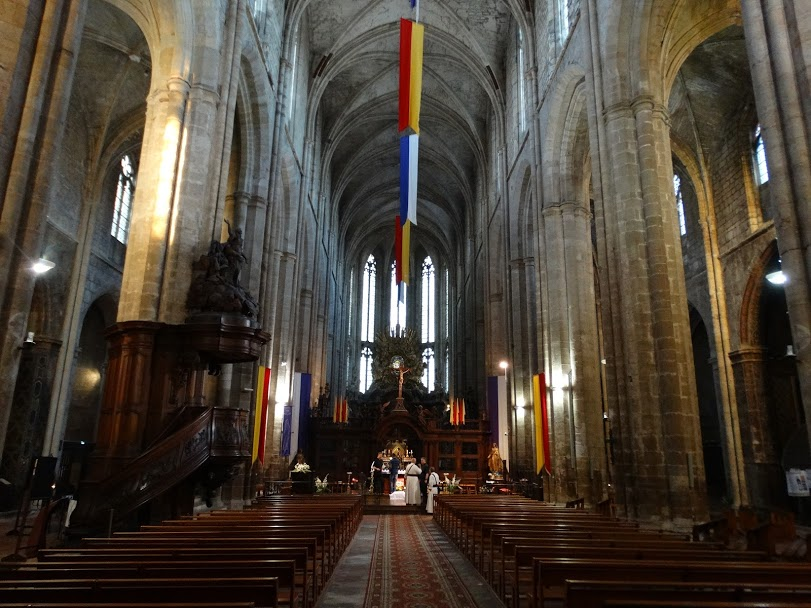
Basilica: interior

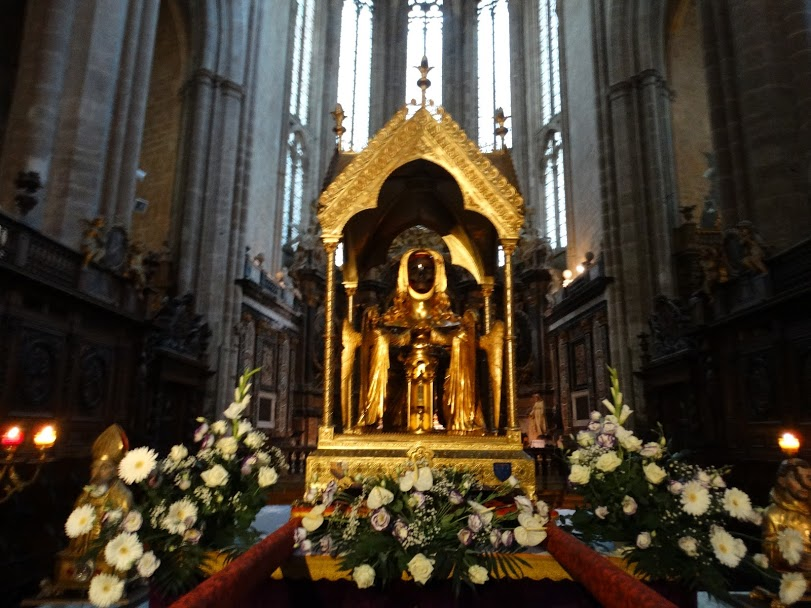
Basilica: altar

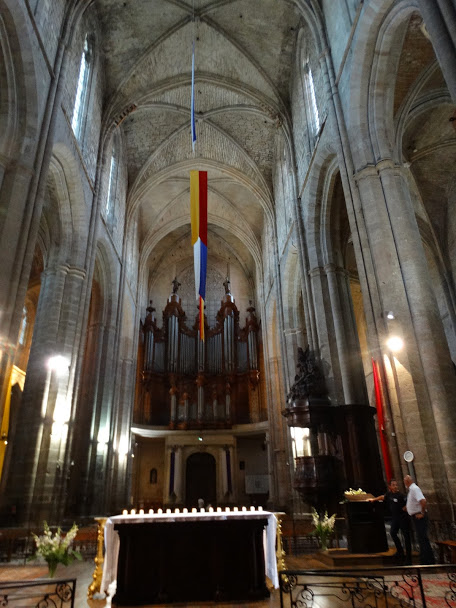
Basilica: organ

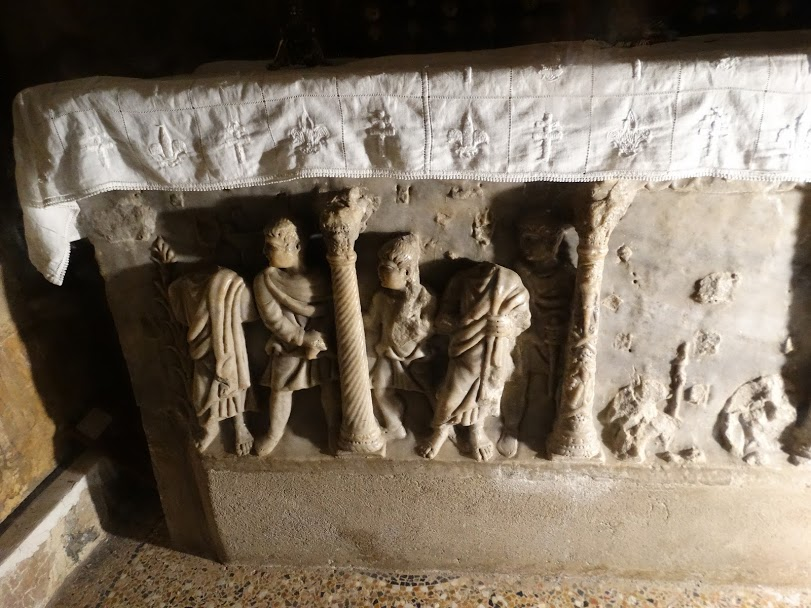
Basilica: Sarcophagus of the Holy Innocents (4th century)

== Population ==
Historical population
Year	Pop.	±% p.a.
1968	3,180	—
1975	4,013	+3.38%
1982	5,511	+4.64%
1990	9,594	+7.18%
1999	12,402	+2.89%
2007	14,142	+1.65%
2012	14,734	+0.82%
2017	16,433	+2.21%
2023	17,896	+1.43%
Source: INSEE

== Notable people from Saint-Maximin la Sainte-Beaume ==
- Marvin Klein (born 1999), French racing driver, 2021 and 2022 Porsche Carrera Cup France champion

== Administration ==
List of mayors of Saint-Maximin-la-Sainte-Baume (partial):

2020–present: Alain Decanis
2017–2020: Horace Lanfranchi
2014–2017: Christine Lanfranchi-Dorgal (UMP)
2008–2014: Alain Penal (UMP)
2001–2008: Gabriel Rinaudo (RPR)
1995–2001: Horace Lanfranchi (RPR)
