= A Statue of Ceres =

Painting by Peter Paul Rubens

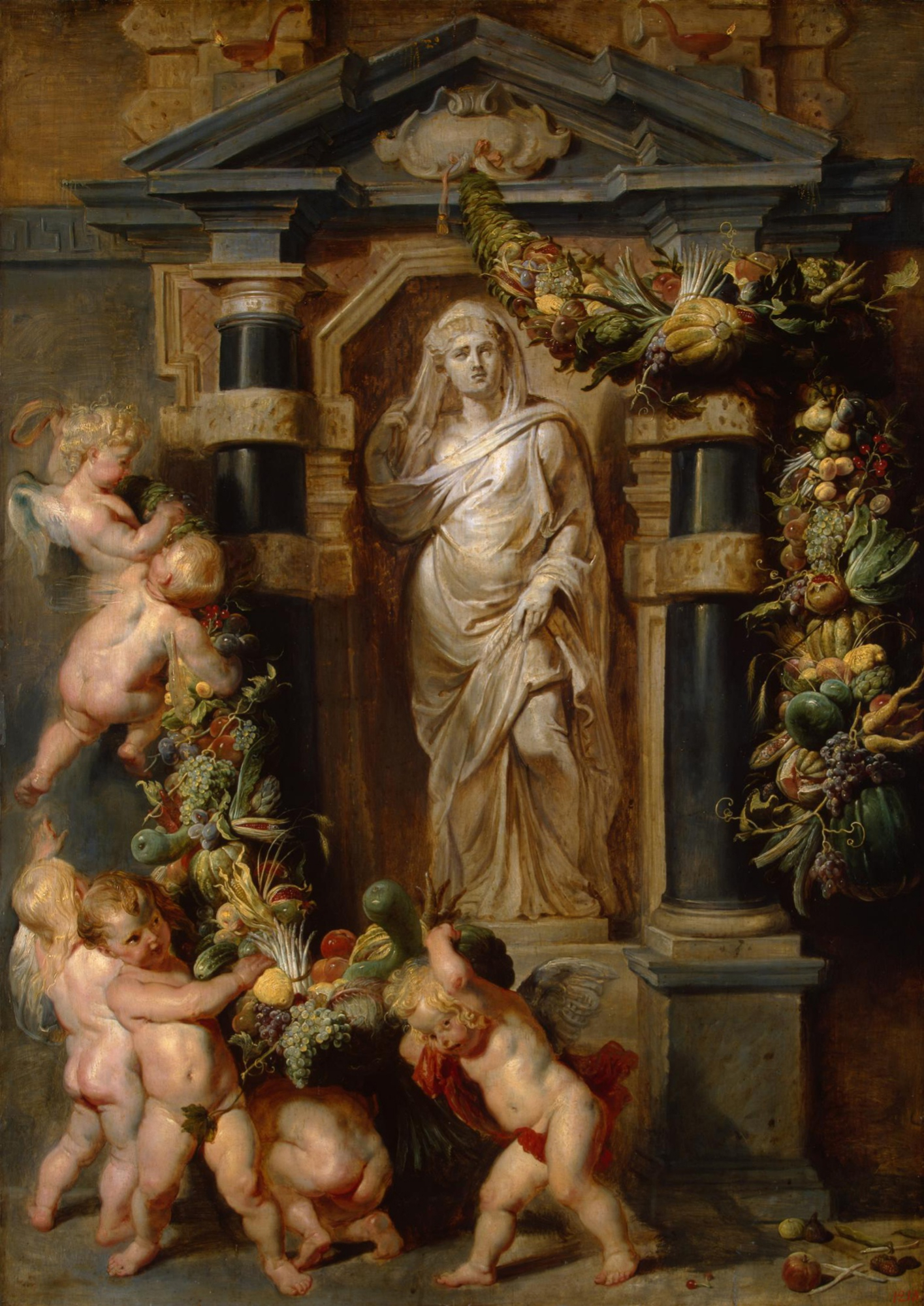
A Statue of Ceres (c. 1615) by Peter Paul Rubens

A Statue of Ceres is an oil on oak panel by Peter Paul Rubens, created c. 1615. It shows putti offering garlands to a statue of the Roman fertility goddess Ceres. It is held in the Hermitage Museum, in St Petersburg.

It was sold in The Hague for 1210 guilders in 1760 and eight years later was acquired in Brussels for the Hermitage from Carl de Coben's collection.
