= Healing of the Man Born Blind (El Greco, Dresden) =

Painting by El Greco

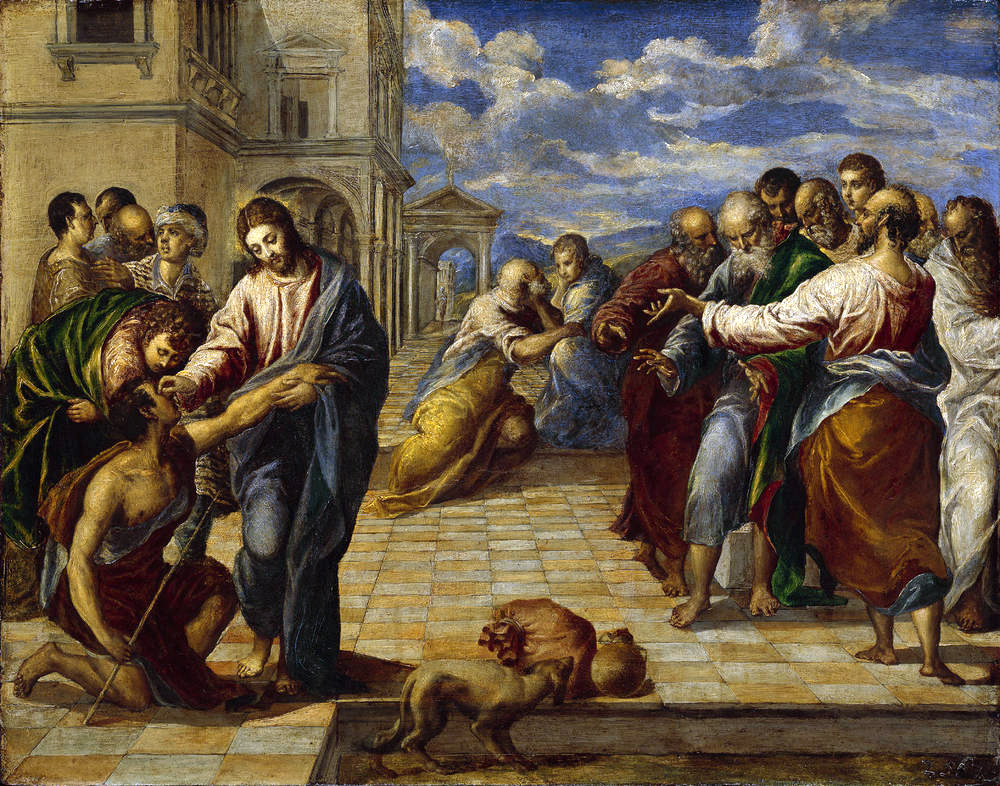
- Artist: El Greco
- Year: 1567
- Medium: oil on canvas
- Dimensions: 65.5 cm × 84 cm (25.8 in × 33 in)
- Location: Gemäldegalerie Alte Meister, Dresden

Healing of the Man Born Blind is a painting of the healing of the man born blind by the Greek painter El Greco, produced in 1567 during his time in Venice. It is now in the Palazzo della Pilotta in Parma, Italy.

It marks his first use of a space marked by perspective, abandoning the perspective-less Byzantine style in which he had been trained. It shows the marked influence of the Venetian painters Tintoretto, Titian and Veronese. El Greco returned to the subject five years later, in a work now in Parma.

== See also ==
- List of works by El Greco

== Bibliography ==
- Álvarez Lopera, José, El Greco, Madrid, Arlanza, 2005, Biblioteca «Descubrir el Arte», (colección «Grandes maestros»). ISBN 84-95503-44-1.
- Scholz-Hänsel, Michael, El Greco, Colonia, Taschen, 2003. ISBN 978-3-8228-3173-1.
- https://web.archive.org/web/20101129094512/http://www.artehistoria.jcyl.es/genios/cuadros/6301.htm
