= Giulio Bruni =

Italian painter

Giulio Bruni (died 1615) was an Italian painter of the late-Renaissance period.

Born in the Piedmontese, he trained mainly in Genoa, first under Lazzaro Tavarone, then under Giovanni Battista Paggi, and remained painting in Genoa, until he was expelled by war. He painted a St. Thomas of Villanova giving alms for the church of San Giacomo. He had a brother, Giovanni Batista, also a painter.
