= Sidonius of Aix =

French archbishop

Saint Sidonius of Aix
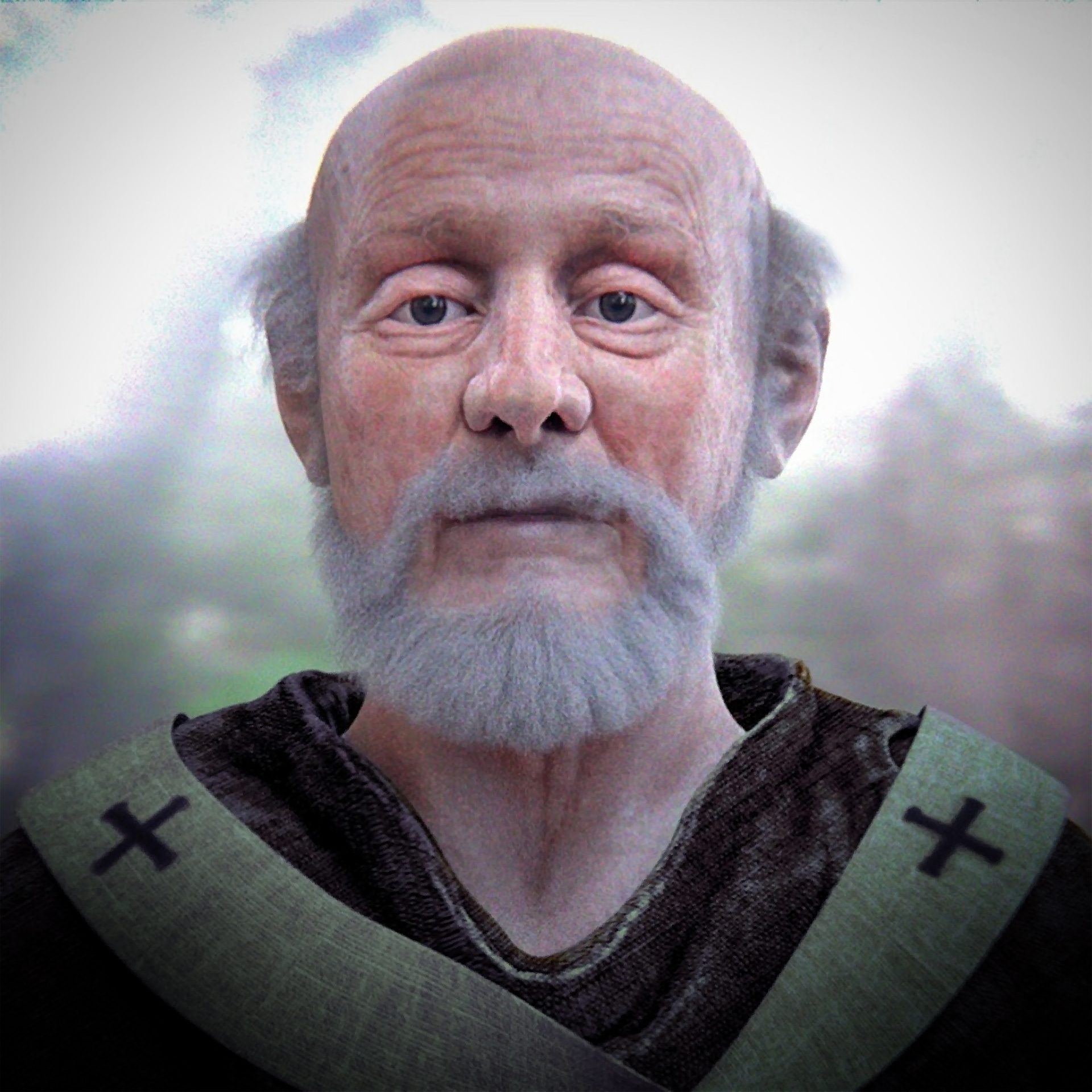
- Forensically reconstructed image from Sidonius' relics
- Born: Sidon
- Died: c. 80 AD; Aix-en-Provence
- Venerated in: Roman Catholic Church; Eastern Orthodox Church
- Canonized: Pre-Congregational Saint
- Major shrine: Aix-en-Provence, Saint-Paul-Trois-Châteaux, Saint-Restitut
- Feast: 23 August, 7 November
- Attributes: Receiving sight from Jesus
- Patronage: Aix-en-Provence
- Controversy: Possible conflation of saints, possibly dated incorrectly

St. Sidonius (also called Cedonius, or Restitutus) is traditionally held to be St. Maximinus of Aix's successor as Archbishop of Aix. He is also traditionally held to be a blind man healed by Jesus. The incident is often held to be Jesus healing the man blind from birth in John 9, but the man healed in this incident is more commonly associated with St. Celidonius, Protobishop of Nîmes. The name Sidonius literally means "from Sidon", so he could have been part of the Syro-Phoenician crowd that followed Jesus in Matthew 15:21 and Mark 7:24.

== Veneration ==
He was said to have followed The Three Marys, St. Lazarus of Bethany and Maximinus into Gaul. Sidonius was closely associated with Maximinus, who was said to be one of the Seventy-two Apostles. Sidonius became the first bishop of Saint-Paul-Trois-Châteaux until the death of Maximinus, whereupon he succeeded him as Archbishop of Aix. He is also connected with the commune of Saint-Restitut. When he died, he was buried in the same crypt as St. Maximinus. His relics were unceremoniously stored away in 20th Century and were rediscovered recently along with Dominican documents proving their authenticity.

Although they are almost always conflated, St. Restitutus may be a different saint. The feast of St. Restitutus is held on 7 November, whereas the feast of Sidonius of Aix is held on 23 August. In addition, the relics of St. Restitutus were said to be moved to Orléans, whereas the relics of Sidonius are known to be in Aix. Nevertheless, the name Restitutus means 'the Restored One' (which likely refers to the saint's healing at the hands of Jesus) so it is possible that Restitutus is a nickname and the two names refer to the one person.

Traditionally, he is said to have lived in the First Century, but recent models for the Christianisation of Gaul lead some historians to believe that he should be dated to the Fourth Century.

== Notes ==
Titles of the Great Christian Church
Preceded by Maximinus	Archbishop of Aix; After 40AD – c.80AD	Succeeded by Triferius
