= Zha Shibiao =

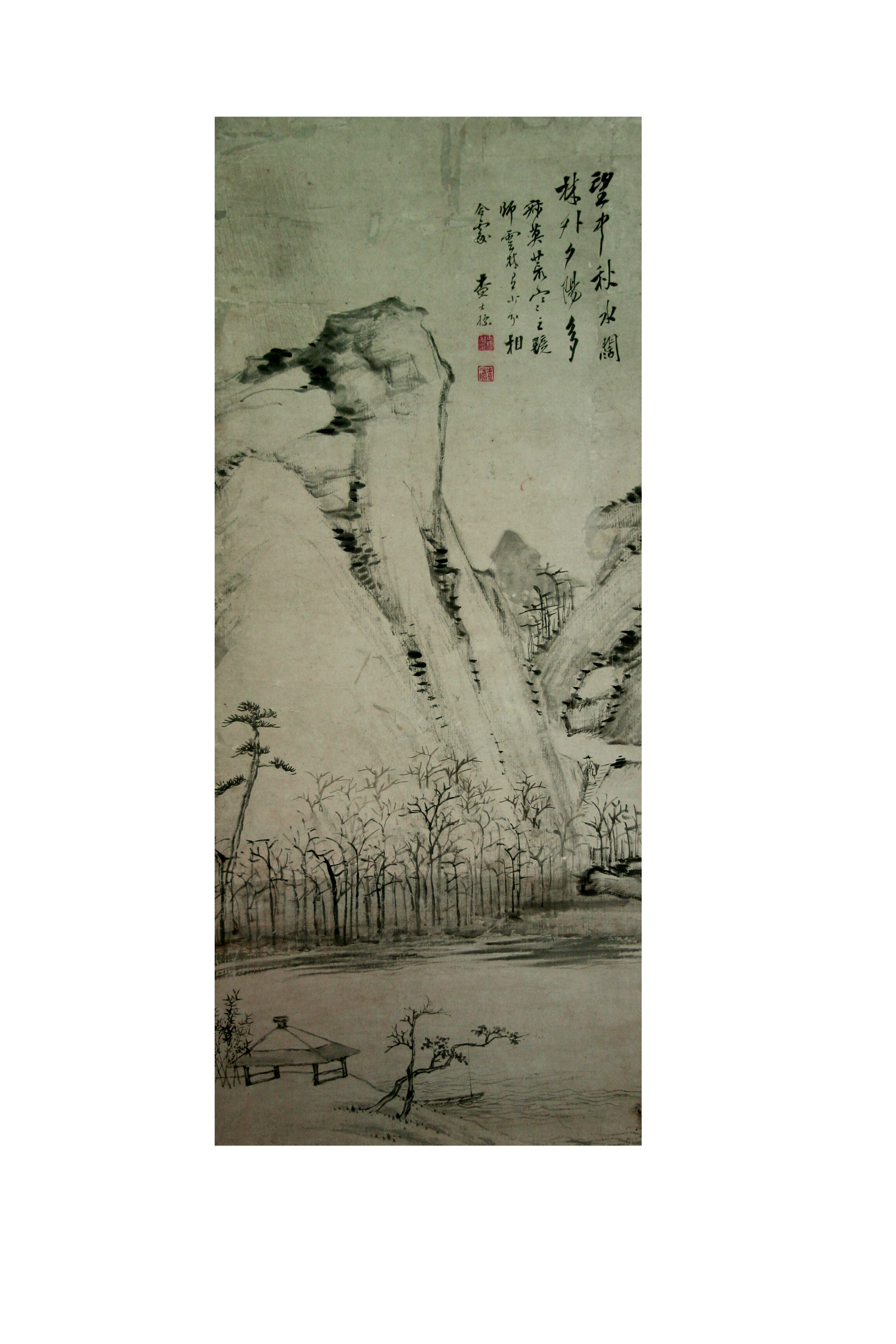
Nantoyōsō Collection, Japan

Zha Shibiao or Cha Shih-piao (Chinese: 查士标; 1615 – 1698) was a Chinese calligrapher and landscape painter from Anhui. He was affiliated with the Anhui School, also known as the Xin'an School, which is noted for dry brushstrokes and sparse compositions. His family, and himself, were art collectors and Ming dynasty aristocrats. He had studied for the civil service exam under the Ming and received the xiucai degree in his twenties. However he abandoned any attempt at an official career after the Manchu conquest. Subsequent to the 1670s he moved, or fled, depending on the source, to Yangzhou. As a calligrapher he was influenced by Dong Qichang and Mi Fu. His landscapes were more influenced by Hong Ren and Ni Zan. His later works are considered to have had a more moist and expressive feel than those of Hong Ren. As a person he was said to be easy-going, but slightly reclusive. He also had a fondness for drink, indulging into the late hours.

== Sources ==
- Chinese Paintings in the Ashmolean Museum Oxford (182) Oxford ISBN 1-85444-132-9
- Hong Kong Museum of art page
- Huangshan site
