= Christ Healing the Blind (Champaigne) =

Painting by Philippe de Champaigne

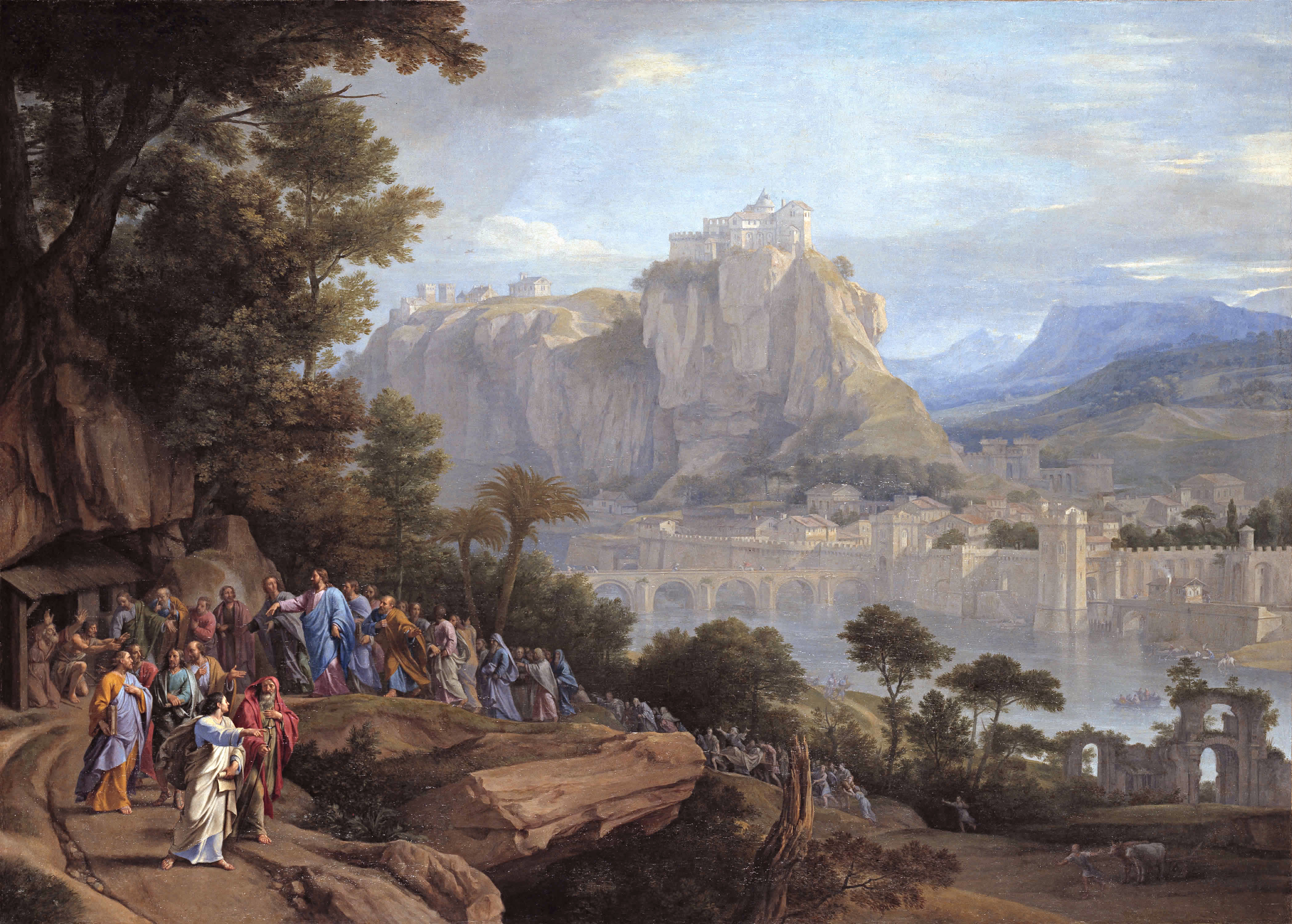
- Artist: Philippe de Champaigne
- Year: c. 1655–1660
- Medium: oil on canvas
- Dimensions: 102.2 x cm × 141.9 cm ( × 55.9 in)
- Location: Timken Museum of Art, San Diego, California

Christ Healing the Blind is an oil on canvas painting by Philippe de Champaigne, painted from c. 1655 to 1660. It is held at the Timken Museum of Art, in San Diego. It portrays a miracle of Jesus, having as a background a landscape featuring a river, a bridge, a walled city, and a castle on top of a mountain.
