= 1620 in art =

Events from the year 1620 in art.

== Events ==
- Anthony van Dyck, at the instigation of George Villiers, Marquess of Buckingham, visits England for the first time where he spends about four months and works for King James. In London, in the collection of the Earl of Arundel, he first sees the work of Titian.

== Works ==
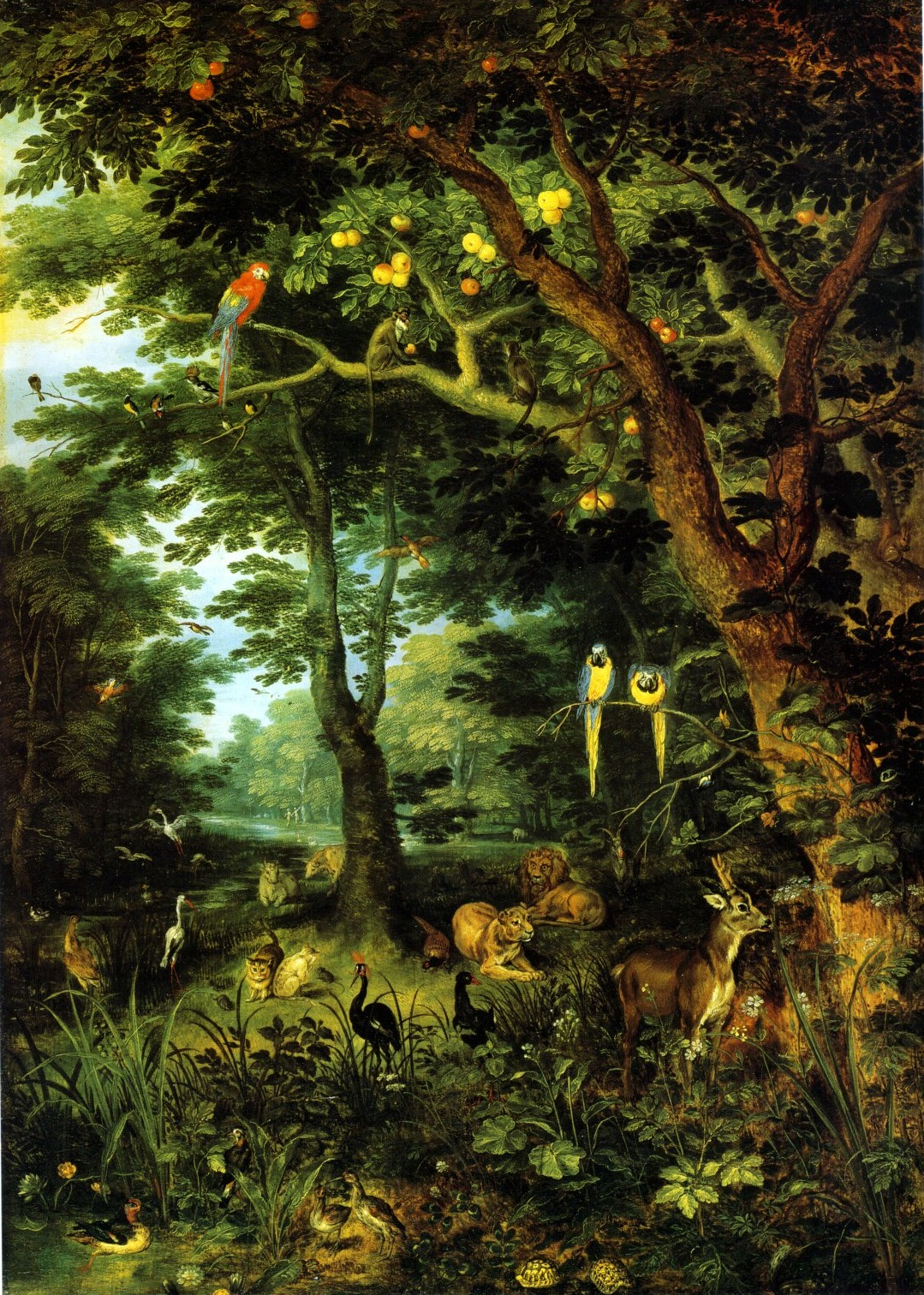
Brueghel, Paradise

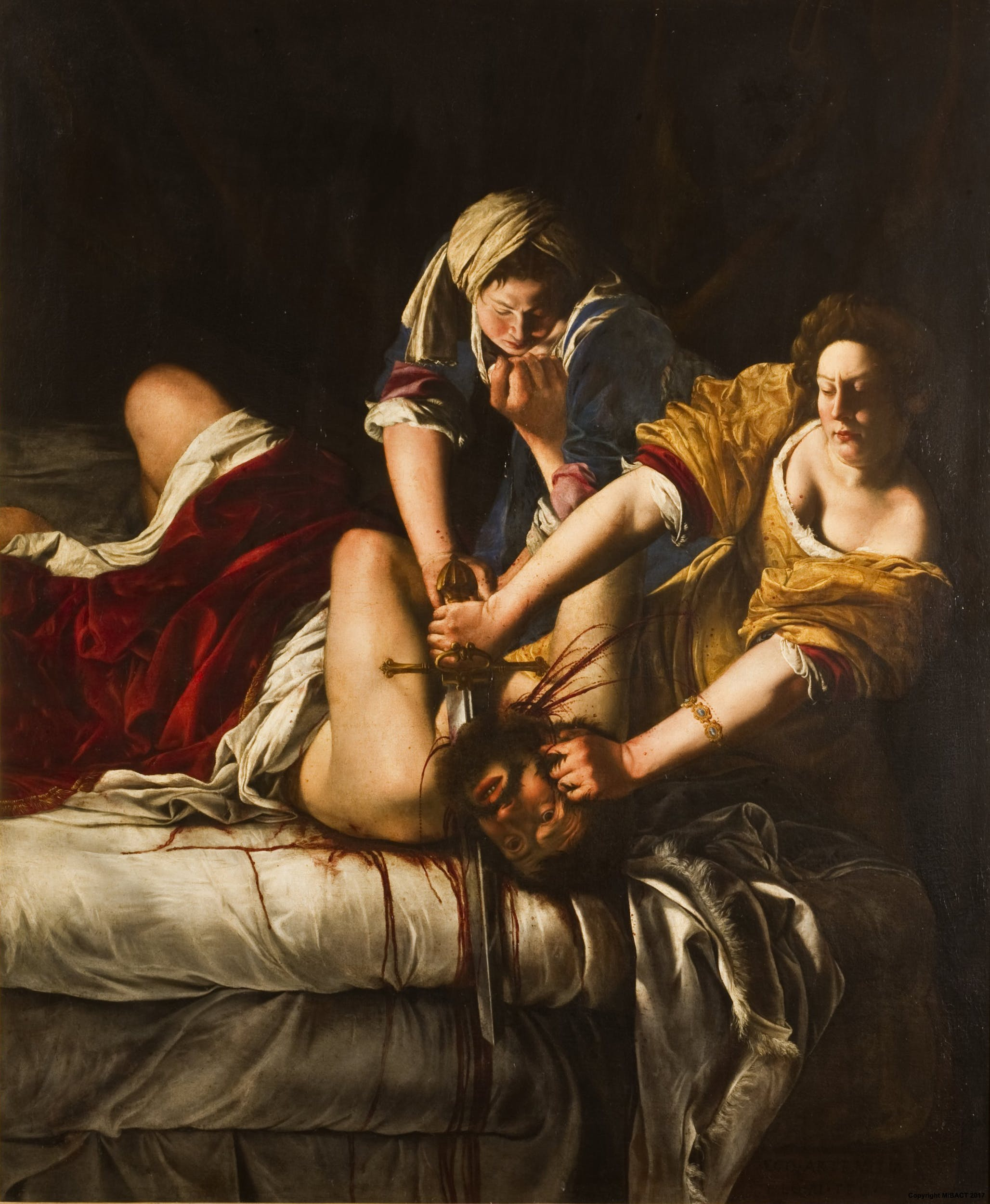
Gentileschi, Judith Decapitating Holofernes

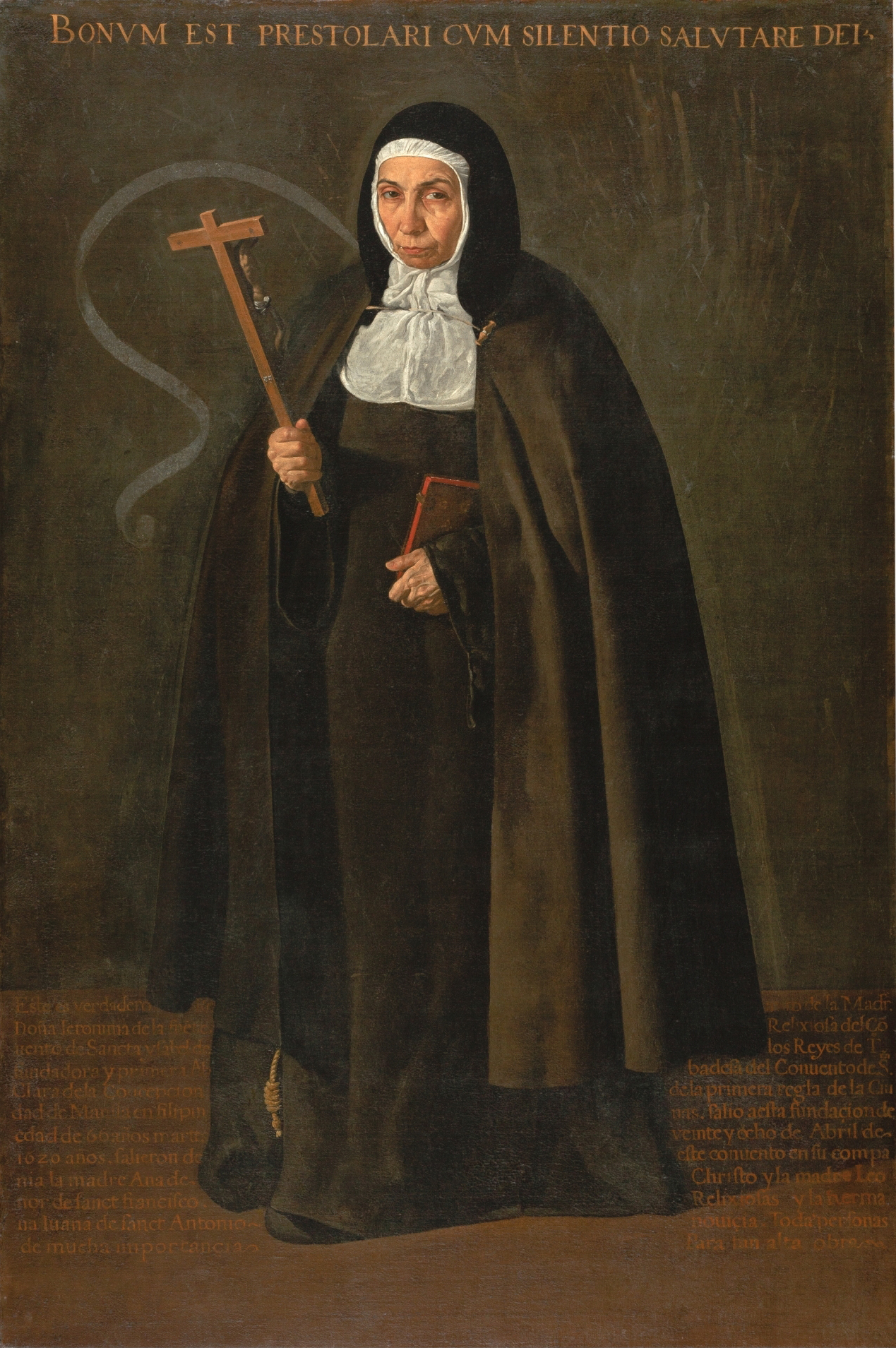
Velázquez, The Nun Jerónima de la Fuente
- Jan Brueghel the Younger - Paradise
- Willem Pieterszoon Buytewech - Merry Company (approximate date)
- Cecco del Caravaggio - Resurrection
- Claude Deruet
  - Road to Calvary
  - The Triumph of the Amazons
- Artemisia Gentileschi - Judith Decapitating Holofernes (Uffizi, Florence)
- Orazio Gentileschi - Judith and Holofernes
- Marcus Gheeraerts the Younger
  - Margaret Laton (approximate date)
  - Portrait of a woman in red (Tate Britain, London)
- Jacob Jordaens - The Satyr and the Farmer's Family
- Judith Leyster - Jester with a Lute
- Nicholas Stone - Tomb of Elizabeth Carey (St. Michael's, Church Stowe, England)
- Anthony van Dyck
  - The Apostle Judas Thaddaeus (c.1619-21; Kunsthistorisches Museum, Vienna)
  - [[The Continence of Scipio]] (c.1620-21; Christ Church Picture Gallery, Oxford)
  - The Betrayal of Christ (c.1618-20; Bristol Museum and Art Gallery)
  - The Betrayal of Christ (c.1620; Minneapolis Institute of Art)
  - The Betrayal of Christ (c.1620; Prado Museum)
- Gerard van Honthorst - The Adoration of the shepherds (destroyed)
- Diego Velázquez - The Nun Jerónima de la Fuente

== Births ==
- January 17 - Anton Janson, Dutch typographer and printmaker (died 1687)
- April 21 - Salvatore Castiglione, Italian painter of landscapes and pastoral subjects (died 1676)
- May 23 - Pieter Neeffs II, Flemish Baroque painter who specialized in architectural interiors of churches (died 1675)
- October 1 - Nicolaes Pietersz. Berchem, Dutch painter of pastoral landscapes (died 1683)
- October 16 - Pierre Paul Puget, French painter, sculptor, architect and engineer (died 1694)
- October 20 - Aelbert Cuyp, Dutch landscape painter (died 1691)
- date unknown
  - Clemente Bocciardo, Italian painter (died 1658)
  - Giovanni Battista Bonacina, Italian painter and engraver of the Baroque period (died unknown)
  - Domenico Maria Canuti, Italian painter active mainly in Bologna and Rome (died 1660)
  - Theresa Maria Coriolano, Italian engraver of the Baroque period (died 1671)
  - Juan de Zurbarán, Spanish Baroque painter (died 1649)
  - Cosimo Fancelli, Italian sculptor (died 1688)
  - Jan Goedart, Dutch painter famous for his illustrations of insects (died 1668)
  - Bendix Grodtschilling, Danish painter and carpenter (died 1690)
  - Nicolas Jarry, French calligrapher (died 1674)
  - Louis Lerambert, French sculptor from family of artists (died 1670)
  - Andrea Giacomo Podesta, Italian engraver and painter (died after 1640)
  - Santo Rinaldi, Italian painter of battle scenes, landscapes, and vedute (died 1676)
  - Flaminio Torre, Italian painter of churches in Bologna (died 1661)
- probable
  - Abraham van Beijeren, Dutch painter (died 1690)
  - Giovanni Battista Bonacina, Italian painter and engraver (died unknown)
  - Frederik Bouttats the Younger, Flemish engraver (died 1661)
  - Giovanni Battista Cavazza, Italian painter and engraver (died unknown)
  - Willem Eversdijck, Dutch portrait painter (died 1671)
  - Albert Flamen, Dutch engraver (died 1669)
  - Gury Nikitin, was a Russian painter and iconographer (died 1691)
  - Antonio Maria Vassallo, Italian painter of mythologic scenes and still-lifes (died 1664/1673)

== Deaths ==
- June 16 - Carlo Saraceni, Italian painter of landscapes, cabinet paintings, and altarpieces (born 1579)
- September - Aart van Antum, marine painter (born 1580)
- October 28 - Scarsellino, Italian Mannerist painter of the School of Ferrara (born 1550/1551)
- date unknown
  - Abel Grimmer, Flemish painter (born 1570)
  - Antonio Viviani, Italian painter of frescoes (born 1560)
  - Wu Bin, Chinese landscape painter during the Ming dynasty (born 1573)
- probable
  - Giuseppe Agellio, Italian painter (born 1570)
  - Francesco Brenti, Italian painter
  - Jan Collaert II, Flemish engraver and printmaker (born c.1561)
