= Jeronima =

Jeronima or Jerónima is a feminine given name. It may refer to:

== People ==
- Jerónima de la Asunción (1555-1630), Spanish Catholic nun
- Jerónima Llorente (1793-1848), Spanish actress
- Jerônima Mesquita (1880-1972), Brazilian feminist
- Jerónima Nava y Saavedra (1669-1727), writer and Catholic religious from New Kingdom of Granada (present-day Colombia).

== Other ==
- The Nun Jerónima de la Fuente, portrait painting by Diego Velázquez
- Ang Luha at Lualhati ni Jeronima (The Sorrow and Happiness of Jeronima), 2018 Philippine short film

== See also ==
- Jeronimas
