= 1676 in art =

Events from the year 1676 in art.

== Events ==
- December 10 - Giuseppe Ghezzi exhibits a number of privately owned works by Venetian masters, borrowed from their owners, in the cloisters of San Salvatore in Rome.
- The portraitist Godfrey Kneller, together with his brother Johann Zacharias, moves from Germany to London, where he settles.

== Works ==
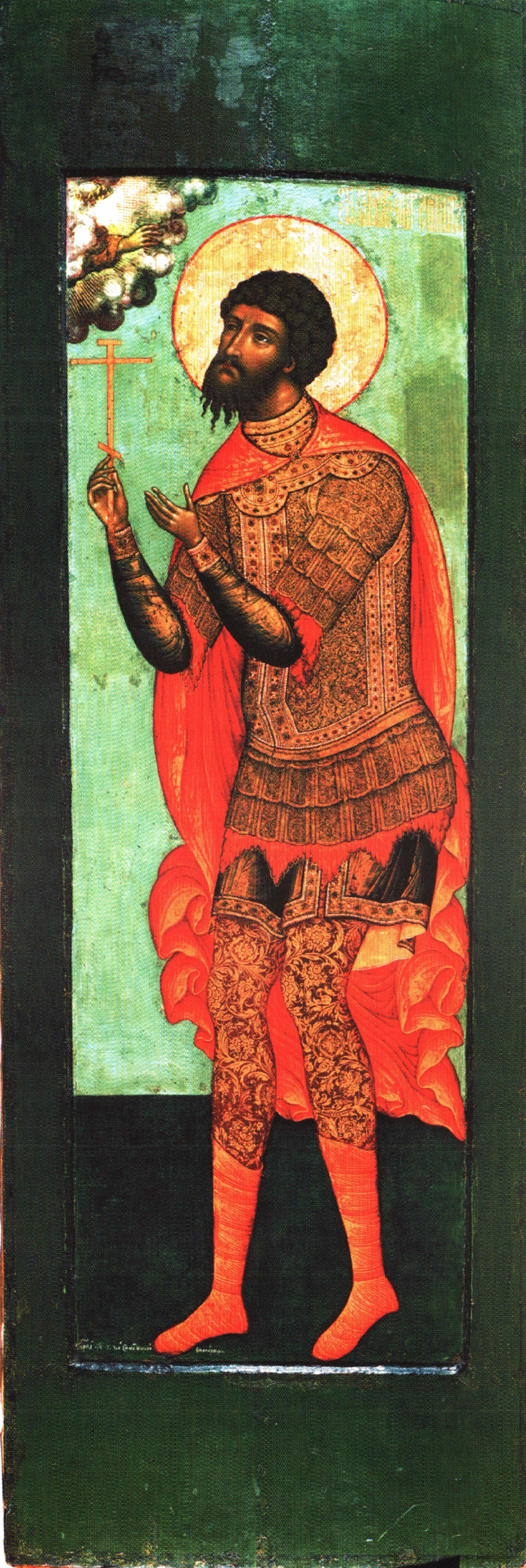
Ushakov – Theodore Stratelates

- Ludolf de Jongh - Scene in a Formal Garden (painting)
- Claude Lorrain - Aeneas taking leave of Dido in Carthage
- Grinling Gibbons - Statue of King Charles II in Roman costume (gilded bronze)
- Simon Ushakov - Theodore Stratelates

== Births ==
- February 2 - Francesco Maria Raineri, Italian sculptor of battle scenes, landscapes, and veduta with historical or mythologic figures (died 1758)
- April 24 - Johann Georg Beck, German engraver (died 1722)
- June 5 - Marco Ricci, Italian veduta painter (died 1729)
- date unknown
  - Pierre-Jacques Cazes, French historical painter (died 1754)
  - Sarah Hoadly, English portrait painter (died 1743)
  - Théobald Michau (or Micho), Flemish painter (died 1765)
  - Jeong Seon, Korean landscape painter (died 1759)

== Deaths ==
- February 14 - Abraham Bosse, French artist, printmaker in etching, and watercolour (born 1602-1604)
- May 20? - Jacques Courtois, French painter (born 1621)
- August 5 - Pierre Patel ("le bon Patel"), French Baroque era painter (born 1605)
- September - Pieter de Keyser, Dutch Golden Age sculptor and architect (born 1595)
- October 13 - Juan de Arellano, Spanish painter (born 1614)
- date unknown
  - Salvatore Castiglione, Italian painter of landscapes and pastoral subjects (born 1620)
  - Giovan Battista Langetti, Italian painter (born 1625)
  - Pierre Prieur, French enamel painter (born 1626)
  - Santo Rinaldi, Italian painter of battle scenes, landscapes, and vedute (born 1620)
  - Antoinette Bouzonnet-Stella, French engraver (born c.1641)
  - Domenicus van Tol, Dutch Golden Age painter (born 1635)
- probable
  - Bartolommeo Coriolano, Italian engraver (born 1599)
  - Abel Schrøder, Danish woodcarver (born 1602)
