= 1602 in art =

Events from the year 1602 in art.

== Events ==
- (unknown)

== Paintings ==
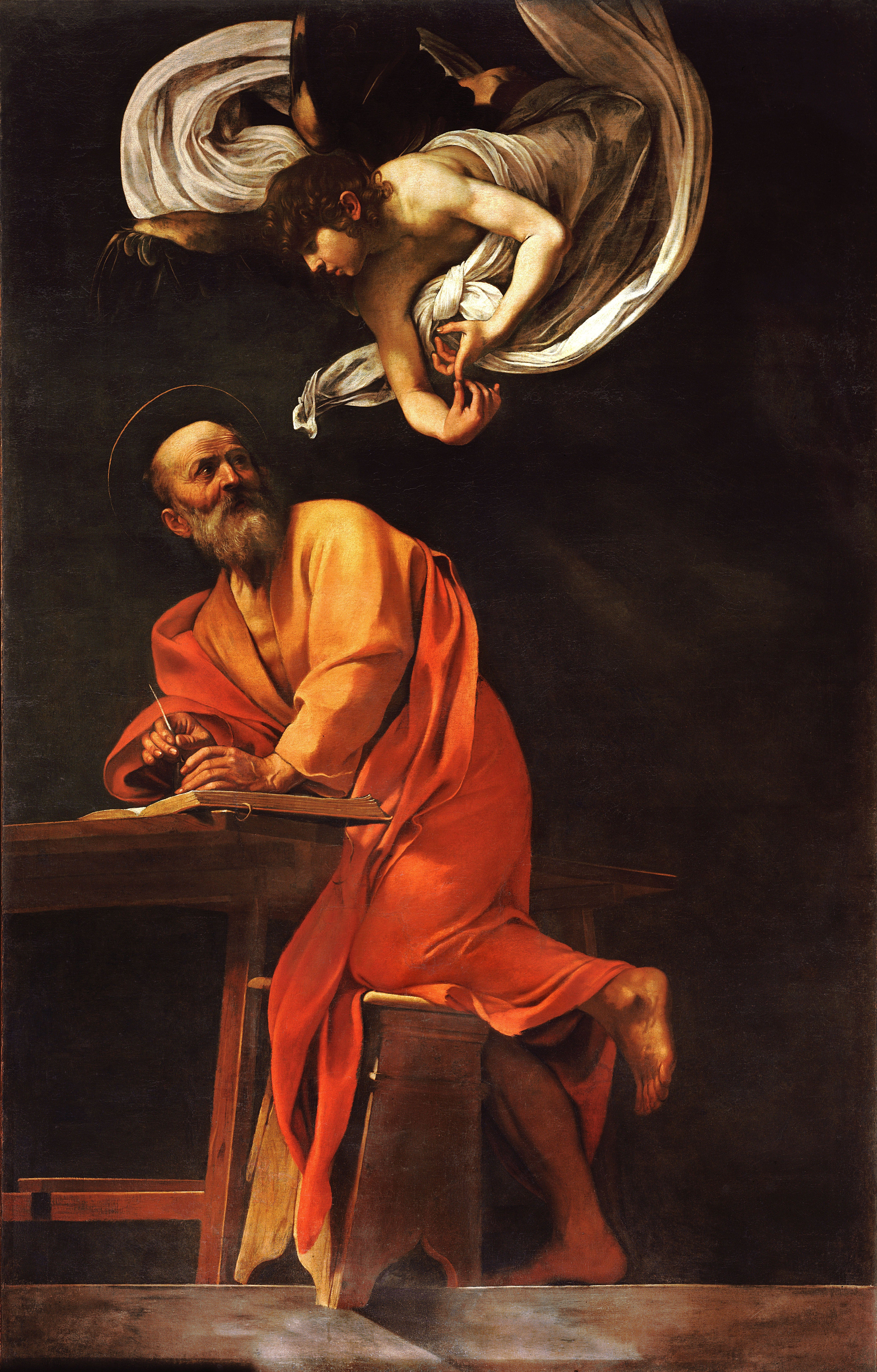
Caravaggio The Inspiration of Saint Matthew 1602

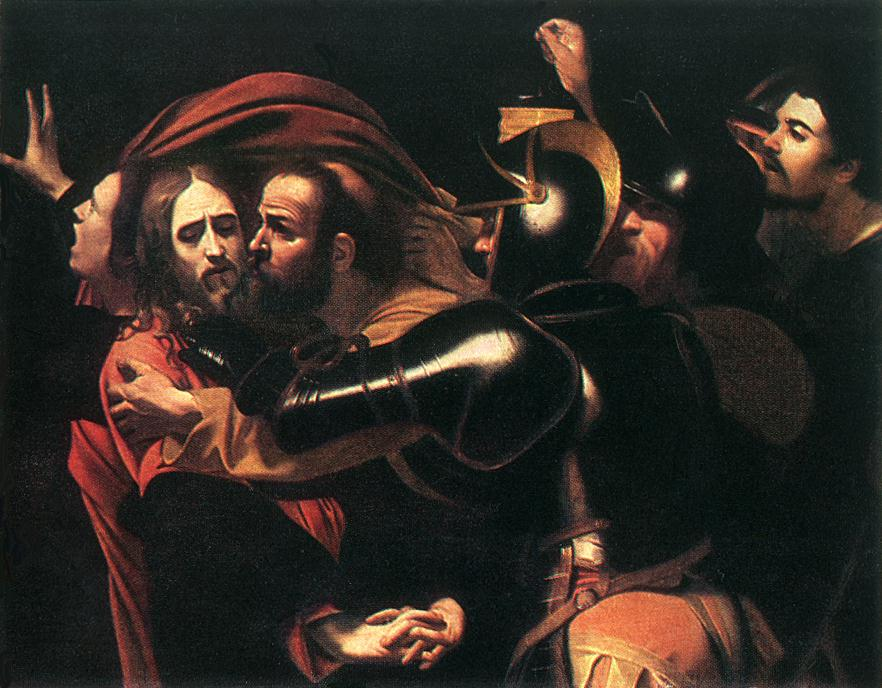
Caravaggio The Taking of Christ 1602

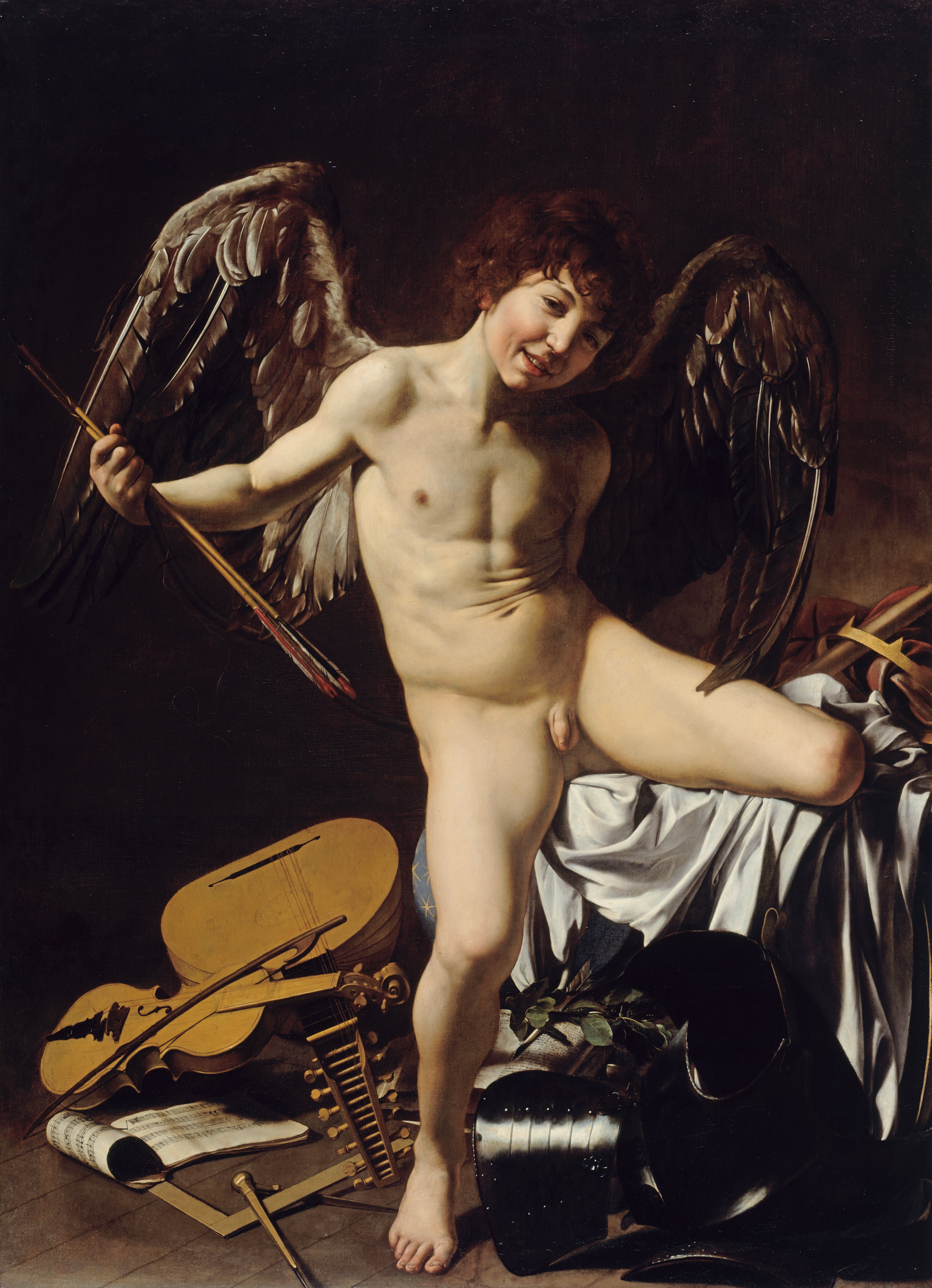
Caravaggio Amor Vincit Omnia 1601-1602

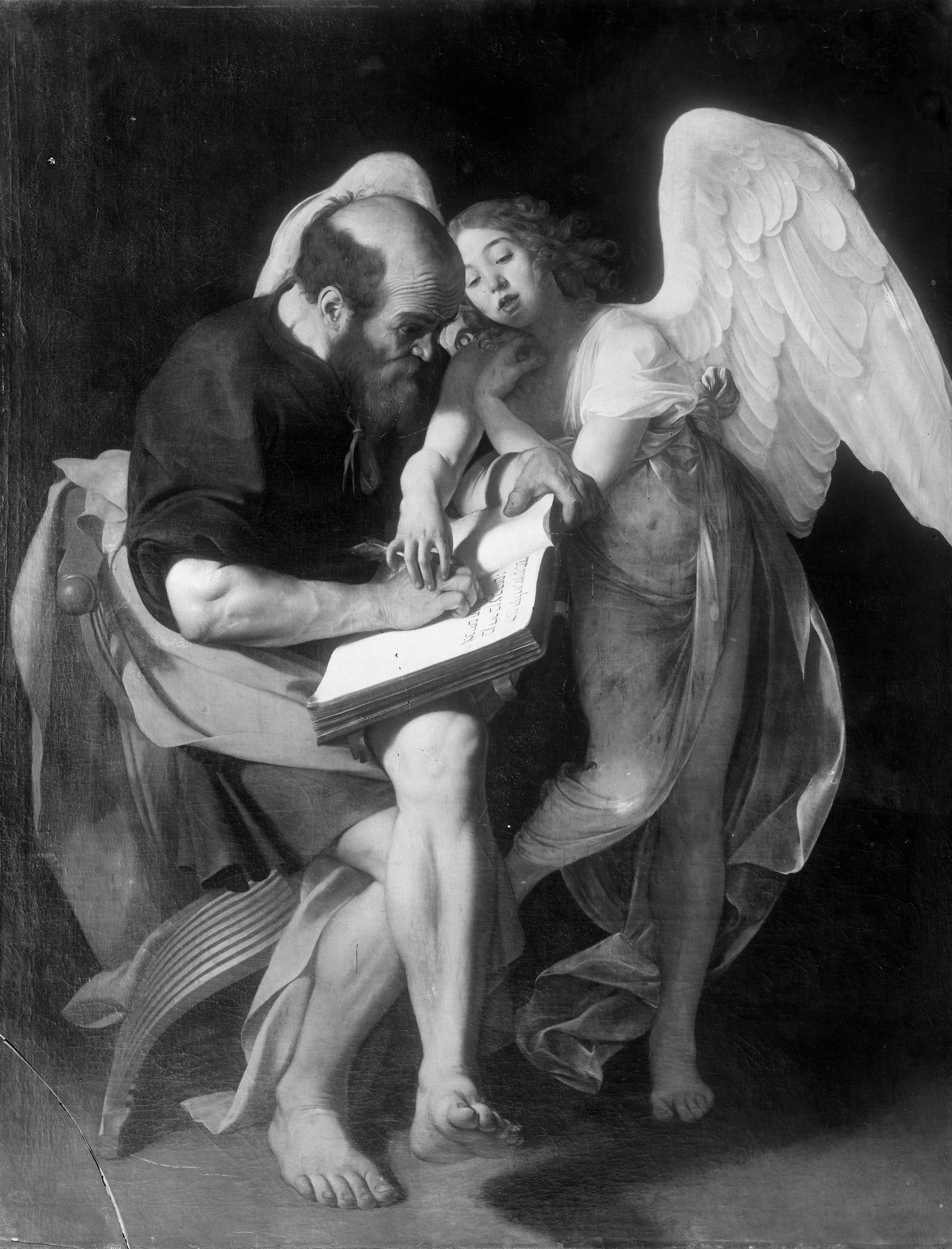
Caravaggio Saint Matthew and the Angel 1602

Caravaggio John the Baptist (Youth with a Ram) 1602

Caravaggio The Incredulity of Saint Thomas 1601-1602
- Pieter Brueghel the Younger - The Procession to Calvary
- Caravaggio
  - The Inspiration of Saint Matthew
  - The Taking of Christ
  - Amor Vincit Omnia
  - Saint Matthew and the Angel
  - John the Baptist (Youth with a Ram)
  - The Incredulity of Saint Thomas
- Karel van Mander - Garden of Love

== Births ==
- March 4 - Kanō Tanyū, Japanese painter (died 1674)
- May 26 - Philippe de Champaigne, Brabançon-born French Baroque portrait painter (died 1674)
- date unknown
  - Andrea Camassei, Italian painter active in Rome under the patronage of the Barberini (died 1649)
  - Francesco Costanzo Cattaneo, Italian painter of primarily soldiers and banditti (died 1665)
  - Michelangelo Cerquozzi, Italian painter of small canvases of genre scenes (died 1660)
  - Anthonie Palamedesz., Dutch painter (died 1673)
  - Antonio de Puga, Spanish Baroque painter (died 1648)
  - Evert van Aelst, Dutch painter of still lifes (died 1657)
- probable
  - Jacobus Mancadan, Dutch Golden Age painter mostly known for his pastoral landscapes (died 1680)
  - Abel Schrøder, Danish woodcarver (died 1676)
  - Salomon van Ruysdael, Dutch Golden Age landscape painter (died 1670)

== Deaths ==
- March 22 - Agostino Carracci, Italian printmaker (born 1557)
- August 23 - Sebastiano Filippi, Italian late Renaissance-Mannerist painter of the School of Ferrara (born 1536)
- October 7 - Thomas Schweicker, disabled German painter and calligrapher (born 1540)
- November 22 - Toussaint Dubreuil, French painter (born 1561)
- date unknown
  - Giacomo della Porta, Italian architect and sculptor (born c.1533)
  - Aert Mijtens, Flemish Renaissance painter (born 1541)
  - Jan Nagel, Dutch painter (born c.1560)
  - Daniël van den Queborn, Dutch painter (born 1552)
- probable
  - Pierre Courteys, French enamel painters of Limoges, designer and colorist (born unknown)
  - Santi di Tito, Italian painter of Late-Mannerist or proto-Baroque style (born 1536)
  - Adrian Vanson, Flemish court portrait painter (born unknown)
