= 1536 in art =

Events from the year 1536 in art.

== Events ==
- Piazza di Venezia opened in Rome.
- Hans Holbein the Younger is employed as King's Painter to Henry VIII of England by this date.

== Works ==
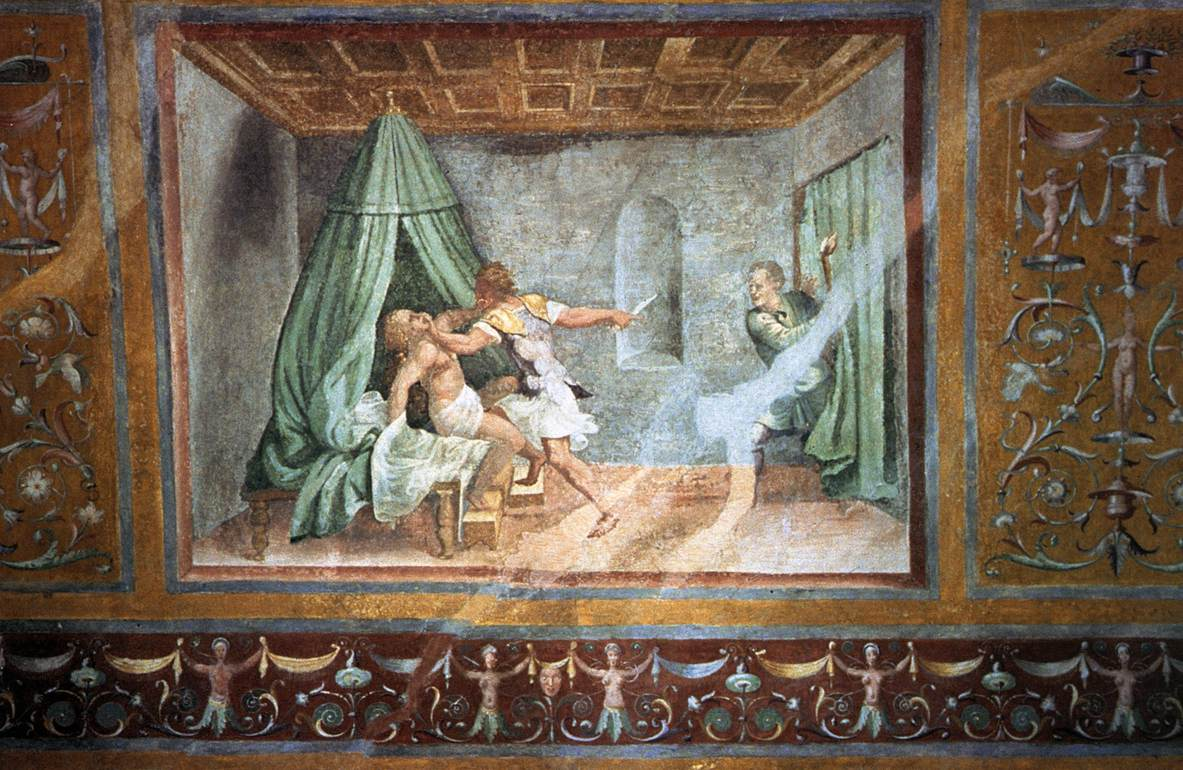
Romano – Tarquin and Lucretia, fresco, Ducal palace, Mantua

- Bramantino – The Flight into Egypt (Madonna del Sasso, Switzerland)
- Jean Clouet – Portrait of Guillaume Budé
- Hans Holbein (approximate date)
  - Portrait of Henry VIII
  - Portrait Miniature of Margaret Roper (approximate date)
- Giulio Romano – Tarquin and Lucretia
- Titian – La Belle
- Jan Sanders van Hemessen – The Prodigal Son

== Births ==
- Bernardo Buontalenti, Italian stage designer, architect, theatrical designer, military engineer and artist (died 1608)
- Vincenzo Campi, Italian painter of the Renaissance (died 1591)
- Sebastiano Filippi, Italian late Renaissance-Mannerist painter of the School of Ferrara (died 1602)
- Maso da San Friano, Italian painter active in Florence (died 1571)
- Santi di Tito, Italian painter of Late-Mannerist or proto-Baroque style (died 1602/1603)
- Teodoro Ghisi, Italian engraver (died 1601)
- Ottaviano Nonni, Italian architect, sculptor, and painter (died 1606)
- Barthélemy Prieur, French sculptor (died 1611)
- Siyâvash, Iranian illustrator of Georgian origin known for his miniatures (died 1616)
- Domenico Vitus, Italian engraver (died unknown)

== Deaths ==
- Michele da Verona, Italian painter of the Renaissance period (born 1470)
- Antonello Gagini, Italian sculptor of the High Renaissance (born 1478)
- Baldassare Peruzzi, Italian architect and painter (born 1481)
- Pedro Romana, Spanish Renaissance painter (born 1460)
- Hans Weiditz, German Renaissance woodcut artist (born 1495)
