= Sanssouci Picture Gallery =

Art museum in Sanssouci, Potsdam

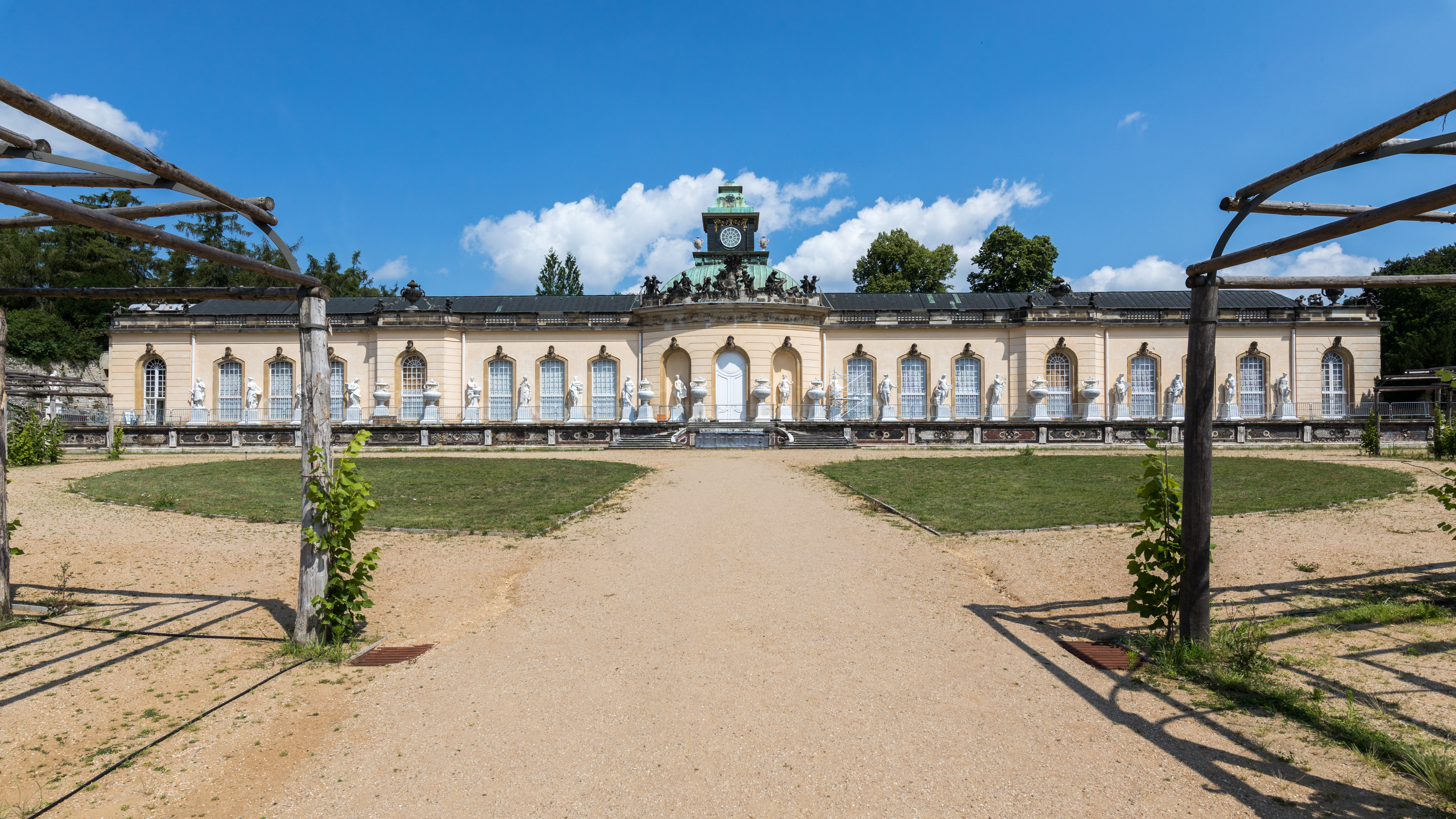
- South side of the Picture Gallery
- Interactive fullscreen map
- Location: Potsdam, Germany
- Coordinates: 52°24′14″N 13°02′28″E

The Picture Gallery (German: Bildergalerie) in the Sanssouci Park of Potsdam was built in 1755–64 during the reign of Frederick II of Prussia under the supervision of Johann Gottfried Büring. The Picture Gallery is situated east of the palace and is the oldest extant museum built for a ruler in Germany.

== History ==
Frederick II was a passionate collector of paintings. In his youth, he preferred the contemporary French art of the Rococo, and the walls of his rooms in Sanssouci were adorned with paintings of his favorite artist Antoine Watteau. After his accession to the throne in 1740, the king became increasingly interested in history paintings, which were highly regarded at his time. Especially, he collected works of renaissance, mannerism and Baroque art, mostly from Italian and Flemish artists. Due to the opening of the Altes Museum in Berlin in 1829, about fifty paintings were transferred there. Among these were the Leda by Correggio, three paintings by Rembrandt, some by Rubens, Anthony van Dyck, and Antoine Watteau. Also, all the marble statues were moved.

In 1929–30, the Picture Gallery was set up again, and 120 of the 159 works marked in the catalogue as purchased by Frederick returned from Berlin.

During World War II, all the paintings were moved to Rheinsberg Palace in Rheinsberg. Only ten paintings returned from there in 1946, and most of the pictures seemed lost.

However, a large collection of paintings confiscated by the Soviet Union was returned in 1958. However, some of the pictures are still in Russian collections.

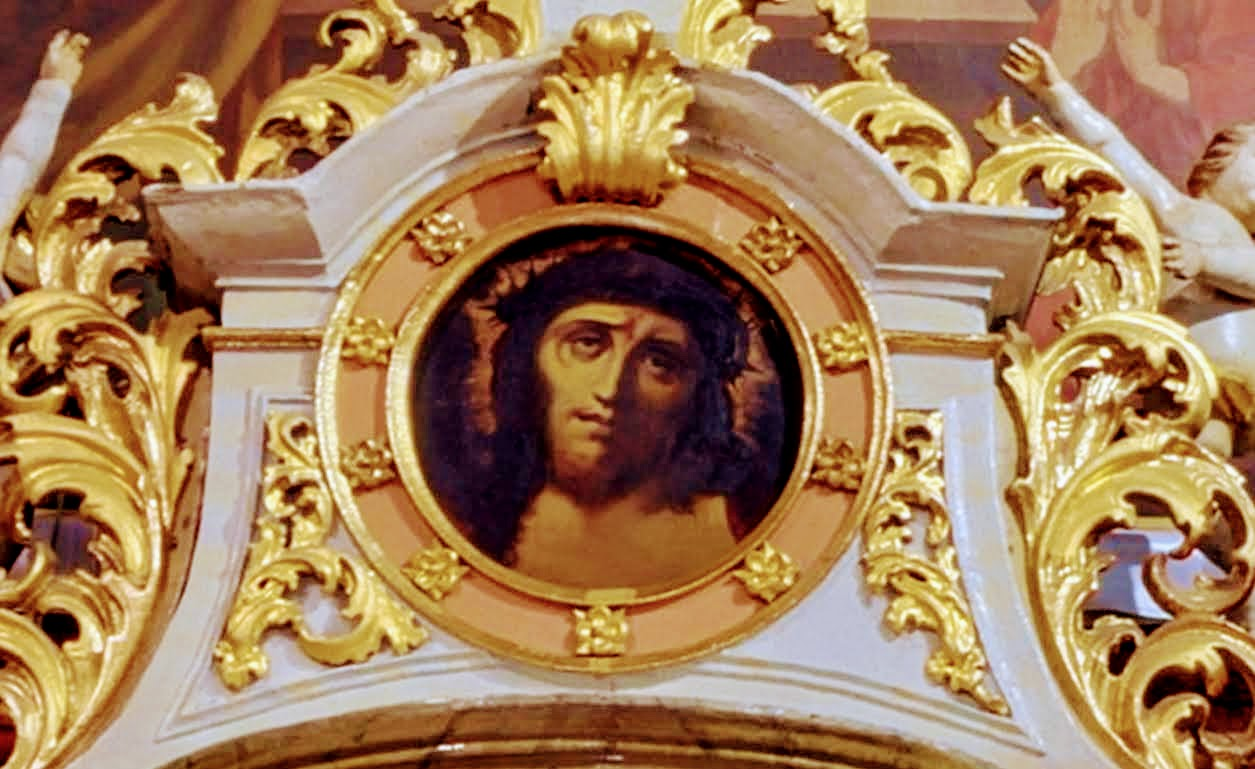
Christ by Alfred Lange from 1899 in the church of Saint Mary, Szprotawa as the only copy of Rafael Santi's lost painting from the Sanssouci gallery after the Second World War

== Outside architecture ==
The Picture Gallery was built in the place of a former greenhouse, which Frederick the Great had used to raise tropical fruit. Büring replaced this with a long, single-story building painted in yellow, the middle part of which is emphasized by a dome. On the garden side, marble sculptures stand between the windows reaching down to the floor. Most of the sculptures were made by Johann Gottlieb Heymüller and Johann Peter Benckert, and depict allegorical figures from arts and sciences. The heads on the keystones show portraits of artists.

== The gallery ==
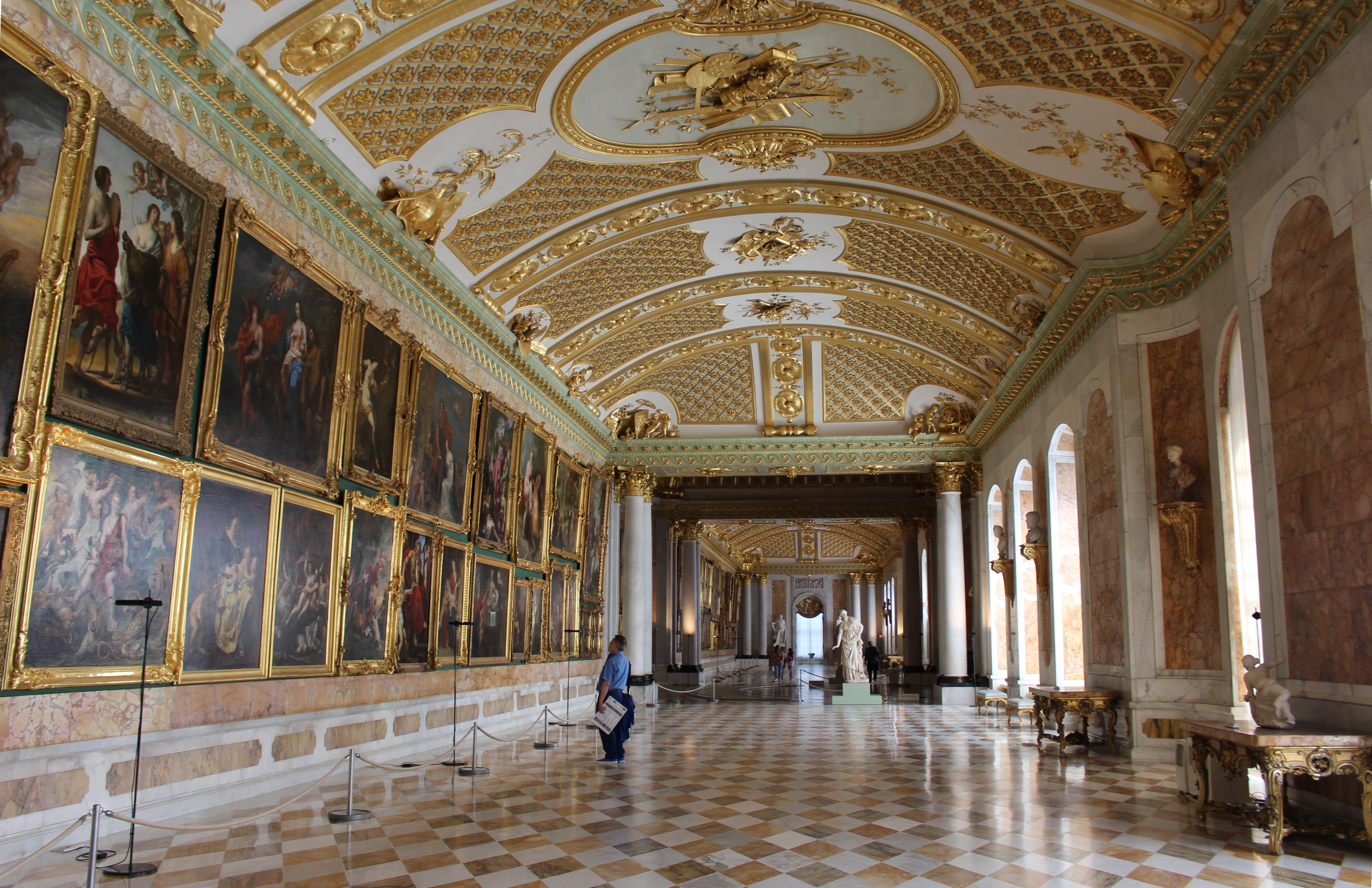
Interior of the Picture Gallery, looking east from the entrance

The gallery hall is magnificently designed with richly gilded ornaments on the slightly curved ceiling. The floor is laid out in matching colors with a rhombic pattern of white and yellow Italian marble. On the green walls, the framed paintings are laid out densely above and alongside each other in a Baroque style.

Some of the works exhibited are Caravaggio's The Incredulity of Saint Thomas, Anthony van Dycks Pentecost, and Four Evangelists and Saint Hieronymus from the workshop of Peter Paul Rubens. Adjacent to the long gallery hall is the similarly richly arranged cabinet, where the paintings of smaller format are exhibited.

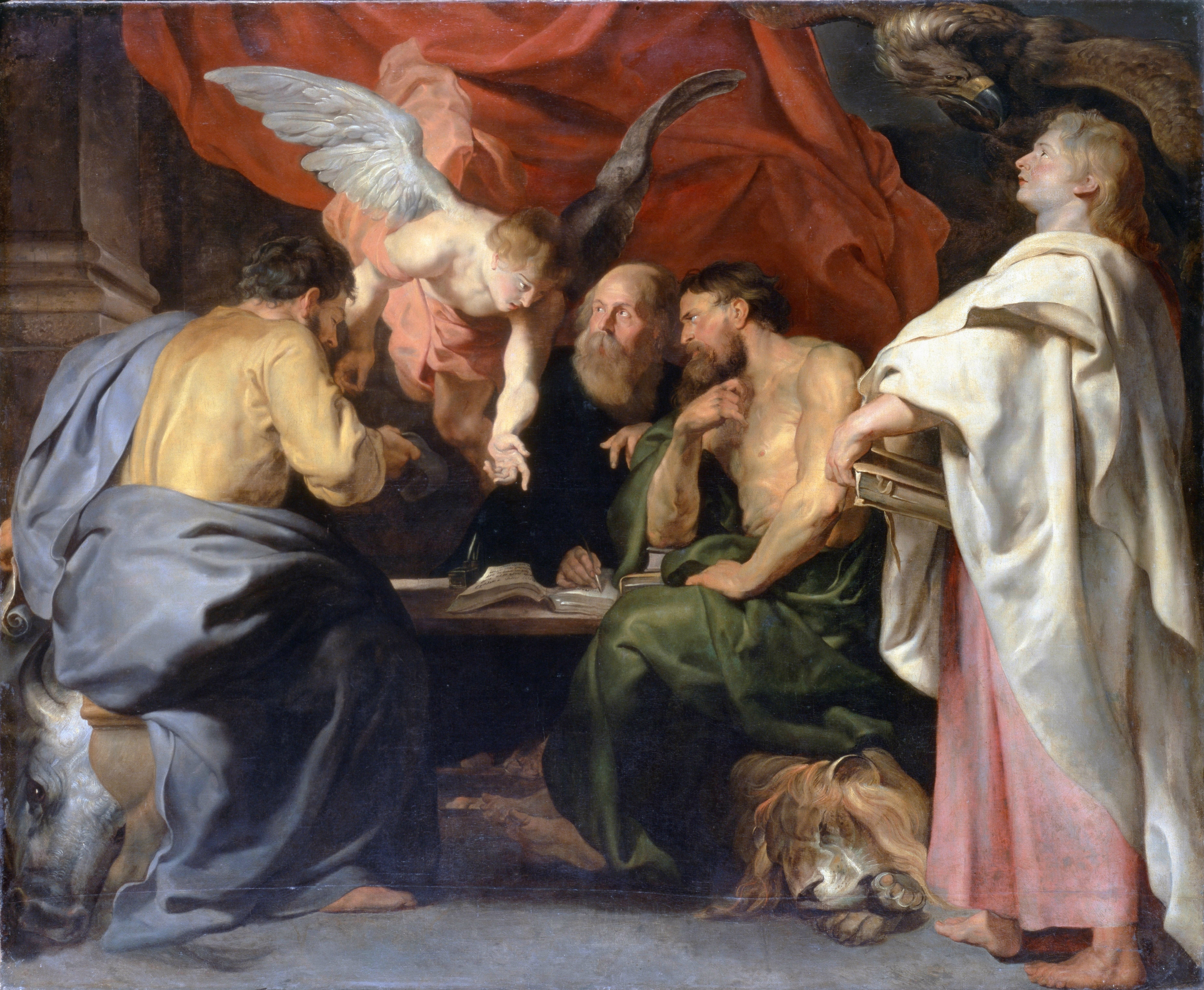
Peter Paul Rubens - Four Evangelists

Caravaggio - Increduility of St Thomas
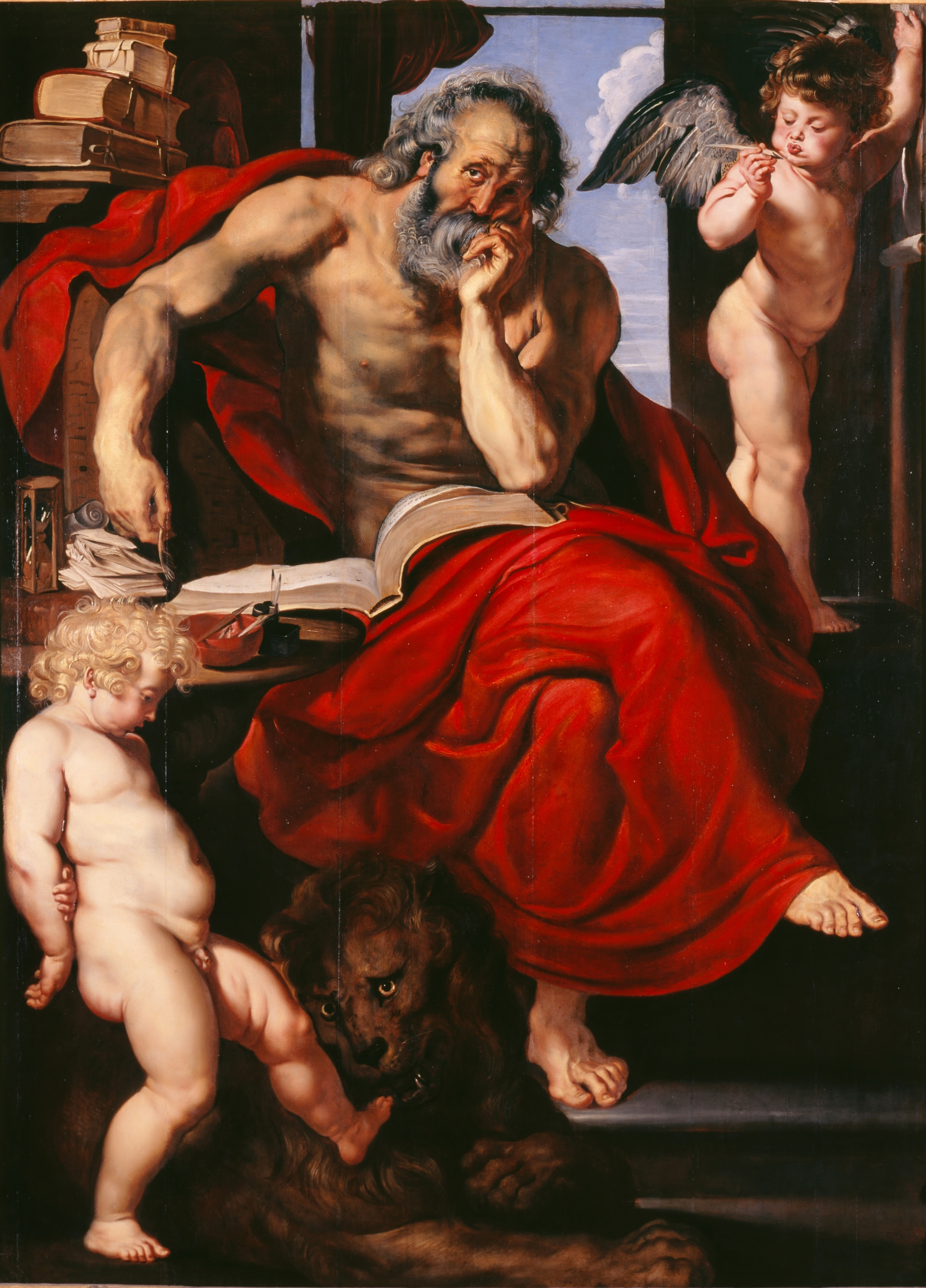
Peter Paul Rubens - Saint Hieronymus
