= Giovanni Battista Bonacina =

Italian painter and engraver

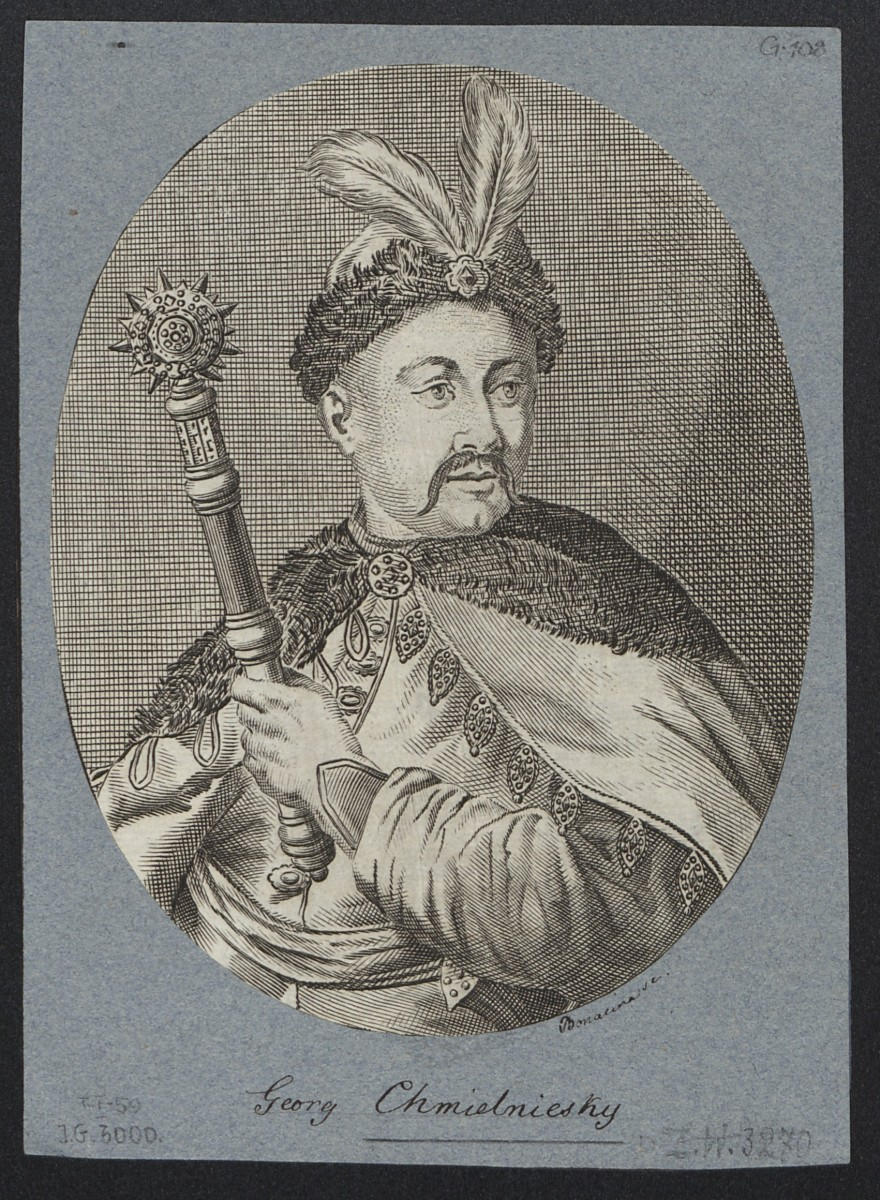
Yurii Khmelnytsky by Giovanni Battista Bonacina

Giovanni Battista Bonacina (born c. 1620) was an Italian painter and engraver of the Baroque period. He was born in Milan. He was influenced by Cornelis Bloemaert. He made portraits of Pope Clement IX, Guido and Hermes Visconti, and Giovanni Battista Conte Truchi. He also engraved The Alliance of Jacob and Laban and St. Martin kneeling before the Virgin and Infant Jesus after Pietro da Cortona, and a Holy Family, with St. Catharine and St. John after Andrea del Sarto.
