= The Incredulity of Saint Thomas (Caravaggio) =

Painting by Caravaggio

- Incredulità di San Tommaso (Italian)
- Artist: Caravaggio
- Year: 1602
- Medium: Oil on canvas
- Dimensions: 107 cm × 146 cm (42 in × 57 in)
- Location: Sanssouci Picture Gallery, Potsdam

The Incredulity of Saint Thomas is an oil canvas painting by Caravaggio, created c. 1601–1602. It was painted for Vincenzo Giustiniani (noted by Giovanni Pietro Bellori) and later entered the Royal Collection of Prussia, survived the Second World War unscathed, and is now in the Sanssouci Picture Gallery, in Potsdam.

It shows the episode that gave rise to the term "Doubting Thomas" which, formally known as the Incredulity of Thomas, had been frequently represented in Christian art since at least the 5th century, and used to make a variety of theological points. According to the Gospel of John, Thomas the Apostle missed one of Jesus's appearances to the Apostles after his resurrection, and said "Unless I see the nail marks in his hands and put my finger where the nails were, and put my hand into his side, I will not believe it." A week later, Jesus appeared and told Thomas to touch him and stop doubting. Then Jesus said, "Because you have seen me, you have believed; blessed are those who have not seen and yet have believed."

The painting shows in a demonstrative gesture how the doubting apostle puts his finger into Christ's side wound, the latter guiding his hand. The unbeliever is depicted like a peasant, dressed in a robe torn at the shoulder and with dirt under his fingernails. The composition of the picture is such that the viewer is directly involved in the event and feels the intensity of the process.

The light falling on Christ emphasizes his physicality and at the same time suggests his divinity and significance to the viewer. Caravaggio was a master of light and shadow, and he uses this chiaroscuro to create a narrative through line in this piece. The shadows (representing doubt) sweep over St. Thomas, but as he touches Christ he is drawn into the light.

== Analysis ==
The paintings features heavy chiaroscuro. Thomas's face shows surprise as Jesus holds his hand and guides it into the wound. The absence of a halo emphasizes the corporeality of the risen Christ. Behind Thomas are two other apostles, probably Saint Peter and Saint John the Evangelist. Peter is subject of other works by Caravaggio, namely the Crucifixion of Saint Peter (1601) and The Denial of Saint Peter (1610).

Caravaggio, in the horizontal dimension of the canvas, "photographs" the moment of observation in a three-quarter frame in which he arranges the four figures on a neutral and dark background. This allows the viewer's attention to be focused on Thomas' head, while the light illuminates Christ's forehead, profile and clear side, allowing us to draw attention to the anxious and unsettled posture of Thomas, who is being comforted by Christ and to whom he bends his head. The close arrangement of the four heads and a triangle of gazes, with the focus on Thomas' gesture, allows for a further emotional concentration of the viewer's gaze, which can now focus on the centre of the "drama": the revelation of the real presence in the flesh of Jesus. Caravaggio shows the apostle Thomas who, following a certain iconographic tradition, sticks a finger into Jesus' spear wound while two other apostles observe the scene. The facial expression of Christ can only be compared in simplicity and beauty to Leonardo's Mona Lisa. Also on the compositional level we observe the intersection of two main axes, the horizontal one consisting of the arm of Thomas and the hands of Jesus and the vertical one running from the head of the two apostles (or better between both heads) and continuing exactly at the neck of the apostle Thomas. This arrangement is rounded off by an arch formed by the two backs of Thomas and Christ: An admirable interlocking of human forms "thrown" into the foreground, with great emotional impact. The gesture of Thomas and the hand of Christ that accompanies him explode in an extraordinary "zoomata", enhanced by the light coming from the left (the light of Revelation) that illuminates the doubt, the astonishment (in the fronts of the apostles) and the reality of the living flesh of the Saviour.

Painters came to Rome, especially from the Netherlands, to study Caravaggio's work. Rembrandt, who never visited Italy, became acquainted with Caravaggio's painting style through the Utrecht Caravaggisti. He can also be regarded as a representative of Caravaggism, albeit a rather late one. His turn to a radical realism, which he adhered to until the end of his life, is hardly conceivable without the example of Caravaggio and his successors. This also applies to Rembrandt's use of light. Caravaggio's paintings also left a deep impression on Peter Paul Rubens. Among the painters influenced by Caravaggio, apart from the Utrecht Caravaggists, are Orazio Gentileschi, Artemisia Gentileschi, Bartolomeo Manfredi, Georges de La Tour, Jusepe de Ribera and Johann Ulrich Loth. Caravaggio's influences are also evident in paintings by Johannes Vermeer, Diego Velázquez and Francisco de Zurbarán.

This pictorial motif is probably related to Saint Matthew and the Angel (1602) and the Sacrifice of Isaac (1603), all having a model in common. The Potsdam painting belonged to Vincenzo Giustiniani before entering the Prussian royal collection, surviving the Second World War intact.

== History ==
In 1606, the banker Vincenzo Giustiniani mentioned this subject in a copy in Genoa, and twenty years later the painting was mentioned in the inventory of the Giustiniani collection, suggesting that the banker himself commissioned the work, a hypothesis confirmed in some sources.

Incidentally, the sombre realism of the work could only have been welcomed by one of Caravaggio's greatest followers. From the Giustiniani inventory of 1638 we learn that there is "in the Stanza Grande de Quadri Antichi ... un quadro sopraporto di mezze figure con l'Historia di San Tomasso che toucca il Costato di Christo col dito depito in tela alto pal. 5 pal.larg.6 by the hand of Michelangelo da Caravaggio with a black frame profiled and guilloché with gold" Bellori wrote of the Potsdam painting in 1672: "St Thomas placing his finger in the wound at the Lord's side, placing his hand close to the wound and exposing his breast with a cloth, removing it from the stern". After the dispersal of the Giustiniani collection, the painting was sent to Prussia and purchased by the state in 1816, taken to Charlottenburg Palace and later to the Sanssouci Picture Gallery in Potsdam, where it remains today.

== See also ==
- List of paintings by Caravaggio
