= Jerónima de la Asunción =

Spanish nun and Servant of God

Servant of God Jerónima de la Asunción O.S.C.
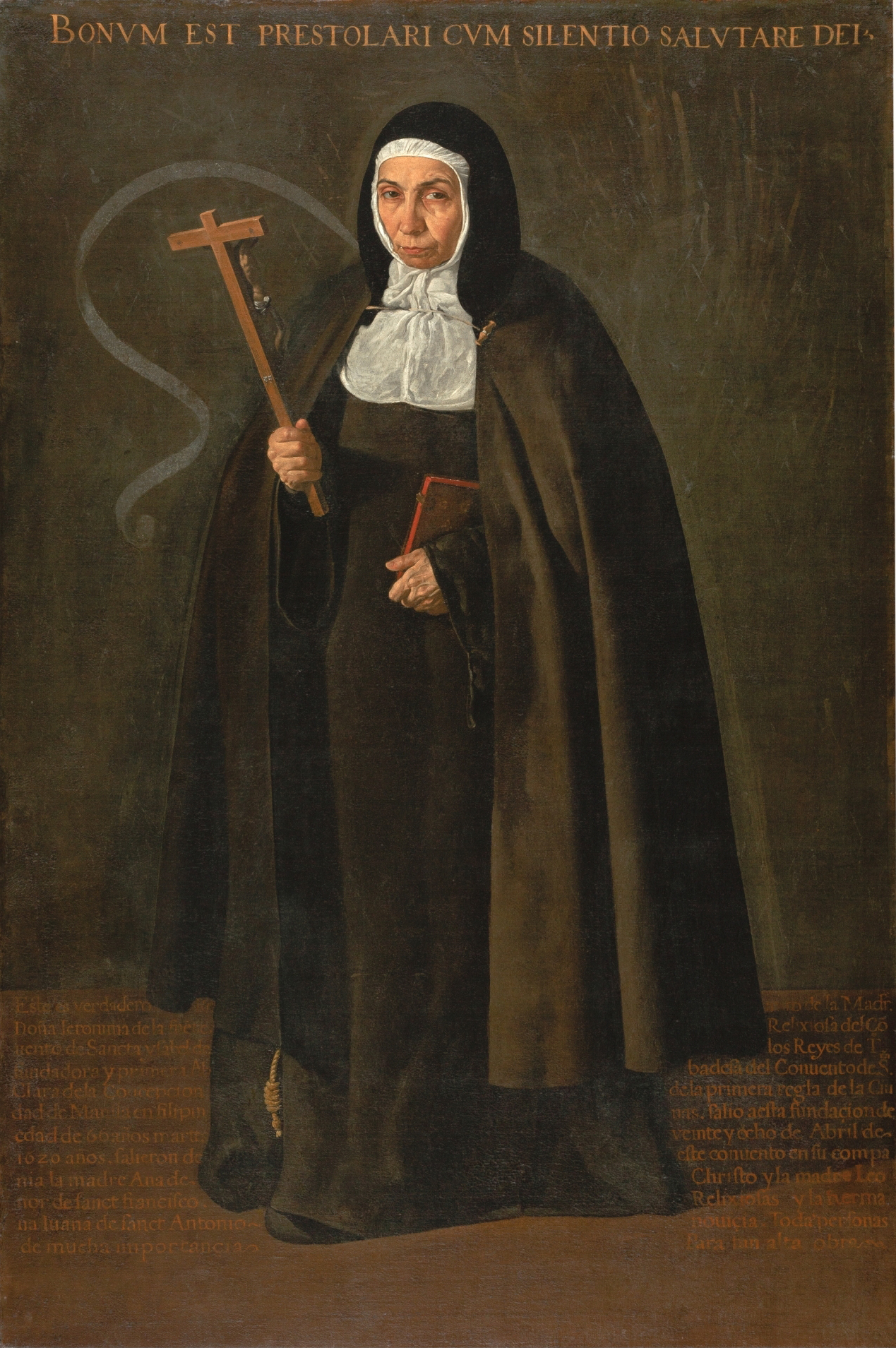
- The Nun Jerónima de la Fuente by Diego Velázquez

Poor Clare Nun
- Born: 9 May 1555; Toledo, Spain
- Died: 22 October 1630 (aged 75); Manila, Captaincy General of the Philippines
- Resting place: Real Monasterio de Santa Clara de Manila, Quezon City, Philippines
- Venerated in: Catholic Church

Jerónima de la Asunción, O.S.C. (Spanish: Jerónima de la Asunción García Yánez y De La Fuente; 9 May 1555 – 22 October 1630) was a Spanish Catholic nun and abbess who founded the Real Monasterio de Santa Clara (Royal Monastery of Saint Clare) in Intramuros, Manila, Philippines.

For her efforts in establishing the first Catholic monastery in Manila and the Far East, the Vatican issued an apostolic decree for her beatification in 1734. This monastery was immortalized in the novel Noli Me Tángere, penned by the national hero, José Rizal.

== Biography ==
Jerónima was born in Toledo, Spain to Pedro García e Yáñez and Catalina de la Fuente of Toledo, who were pious, prosperous and of the lower nobility. Jerónima spent her childhood in Toledo, where she learned the basics of Christian life very early on. She grew up on the Calle de lod Letrados, next to the Church of San Marcos. At the age of fourteen, she met the great Carmelite reformer, Teresa of Ávila, after which she felt the calling to monastic life. She was also influenced by a biography of Clare of Assisi.

On 15 August 1570 Jerónima entered the enclosed monastery of Santa Isabel de los Reyes of Toledo. At this monastery, she joined two of her paternal aunts who were already professed nuns in the community which follow the more austere First Rule of Saint Clare. She worked successively as a nurse, henkeeper, sacristan, vicar of the choir, and provisioner. She later occasionally functioned as Mistress of Novices, and gradually developed a reputation for being a holy woman. Wealthy donors would send her gifts and ask for her prayers. She commissioned devotional artwork and statues. "She sent pots of chicken and bacon to the prison and local hospitals. She handed out bread and eggs to beggars who frequented the convent torno (revolving door)."

=== Voyage to the Far East ===
A pamphlet cover with a reproduction of Velázquez's 1620 painting of Mother Jerónima.

The notion of establishing a convent in Manila was first brought up to Jerónima in 1599 by the Dominican Diego Soria, who stressed its importance. Some who supported idea felt that it would strengthen the crown's commitment to the islands. Authorisation for the transfer to the Philippines was delayed by the inconveniences and difficulties posed by the Council of the Indies due to problems of finance and patronage. Franciscan Pedro Matías mentioned the holy nun of Santa Isabel to a wealthy couple, who decided to become patrons of a convent, provided Jerónima was the abbess. Friar José de Santa María, was named Procurator to arrange the necessary royal travel permits and other financial matters for the venture, while Jerónima herself was appointed as foundress and first abbess of the Philippine monastery. The new monastery would be the first of its kind, both to be established in Manila and the entire Far East.

Jerónima's journey began in April 1620, with an initial group of six nuns; she was already 66 years old at that time. From Toledo, they traveled by carriages loaned by the king to Seville where they arrived in mid-May, where she was portrayed by the young Velázquez. They were joined by two more nuns, and then went on to Cádiz, from where they set sail across the Atlantic Ocean with the fleet for New Spain. Arriving at Veracruz, they traveled overland to Mexico City, which they reached by late September 1620. They stayed there for about six months at another monastery of the Order, and where two more nuns from that community joined the group.

Accompanied by two friars and two male servants, on Ash Wednesday of 1621, Jerónima and her group left Mexico by road to cross the mountains by mule to Acapulco. Once there, on 21 April 1621, the group boarded the galleon San Andrés to sail for the Philippines.

Sor Ana de Cristo kept a record of their journey from Toledo to Manila. One nun died during the crossing, while the ship was near the Mariana Islands. The rest of the group eventually landed in the port of Bolinao on 24 July 1621. They traveled by litter south, reaching Intramuros, the colony's capital, on 5 August 1621. They arrived one year, three months and nine days after leaving Toledo.

Initially well received by the civil and ecclesiastical authorities, disagreements soon arose, both over the accommodation arranged and over the admission to the convent of young marriageable girls - which reduced the chances of marriage for the descendants of the conquistadors in a society where Spanish women were scarce. Sor Jerónima's determination to maintain the purity of the rule in all its rigour, renouncing dowries and the presence of handmaids or servants of the nuns in the convent to preserve poverty, and her desire to admit mestizo or indigenous women along with the Spaniards, also brought her into conflict with the rectors of her own order, who in 1623 deprived her of her position as abbess.

=== The repudiation of Filipinas ===
The royal foundation was specifically created for "pious Spanish women and daughters of the conquistadors who cannot marry properly" without mention of native women. Around 1628, the application of Doña María Uray of Dapitan ("Uray" denoting her status as a native noblewoman), was rejected simply because she was classified as an "Indio." Madre Jerónima had requested permission to establish a convent in Pandacan for native women, but had been overruled by higher authorities both in the church and government.

In 1633, Martha de San Bernardo applied for admission. She was from a wealthy family in Labuad Kapampangan (Pampanga) and spoke Spanish. When the Franciscan superiors denied her request, the nuns at the Royal Monastery of Santa Clara decided to send her to their new house in Macao, which was outside the priests' jurisdiction. Learning of this, the Franciscan guardian in the Philippines directed that she should receive the habit en route so that both superiors could disavow responsibility if questioned. Thus Martha de San Bernardo became the first Filipino nun.

The first Japanese novice was Sor Lucia de San Juan.

=== Later life and death ===
During the last thirty years of her life, Jerónima lived in constant illness. In early September 1630, her health deteriorated. She died at dawn on 22 October 1630, at the age of 75.

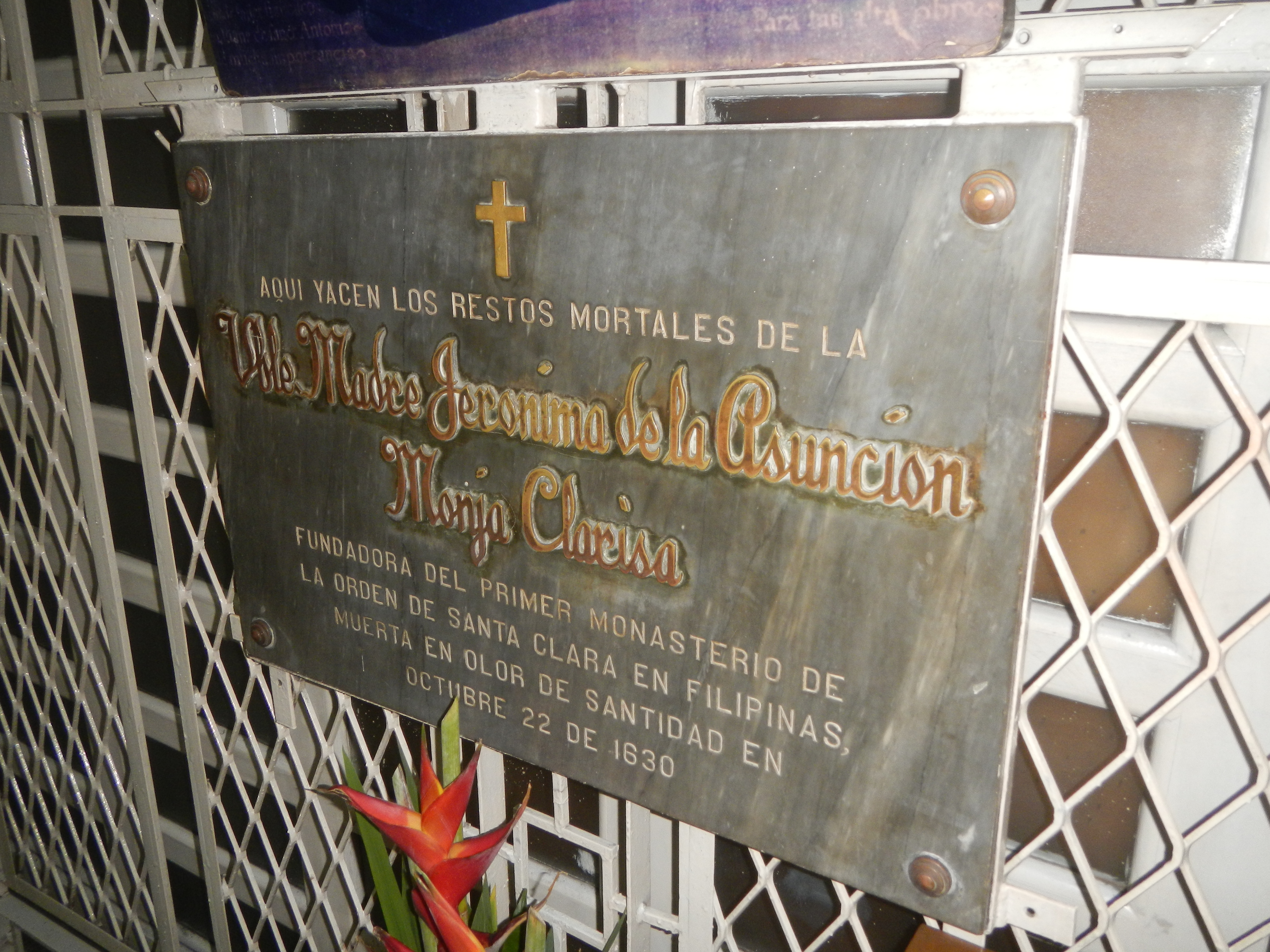
Tomb of Jerónima de la Asunción at Real Monasterio de Santa Clara de Manila in Quezon City.

Jerónima's remains were first buried in a niche within a wall inside the monastery, but later relocated five times. The first was in 1670 to deter local devotees, while the second happened in 1712 due to the reconstruction of the monastery, when the remains were placed in the lower choir. The third relocation was during the British Occupation of Manila in 1763, when her coffin was transferred to the old Church of Saint Francis in Intramuros. The remains were returned to the monastery in 1765, and later survived the aerial bombings during the Battle of Manila in 1945. In the 1950s, her bones were finally placed at the Real Monasterio de Santa Clara de Manila in Quezon City.

== Portrait ==
Modern-day photographs and images of Jerónima de la Asunción are replicas of the depiction by the court painter Diego Velázquez. The portrait was composed during Jerónima's almost two month stopover in Seville en route to the Philippines.

The painting is described as conveying the then-sixty-six-year-old nun's "devoutness and strength of character through her stern expression and rugged countenance; her direct, outward gaze at the beholder; and her expressive accoutrements". Jerónima is depicted wearing her dark religious habit while holding a book and a crucifix.

The inscriptions on the painting read "It is good to await the salvation of God in silence" (top), while the banderole that flows from her mouth reads "I shall be satisfied as long as He is glorified".

== Canonisation process ==
Although not born in the Philippines, Jerónima became a religious inspiration for many Catholic devotees. She was described as a woman of resolute character in managing political and religious conflicts both within and outside the confines of her monastery. Steps towards her canonisation began in 1630, but to date, they have not proceeded.

Jerónima dictated her Life to Sister Ana de Cristo, one of the sisters who participated with her in the foundation. These notes were partially collected in the biography dedicated to her by her confessor, Fray Ginés de Quesada, martyred in Japan in 1636, whose manuscript, dated 1634, remained unpublished until 1717 when it was issued in connection with efforts to promote her beatification.

== See also ==
- Martha de San Bernardo, the first Filipino nun
- Ignacia del Espiritu Santo
- Religious of the Virgin Mary
- Three Fertility Saints of Obando, Bulacan, Philippines
- Colettine Poor Clares
- List of Filipinos venerated in the Catholic Church
