= Cecco del Caravaggio =

Italian painter

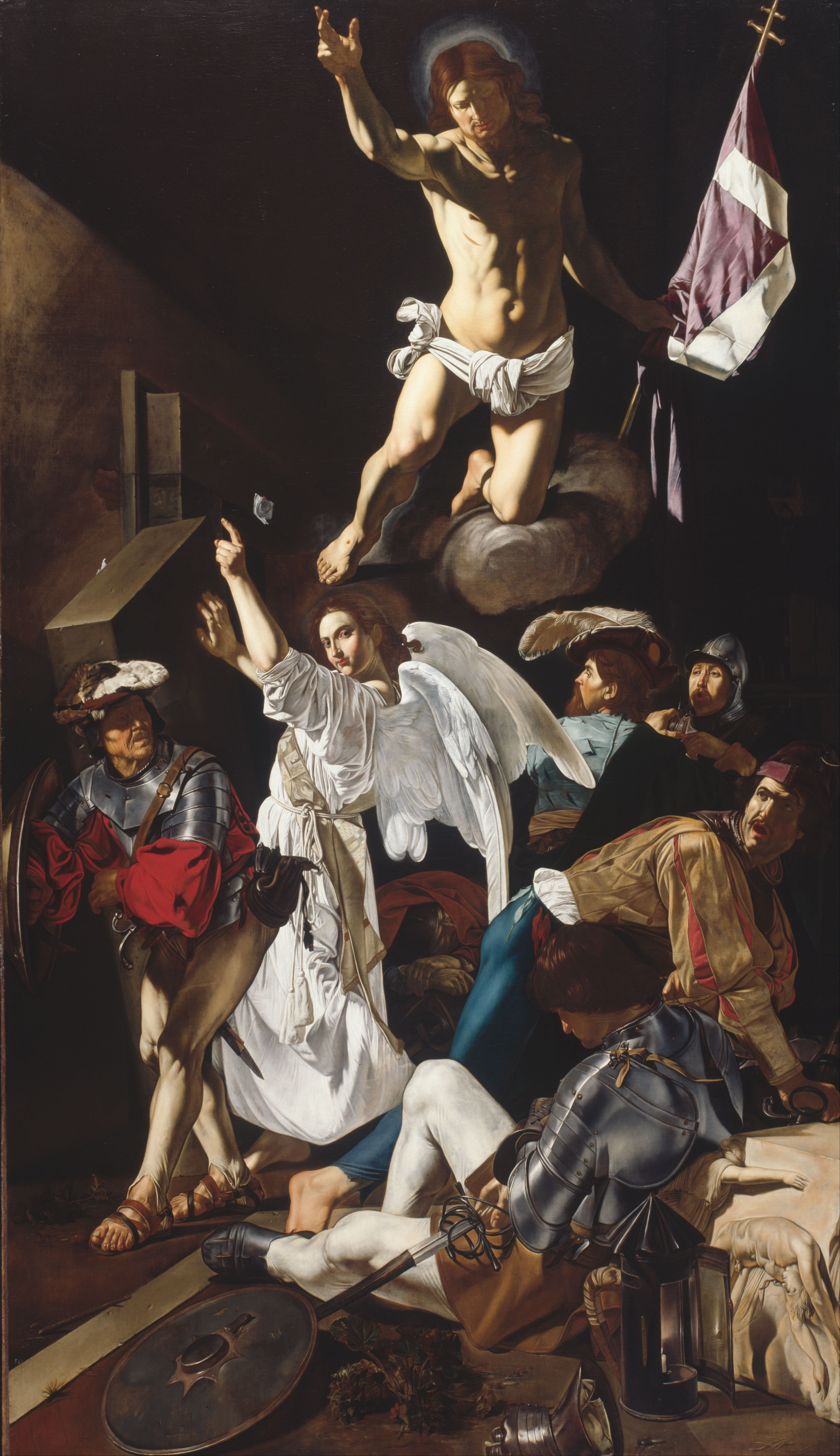
The Resurrection

Cecco del Caravaggio (active c. 1610 – mid-1620s) is the Notname given to a painter who worked in Rome in the early decades of the 17th century and was an important early follower of Caravaggio (1571–1610). In the past, art historians have suggested he may have been a Flemish, French or Spanish Caravaggist but more recently some have identified the artist with Francesco Boneri (or Buoneri), although this is not universally accepted. In his work the artist responded in a very individual and original manner to Caravaggio's naturalism.

== Life ==
Little is known about Cecco del Caravaggio. His active period appears to have been from 1610 to the mid-1620s. The name "Cecco" is a diminutive of "Francesco". In his guide to contemporary artists written for fellow-collectors in about 1620 entitled Considerazioni sulla Pittura, Giulio Mancini mentions a 'Francesco detto Cecco del Caravaggio' ("Francesco, known as 'Cecco del Caravaggio'") as one of the great master's more noteworthy followers. A 'Cecco' is recorded among French artists working with Agostino Tassi at Bagnaia in 1613–15, and hence the artist has been thought to be of French origin. Other scholars have detected a Spanish or even Flemish influence. In 2001, the scholar Gianni Papi identified this Cecco del Caravaggio as the Lombard artist Francesco Boneri (or Buoneri), and this now seems to be generally, although not universally accepted.

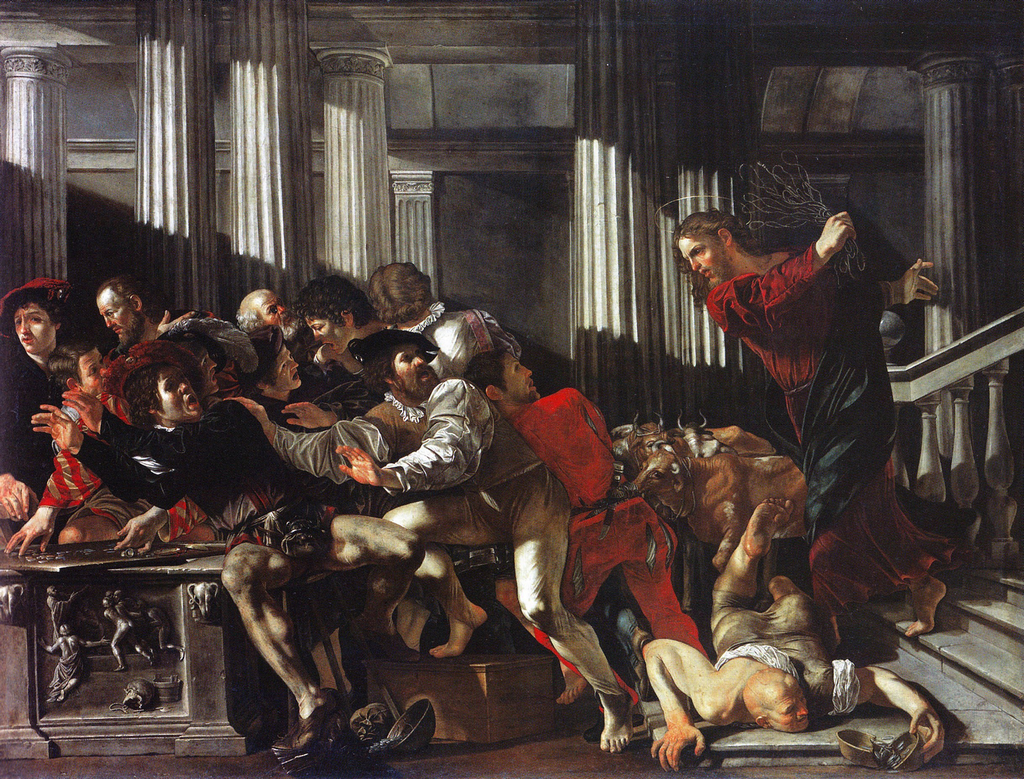
Christ Driving the Money Changers from the Temple

An identification has also been made between Francesco Boneri/Cecco del Caravaggio and the boy who modeled for a number of paintings done by Caravaggio in the period 1600/1606, including the famous Amor Vincit and the John the Baptist in the Capitoline Museum in Rome. The identification is based on the statements found in early authors that the model for Amor Vincit was a boy named Cecco, who was also Caravaggio's servant and possibly pupil.

== Work ==
None of Cecco's works are signed or dated, and hence his oeuvre is difficult to identify and date. He is associated with a number of genre pieces, portraits and religious works showing a clear debt to Caravaggio. He had an interest in depictions of low life themes but also painted religious compositions. His important religious works include Resurrection (Art Institute of Chicago) and Christ Driving the Money Changers from the Temple (Gemäldegalerie, Berlin).

The key influence on Cecco was Caravaggio, but other Caravaggisti, such as Bartolomeo Manfredi, formed an additional influence. His style exhibits common traits with the works of these other Caravaggisti, such as the depiction of large, solid figures, strong contrasts between light and dark and complex drapery folds.

== Gallery ==
Cecco del Caravaggio

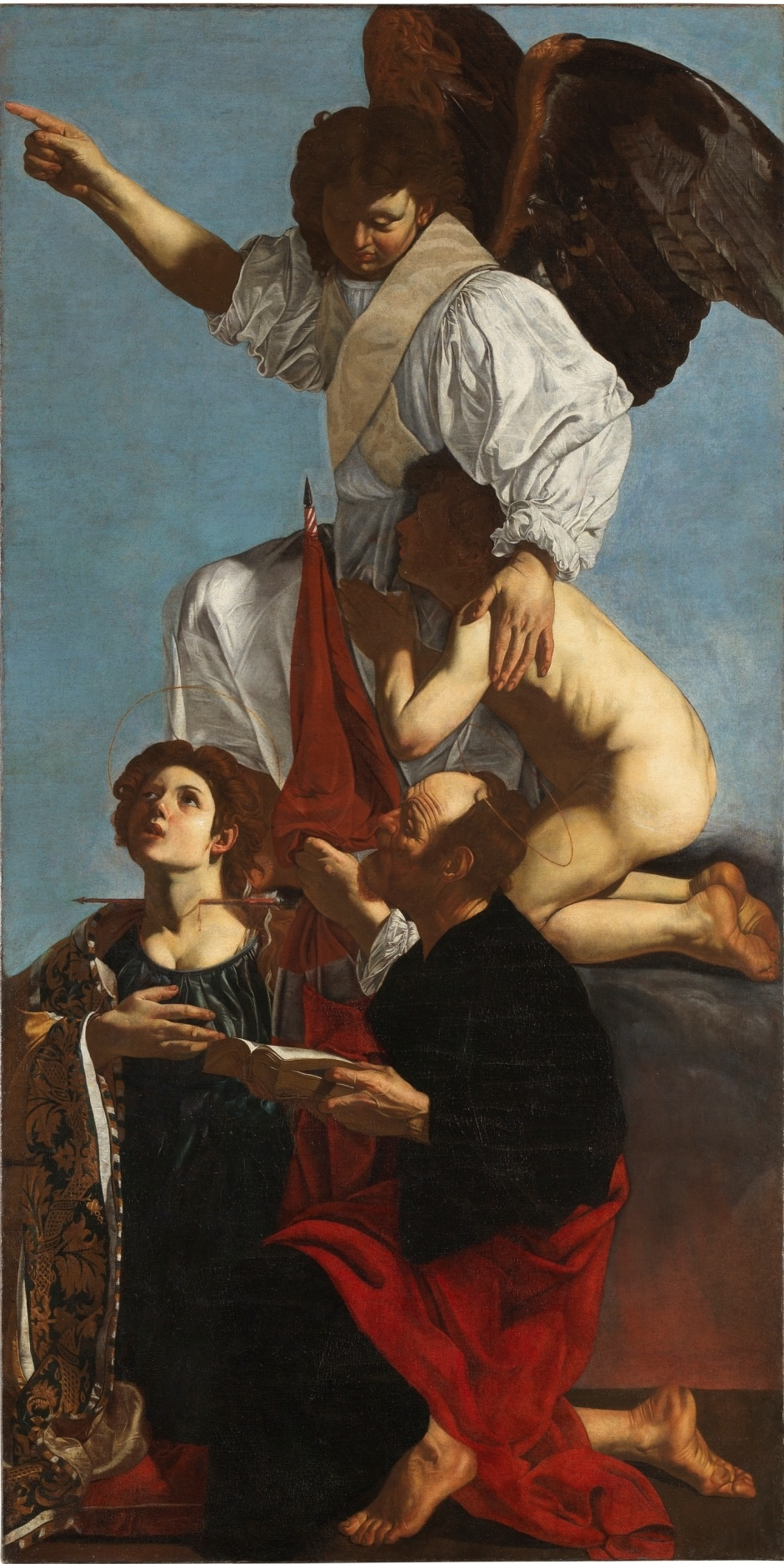
Guardian angel

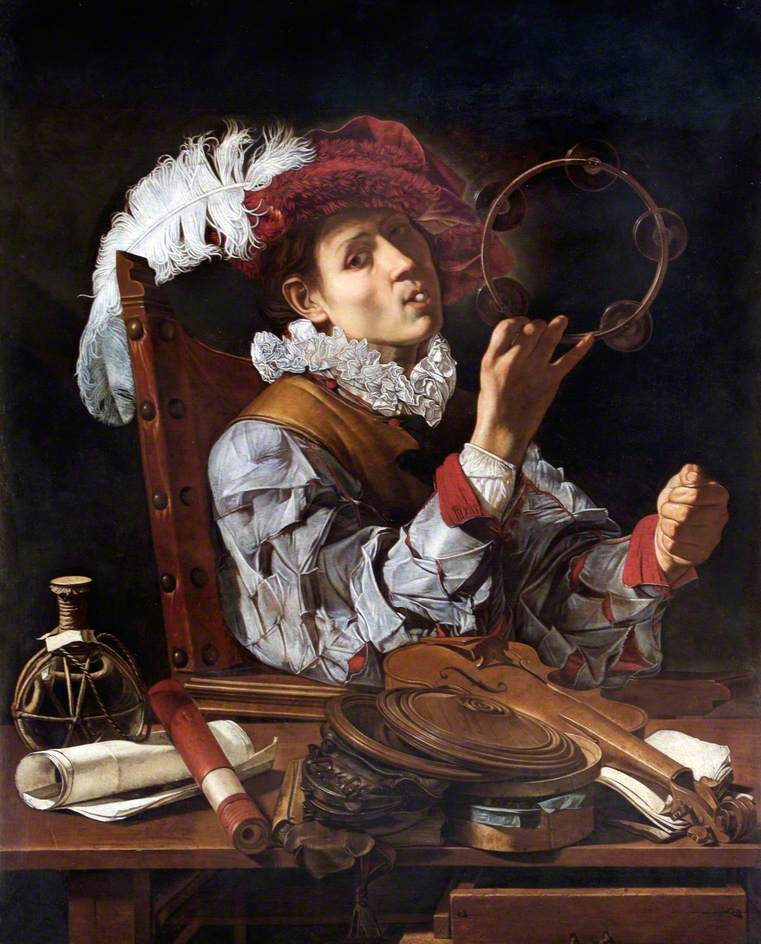
A musician

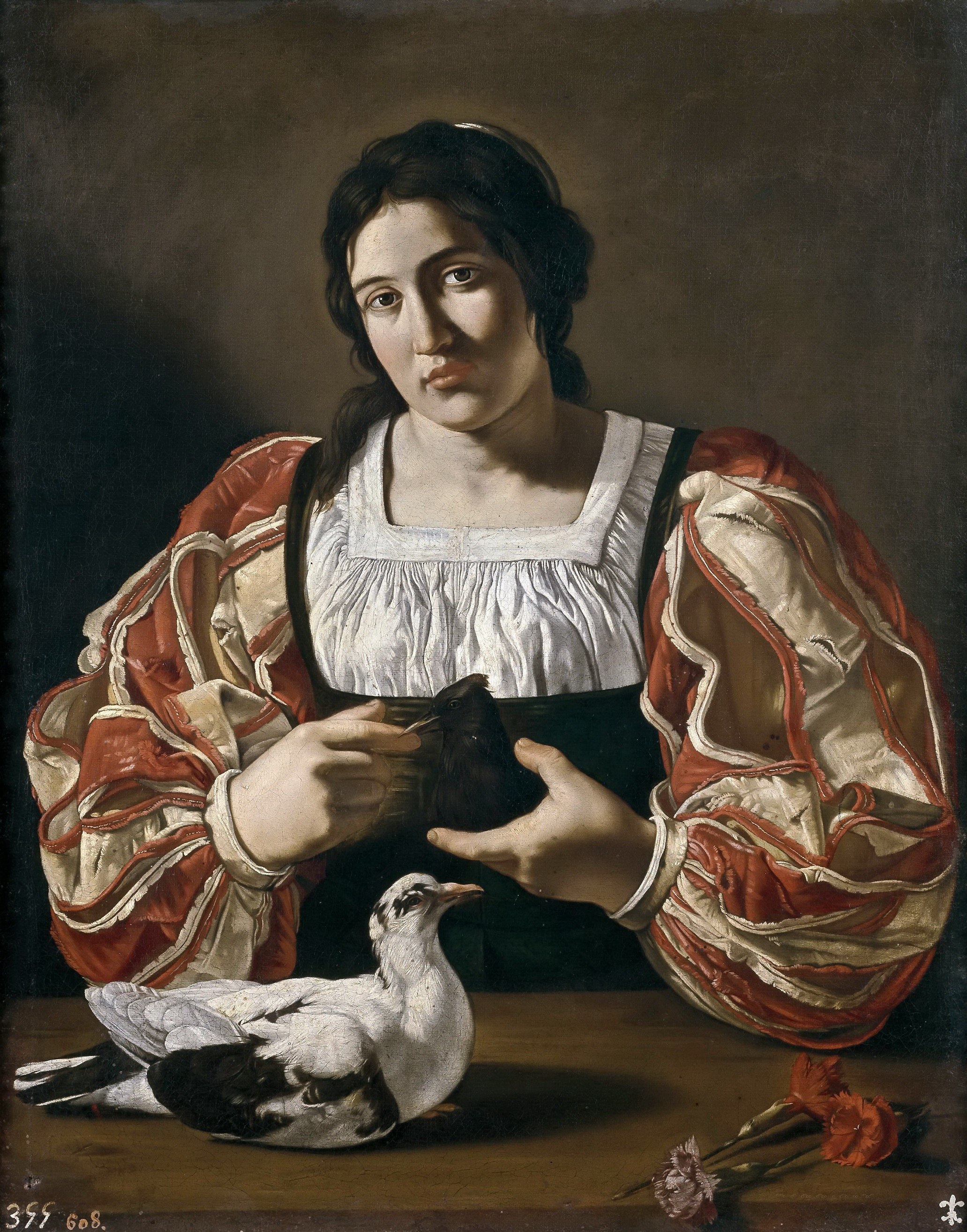
Woman with a Dove

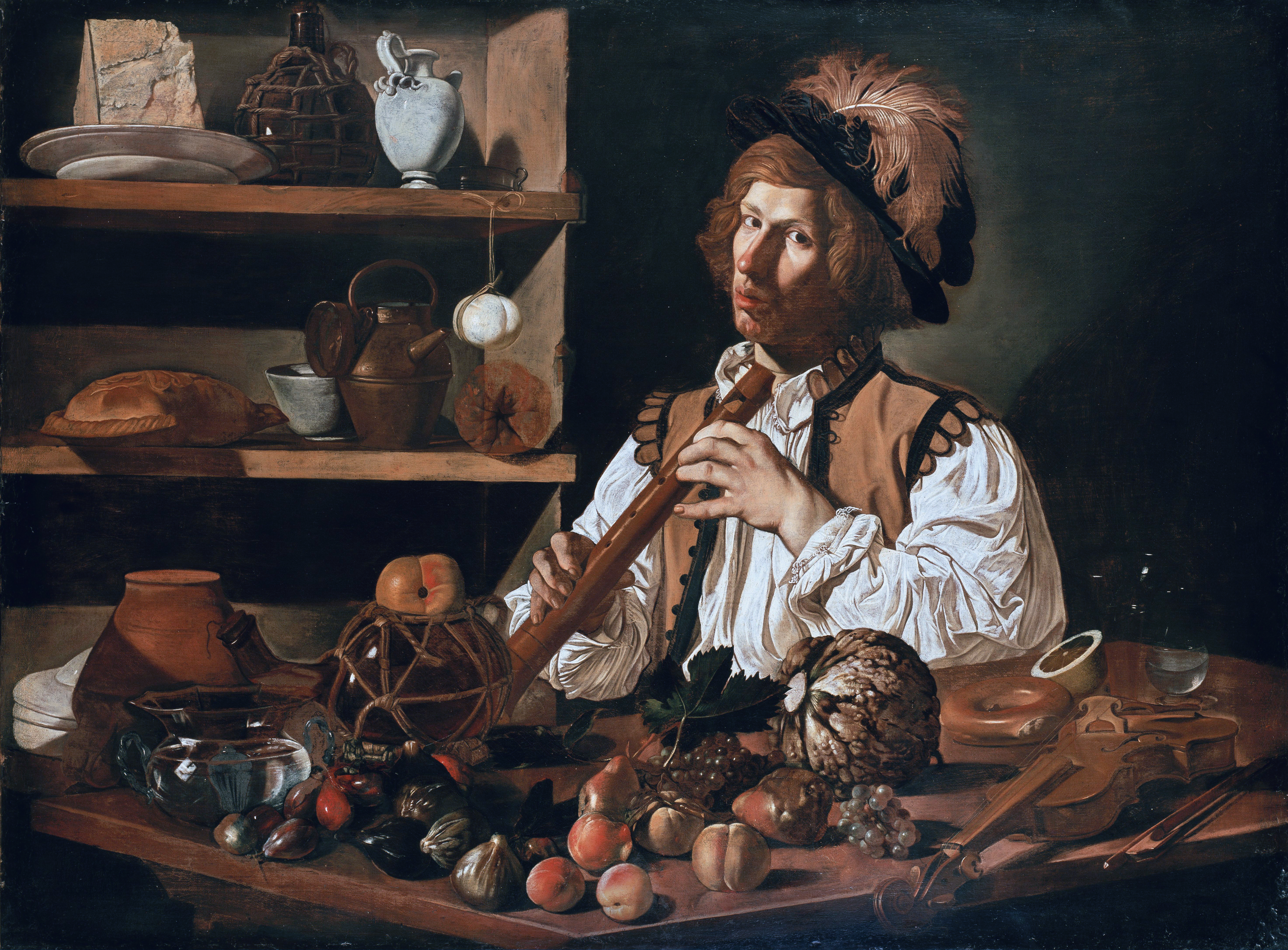
Fluteplayer

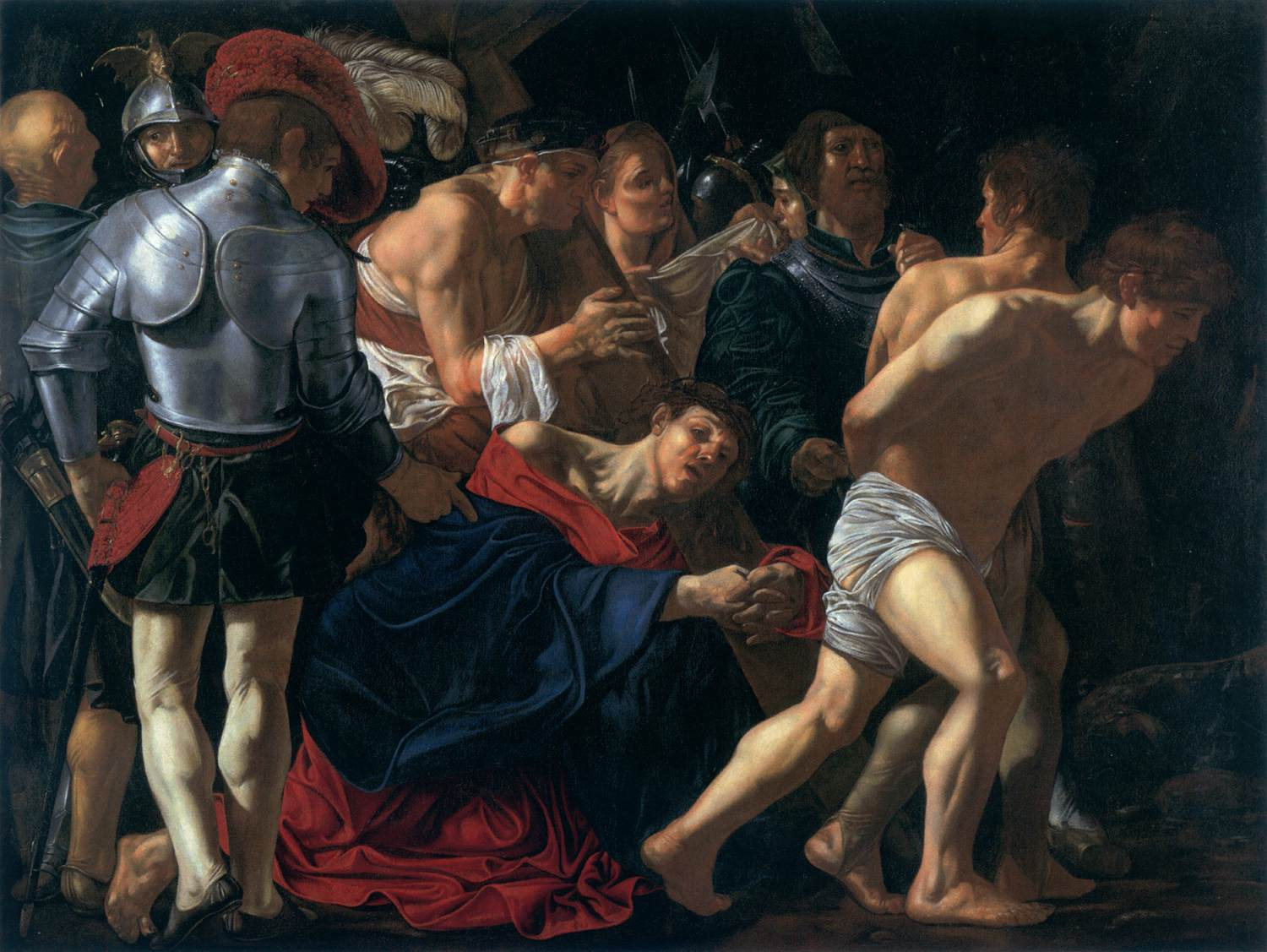
Christ falls on the road to Calvary

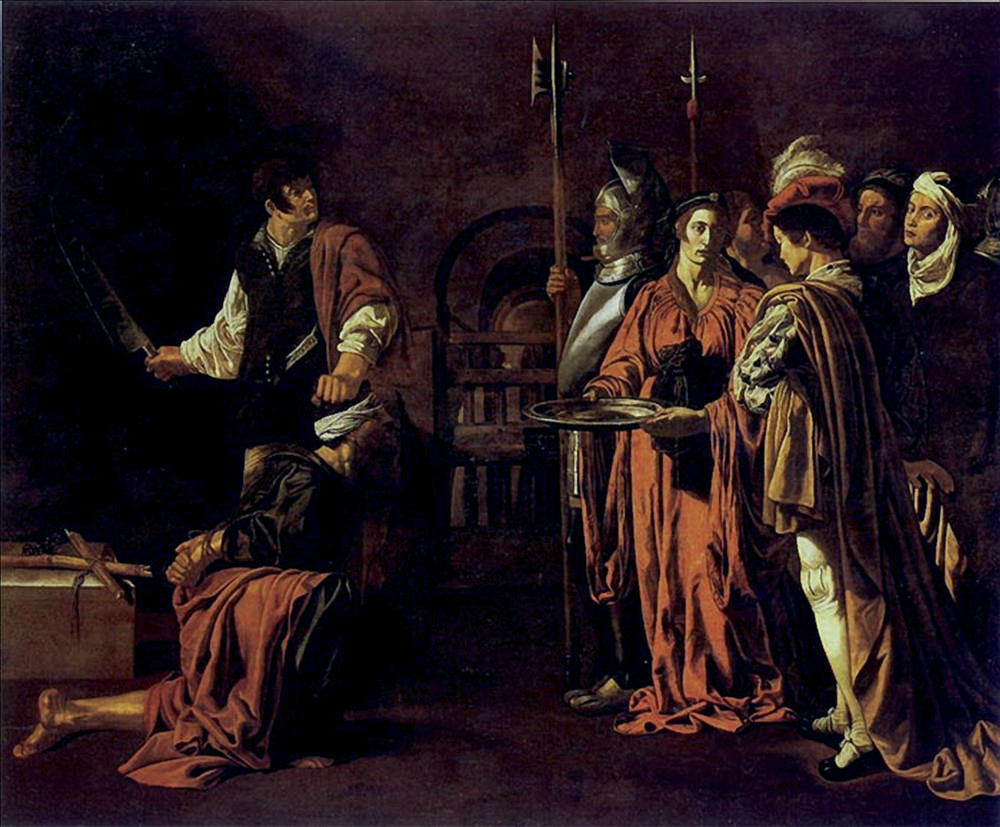
Beheading of St. John the Baptist
