= Francesco Brenti =

Italian painter

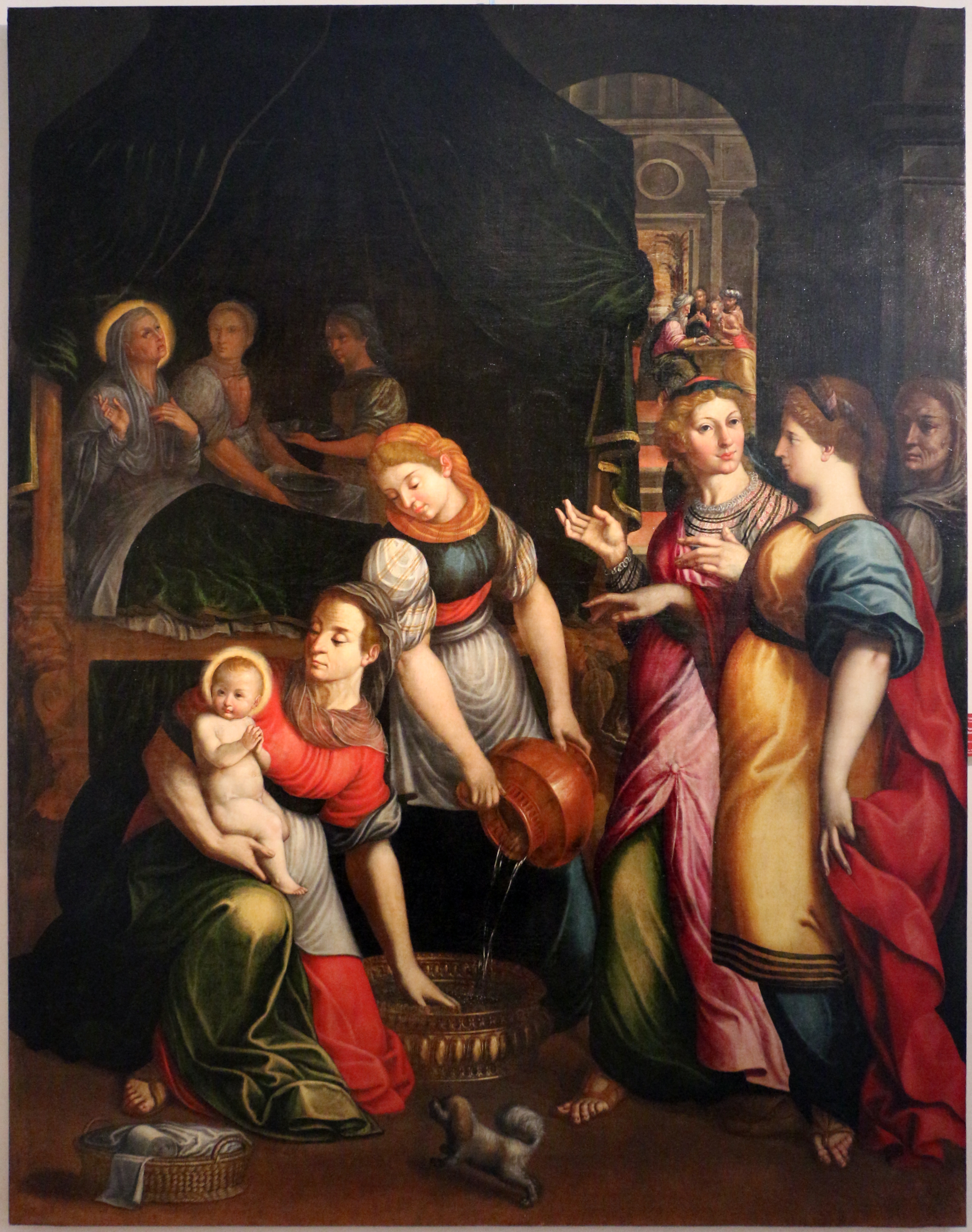
Nascita del Battista, circa 1610

Francesco Brenti was an Italian painter of the Mannerist style, active in Cremona 1612–1620. He appears to have trained with Giovanni Battista Trotti (il Malosso).
