= Andrea Giacomo Podesta =

Italian engraver and painter

Andrea Giacomo Podesta (1620 – after 1640) was an Italian engraver and painter. He was born at Genoa, and traveled as a young man to Rome to apprentice under Giovanni Andrea Ferrari. He is best known for engravings of paintings of past masters such as Titian and Annibale Carracci.
