= Domenico Vitus =

Domenico Vitus (c. 1536–?) was an Italian engraver. He is supposed to have studied engraving under Agostino Veneziano, whose style he imitated with some success. In the prime of life he retired to the monastery of Vallombrosa. Among his plates are the following: St. Bartholomew; inscribed "Dom. Vitis ordinis Valisumbrosae monachus excidit Romae (1576)"; St. Joachim holding a Censer after Andrea del Sarto; Jupiter and Callisto inscribed "Dominici V. F."; and a set of plates representing the Passion, the border ornamented with birds and beasts.
