= The Nun Jerónima de la Fuente =

1620 painting by Diego Velázquez

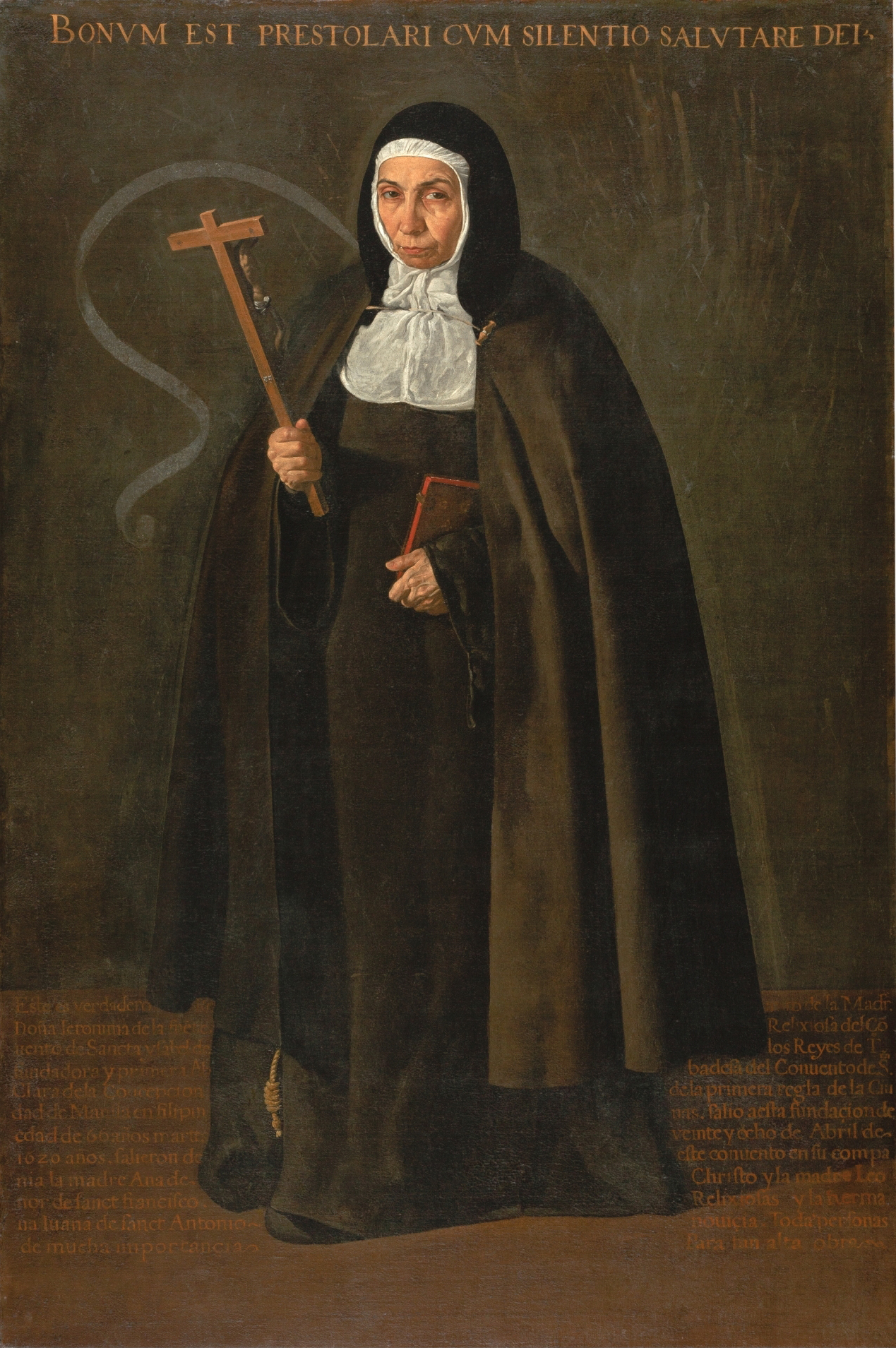
- Artist: Diego Velázquez
- Year: 1620
- Type: Oil on canvas
- Dimensions: 160 cm × 110 cm (63 in × 43 in)
- Location: Museo del Prado, Madrid, Spain
- Website: at Museo del Prado

The Nun Jerónima de la Fuente is a full-length portrait painting by Diego Velázquez depicting the titular nun. Velázquez painted Jerónima, which is in oil on canvas, in 1620. It is now on display at the Museo del Prado in Madrid, Spain.

== History ==
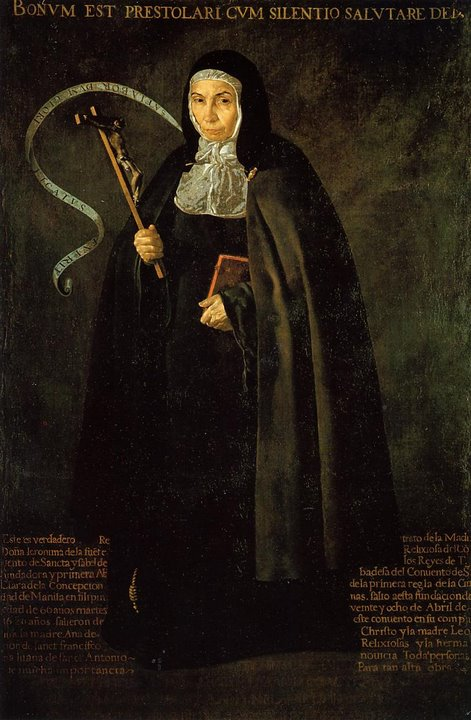
In the other version of the painting, which probably came later, the crucifix is more oblique. 1620; 162.5 × 105 cm; Fernandez de Araoz collection, Madrid.

First discovered at an exhibition in 1926, the painting was originally attributed to Luis Tristán. Upon restoration, however, Diego Velázquez's signature surfaced. Velázquez painted Jerónima in June 1620 during Jerónima de la Asunción's two-month stop-over in Seville, Spain en route to the Philippines. The painting was commissioned by one of the Franciscans accompanying Jerónima or Alvaro de Villegas, the vicar of the Santa Isabel convent in Toledo.

Jerónima is one of the earliest known portraits by Velázquez, and correspondingly one of the earliest records of the "growing cult" of Jerónima, who was "significantly more renowned" than Velázquez at the time of painting. Jerónima helped advance his reputation and significantly aided in his career; he would later become a court painter. The full-length portrait is now on display in Madrid's Museo del Prado, which acquired it from Santa Isabel in 1944. An almost identical copy of the painting remains in Toledo, whereas a half-length version of The Nun Jerónima de la Fuente, painted by either Velázquez or a disciple, is the property of an anonymous collector in Santiago de Chile.

== Description ==
Velázquez's portrait depicts Jeronima standing against a dark background while holding a small book in her left hand and grasping a wooden crucifix with her right hand. A capitalised quote from the Book of Lamentations 3:26, "Bonvm est prestolari cvm silentio salvtare dei" ("It is good to await the salvation of God in silence", ט֤וֹב וְיָחִיל֙ וְדוּמָ֔ם לִתְשׁוּעַ֖ת יְהֹוָֽה) is inscribed at the top of the portrait. Near the nun's mouth is a speech scroll bearing a modified Psalms verse, "Satiabor dvm glorificatvs fverit" ("I shall be satisfied as long as he is glorified"). At the bottom is a long caption that reads in Spanish: "This is the true portrait of Madre Donna Jerónima de la Fuente, religious of this convent of St. Isabel de los Reyes, of Toledo, Foundress and first Abbess of the convent of Sta. Clara de la Concepcion of the first Franciscan Order in the city of Manila, in the Philippine Islands. She set out to make this foundation at the age of 66 on Tuesday, 28 April 1620. Madre Ana de Cristo, Madre Leonor de Sanct Francisco, nuns, and Sor Juana de Sanct Antonio, novice, left in her company from this convent. All of them were persons of great importance for so eminent a work".

In painting Jerónima, Velázquez was heavily influenced by his father-in-law and mentor Francisco Pacheco. The painting is noted for its "tight brushstrokes" and "Caravaggiesque use of chiaroscuro with powerful characterizations and a crude light that unforgivingly emphasizes the irregularities of her face and hands", which reflects his preference for realism prior to his relocation to Madrid. The painting creates a "sacred image" that is "filled with truth while creating an exemplary model of sainthood". Velázquez also based his painting on several local depictions of Franciscan saints and other notable figures including Elizabeth of Portugal and Clare of Assisi, plus some of Pacheco's own paintings.

== Significance ==
Velázquez's painting is significant in detailing the nun's aged physical features while simultaneously capturing her sainthood. Vicente Carducho writes in his 1633 treatise on art, Diálogos de la Pintura, that Jerónima "evokes the legitimate love of parents, siblings, relatives, or friends" and would help ease the pain of absence felt by the "house of nuns" in Toledo. The religious imagery in Jerónima, in particular the presence of the crucifix, alludes to her "rigorous imitation of Christ's passion" – according to a fellow nun Ana, Jerónima would display "penitence with a cross", sometimes even to the extent of crucifying herself for hours. Similarly, the Latin inscriptions in the portrait reference her piousness and adherence to the Poor Clares' practice of not speaking excessively or unnecessarily. The depiction of Jerónima's well-documented and radical practice of self-mortification, however, is conspicuously left out in the portrait; contrary to contemporaneous accounts of the nun that speak of her "dry and denigrated" body "full of scars and wounds", Jerónima in Velázquez's portrait is not scarred or wounded. In fact, she is seen as "unscathed" and standing upright with an "unyielding" gaze, which reinforces her "authoritative presence".

== See also ==
- List of works by Diego Velázquez

== Bibliography ==
- Tiffany, Tanya J. (2012). Diego Velázquez's Early Paintings and the Culture of Seventeenth-century Seville. Penn State Press. ISBN 9780271053790.
