= Salvatore Castiglione =

Italian painter (1620–1676)

Salvatore Castiglione (21 April 1620 – 1676) was an Italian painter of the Baroque period. He was born in Genoa, the brother and pupil of Giovanni Benedetto Castiglione, and he painted landscapes and pastoral subjects. He also completed a highly finished etching representing the '’Resurrection of Lazarus’' (1645).

== Sources ==
- Bryan, Michael (1886). Robert Edmund Graves (ed.). Dictionary of Painters and Engravers, Biographical and Critical. Vol. I: A-K. London: George Bell and Sons. p. 251.

• Jaco Rutgers, 'Not Giovanni Benedetto but Salvatore Castiglione', Print Quarterly, vol. XXI, no. 2, June 2004, pp. 163–164.
