= Santo Rinaldi =

Italian painter (1620–1676)

Santo Rinaldi (1620–1676) was an Italian painter of the Baroque period. He was an excellent painter of battle scenes, landscapes, and architectural conceits (vedute). He was also called il Tromba. He was born at Florence and initially trained with Francesco Furini.
