= History of Ireland =

The first evidence of human presence in Ireland dates to around 34,000 years ago, with further findings dating the presence of Homo sapiens to 7,000 BC. The receding of the ice formed during the Younger Dryas cold phase of the Quaternary, around 9700 BC, heralds the beginning of Prehistoric Ireland, which includes the archaeological periods known as the Mesolithic, the Neolithic from about 4000 BC, and the Copper Age beginning around 2500 BC with the arrival of the Beaker Culture. The Irish Bronze Age proper begins around 2000 BC and ends with the arrival of the Iron Age of the Celtic Hallstatt culture, beginning about 600 BC. The subsequent La Tène culture brought new styles and practices by 300 BC.

Greek and Roman writers give some information about Ireland during the Classical period (see "protohistoric" period), by which time the island may be termed "Gaelic Ireland". By the late 4th century CE Christianity had begun to gradually subsume or replace the earlier Celtic polytheism. By the end of the 6th century, it had introduced writing along with a predominantly monastic Celtic Christian church, profoundly altering Irish society. Seafaring raiders and pirates from Scandinavia (later referred to as Vikings), settled from the late 8th century AD which resulted in extensive cultural interchange, as well as innovation in military and transport technology. Many of Ireland's towns were founded at this time as Scandinavian trading posts and coinage made its first appearance. Scandinavian penetration was limited and concentrated along coasts and rivers, and ceased to be a major threat to Gaelic culture after the Battle of Clontarf in 1014. The Norman invasion in 1169 resulted again in a partial conquest of the island and marked the beginning of more than 800 years of English political and military involvement in Ireland. Initially successful, Norman gains were rolled back over succeeding centuries as a Gaelic resurgence reestablished Gaelic cultural preeminence over most of the country, apart from the walled towns and the area around Dublin known as the Pale.

Reduced to the control of small pockets, the English Crown did not make another attempt to conquer the island until after the end of the Wars of the Roses (1488). This released resources and manpower for overseas expansion, beginning in the early 16th century. However, the nature of Ireland's decentralised political organisation into small territories (known as túatha), martial traditions, difficult terrain and climate and lack of urban infrastructure, meant that attempts to assert Crown authority were slow and expensive. Attempts to impose the new Protestant faith were also successfully resisted by both the Gaelic and Norman-Irish. The new policy fomented the rebellion of the Hiberno-Norman Earl of Kildare Silken Thomas in 1534, keen to defend his traditional autonomy and Catholicism, and marked the beginning of the prolonged Tudor conquest of Ireland lasting from 1536 to 1603. Henry VIII proclaimed himself King of Ireland in 1541 to facilitate the project. Ireland became a potential battleground in the wars between Catholic Counter-Reformation and Protestant Reformation Europe.

England's attempts either to conquer or to assimilate both the Hiberno-Norman lordships and the Gaelic territories into the Kingdom of Ireland provided the impetus for ongoing warfare, notable examples being the 1st Desmond Rebellion, the 2nd Desmond Rebellion and the Nine Years War. This period was marked by the Crown policies of, at first, surrender and regrant, and later, plantation, involving the arrival of thousands of English and Scottish Protestant settlers, and the displacement of both the Hiberno-Normans (or Old English as they were known by then) and the native Catholic landholders. With English colonies going back to the 1550s, Ireland was arguably the first English and then British territory colonised by a group known as the West Country Men. Gaelic Ireland was finally defeated at the battle of Kinsale in 1601 which marked the collapse of the Gaelic system and the beginning of Ireland's history as fully part of the English and later British Empire.

During the 17th century, this division between a Protestant landholding minority and a dispossessed Catholic majority was intensified and conflict between them was to become a recurrent theme in Irish history. Domination of Ireland by the Protestant Ascendancy was reinforced after two periods of religious war, the Irish Confederate Wars in 1641–52 and the Williamite war in 1689–91. Political power thereafter rested almost exclusively in the hands of a minority Protestant Ascendancy, while Catholics and members of dissenting Protestant denominations suffered severe political and economic privations under the Penal laws.

On 1 January 1801, in the wake of the republican United Irishmen Rebellion, the Irish Parliament was abolished and Ireland became part of a new United Kingdom of Great Britain and Ireland formed by the Acts of Union 1800. Catholics were not granted full rights until Catholic emancipation in 1829, achieved by Daniel O'Connell. The Great Famine struck Ireland in 1845 resulting in over a million deaths from starvation and disease and a million refugees fleeing the country, mainly to America. Irish attempts to break away continued with Parnell's Irish Parliamentary Party which strove from the 1880s to attain Home Rule through the parliamentary constitutional movement, eventually winning the Home Rule Act 1914, although this Act was suspended at the outbreak of World War I. In 1916, the Easter Rising succeeded in turning public opinion against the British establishment after the execution of the leaders by British authorities. It also eclipsed the home rule movement. In 1922, after the Irish War of Independence, most of Ireland seceded from the United Kingdom to become the independent Irish Free State, but under the Anglo-Irish Treaty the six northeastern counties, known as Northern Ireland, remained within the United Kingdom, creating the partition of Ireland. The treaty was opposed by many; their opposition led to the outbreak of the Irish Civil War, in which Irish Free State, or "pro-treaty", forces proved victorious.

The history of Northern Ireland has since been dominated by the division of society along sectarian faultlines and conflict between (mainly Catholic) Irish nationalists and (mainly Protestant) British unionists. These divisions erupted into the Troubles in the late 1960s, after civil rights marches were met with opposition by authorities. The violence escalated after the deployment of the British Army to maintain authority led to clashes with nationalist communities. The violence continued for twenty-eight years until an uneasy, but largely successful peace was finally achieved with the Good Friday Agreement in 1998.

== Prehistory (10,500 BC–600 BC) ==
=== Stone Age to Bronze Age ===
Ireland during the Ice Age

What is known of pre-Christian Ireland comes from references in Roman writings, Irish poetry, myth, and archaeology. While some possible Paleolithic tools have been found, none of the finds are convincing of Paleolithic settlement in Ireland. However a bear bone found in Alice and Gwendoline Cave, County Clare, in 1903 may push back dates for the earliest human settlement of Ireland to 10,500 BC. The bone shows clear signs of cut marks with stone tools and has been radiocarbon dated to 12,500 years ago.

It is possible that humans crossed a land bridge during the warm period, referred to as the Bølling–Allerød warming, that lasted between 14,700 and 12,700 years ago (i.e. between 12,700 BC and 10,700 BC) towards the end of the last ice age, and allowed the reinhabitation of northern Europe. A sudden return to freezing conditions known as the Younger Dryas cold phase, which lasted from 10,900 BC to 9700 BC, may have depopulated Ireland. During the Younger Dryas, sea levels continued to rise and no ice-free land bridge between Great Britain and Ireland ever returned.

The earliest confirmed inhabitants of Ireland were Mesolithic hunter-gatherers, who arrived sometime around 7900 BC. While some authors take the view that a land bridge connecting Ireland to Great Britain still existed at that time, more recent studies indicate that Ireland was separated from Britain by c. 14,000 BC when the climate was still cold and local ice caps persisted in parts of the country. The people remained hunter-gatherers until about 4000 BC. It is argued this is when the first signs of agriculture started to show, leading to the establishment of a Neolithic culture, characterised by the appearance of pottery, polished stone tools, rectangular wooden houses, megalithic tombs, and domesticated sheep and cattle. Some of these tombs, as at Knowth and Dowth, are huge stone monuments and many of them, such as the Passage Tombs of Newgrange, are astronomically aligned. Four main types of Irish Megalithic Tombs have been identified: dolmens, court cairns, passage tombs and wedge-shaped gallery graves. In Leinster and Munster, individual adult males were buried in small stone structures, called cists, under earthen mounds and were accompanied by distinctive decorated pottery. This culture apparently prospered, and the island became more densely populated. Near the end of the Neolithic new types of monuments developed, such as circular embanked enclosures and timber, stone and post and pit circles.

The Céide Fields is an archaeological site on the north County Mayo coast in the west of Ireland, about 7 kilometres northwest of Ballycastle, and the site is the most extensive Neolithic site in Ireland and contains the oldest known field systems in the world. Using various dating methods, it was discovered that the creation and development of the Céide Fields goes back some five and a half thousand years (~3500 BC).

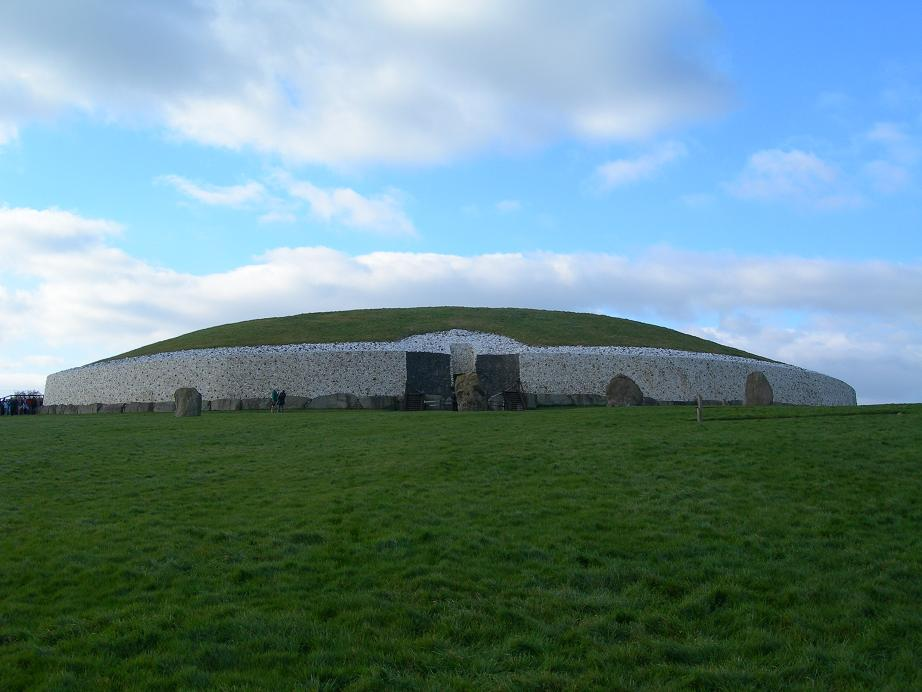
Newgrange, built c. 3200 BC, is an Irish passage tomb located at Brú na Bóinne.

The short-lived Irish Copper Age and subsequent Bronze Age, which came to Ireland around 2000 BC, saw the production of elaborate gold and bronze ornaments, weapons and tools. There was a movement away from the construction of communal megalithic tombs to the burial of the dead in small stone cists or simple pits, which could be situated in cemeteries or in circular earth or stone-built burial mounds known respectively as barrows and cairns. As the period progressed, inhumation burial gave way to cremation and by the Middle Bronze Age, remains were often placed beneath large burial urns. During the late Bronze Age, there was an increase in stored weapons, which has been taken as evidence for greater warfare. Fleshed bog bodies also appear at this time, continuing into the Iron Age.

== Iron Age (600 BC–400 AD) ==
The Iron Age in Ireland began about 600 BC. The period between the start of the Iron Age and the historic period (AD 431) saw the gradual infiltration of small groups of Celtic-speaking people into Ireland, with items of the continental Celtic La Tene style being found in at least the northern part of the island by about 300 BC. The result of a gradual blending of Celtic and indigenous cultures would result in the emergence of Gaelic culture by the fifth century. It is also during the fifth century that the main over-kingdoms of in Tuisceart, Airgialla, Ulaid, Mide, Laigin, Mumhain, Cóiced Ol nEchmacht began to emerge (see Kingdoms of ancient Ireland). Within these kingdoms, a rich culture flourished. The society of these kingdoms was dominated by an upper class consisting of aristocratic warriors and learned people, which possibly included Druids.

Linguists realised from the 17th century onwards that the language spoken by these people, the Goidelic languages, was a branch of the Celtic languages. This is usually explained as a result of invasions by Celts from the continent. However, other research has postulated that the culture developed gradually and continuously and that the introduction of Celtic language and elements of Celtic culture may have been a result of cultural exchange with Celtic groups in southwest continental Europe from the Neolithic to the Bronze Age.

The hypothesis that the native Late Bronze Age inhabitants gradually absorbed Celtic influences has since been supported by some recent genetic research.

In 60 AD, it is said that the Romans invaded Anglesey in Wales causing concerns across the Irish Sea, but there is a small controversy on if they even set foot into Ireland. The closest Rome got to conquering Ireland was in 80 AD, when, according to Turtle Bunbury from the Irish Times, "Túathal Techtmar, the son of a deposed high king, who is said to have invaded Ireland from afar in order to regain his kingdom at about this time".

The Romans referred to Ireland as Hibernia around AD 100. Ptolemy, in AD 100, recorded Ireland's geography and tribes. Ireland was never a part of the Roman Empire, but Roman influence was often projected well beyond its borders. Tacitus writes that an exiled Irish prince was with Agricola in Roman Britain and would return to seize power in Ireland. Juvenal tells us that Roman "arms had been taken beyond the shores of Ireland". In recent years, some experts have hypothesized that Roman-sponsored Gaelic forces (or perhaps even Roman regulars) mounted some kind of invasion around CE 100, but the exact relationship between Rome and the dynasties and peoples of Hibernia remains unclear.

Irish confederations (the Scoti) attacked and some settled in Britain during the Great Conspiracy of 367. In particular, the Dál Riata settled in western Scotland and the Western Isles.

== Early Christian Ireland (400–795) ==
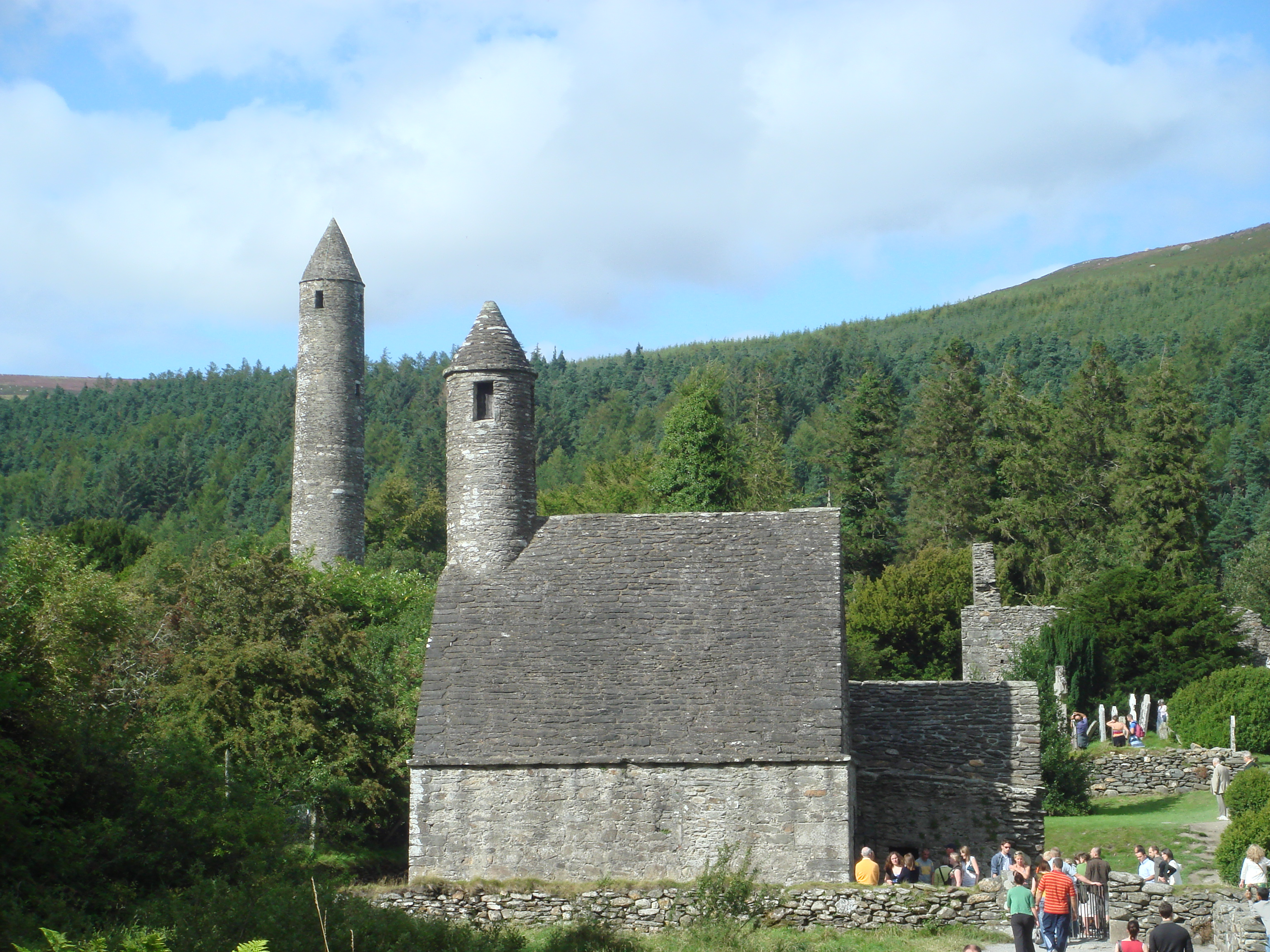
Kevin's monastery at Glendalough, County Wicklow

The middle centuries of the first millennium AD marked great changes in Ireland. Politically, what appears to have been a prehistoric emphasis on tribal affiliation had been replaced by the 8th century by patrilineal dynasties ruling the island's kingdoms. Many formerly powerful kingdoms and peoples disappeared. Irish pirates struck all over the coast of western Britain in the same way that the Vikings would later attack Ireland. Some of these founded entirely new kingdoms in Pictland and, to a lesser degree, in parts of Cornwall, Wales, and Cumbria. The Attacotti of south Leinster may even have served in the Roman military in the mid-to-late 300s.

Perhaps it was some of the latter returning home as rich mercenaries, merchants, or wealth in the form of enslaved people stolen from Britain or Gaul, who first brought the Christian faith to Ireland. Some early sources claim that there were missionaries active in southern Ireland long before Saint Patrick. Whatever the route, and there were probably many, this new faith was to have the most profound effect on the Irish.

Tradition maintains that in A.D. 432, St. Patrick arrived on the island and, in the years that followed, worked to convert the Irish to Christianity. St Patrick's Confession, in Latin, written by him is the earliest Irish historical document. It gives some information about the Saint. On the other hand, according to Prosper of Aquitaine, a contemporary chronicler, Palladius was sent to Ireland by the Pope in 431 as "first Bishop to the Irish believing in Christ", which demonstrates that there were already Christians living in Ireland. Palladius seems to have worked purely as Bishop to Irish Christians in the Leinster and Meath kingdoms, while Patrick – who may have arrived as late as 461 – worked first and foremost as a missionary to the pagan Irish, in the more remote kingdoms ruled by Niall of the Nine Hostages.

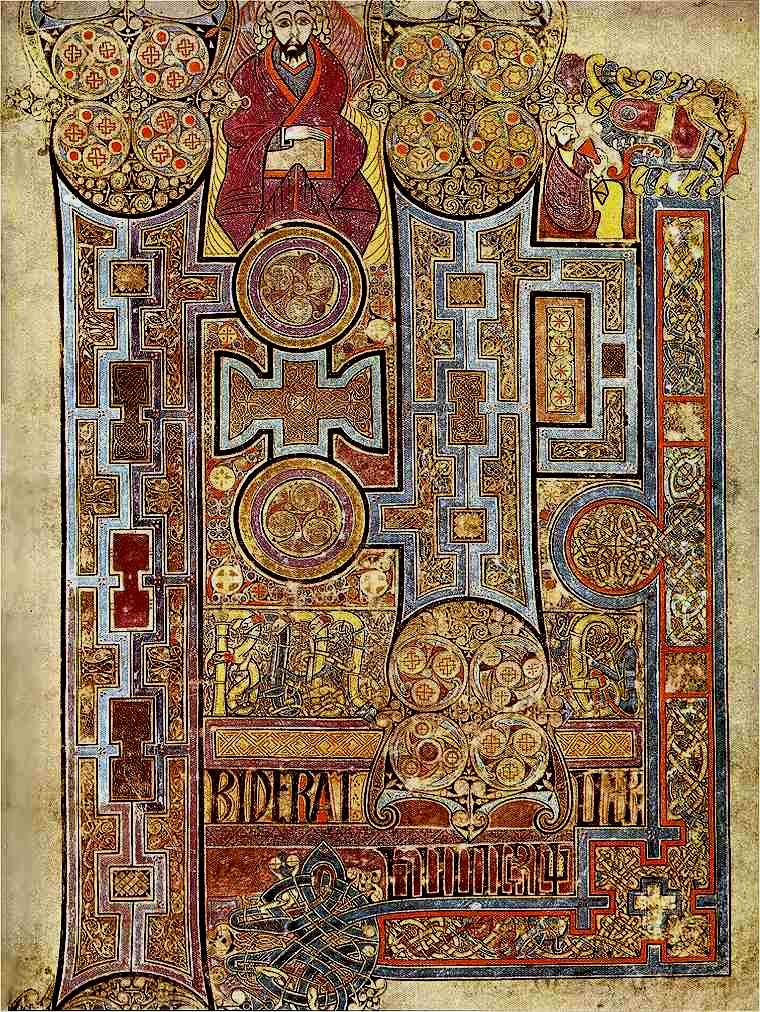
A page from the Book of Kells that opens the Gospel of John

Patrick is traditionally credited with preserving and codifying Irish laws and changing only those that conflicted with Christian practices. He is credited with introducing the Roman alphabet, which enabled Irish monks to preserve parts of the extensive oral literature. The historicity of these claims remains the subject of debate and there is no direct evidence linking Patrick with any of these accomplishments. The myth of Patrick, as scholars refer to it, was developed in the centuries after his death.

Irish scholars excelled in the study of Latin learning and Christian theology in the monasteries that flourished shortly thereafter. Missionaries from Ireland to England and Continental Europe spread the news of the flowering of learning, and scholars from other nations came to Irish monasteries. The excellence and isolation of these monasteries helped preserve Latin learning during the Early Middle Ages. The period of Insular art, mainly in the fields of illuminated manuscripts, metalworking, and sculpture flourished and produced such treasures as the Book of Kells, the Ardagh Chalice, and the many carved stone crosses that dot the island. Insular style was to be a crucial ingredient in the formation of the Romanesque and Gothic styles throughout Western Europe. Sites dating to this period include clochans, ringforts and promontory forts.

Francis John Byrne describes the effect of the epidemics which occurred during this era:

The plagues of the 660s and the 680s had a traumatic effect on Irish society. The golden age of the saints was over, together with the generation of kings who could fire a saga-writer's imagination. The literary tradition looks back to the reign of the sons of Aed Slaine (Diarmait and Blathmac, who died in 665) as to the end of an era. Antiquaries, brehons, genealogists and hagiographers, felt the need to collect ancient traditions before they were totally forgotten. Many were in fact swallowed by oblivion; when we examine the writing of Tirechan we encounter obscure references to tribes that are quite unknown to the later genealogical tradition. The laws describe a ... society that was obsolescent, and the meaning and use of the word moccu dies out with archaic Old Irish at the beginning of the new century.

The first English involvement in Ireland took place in this period. Tullylease, Rath Melsigi and Maigh Eo na Saxain were founded by 670 for English students who wished to study or live in Ireland. In summer 684, an English expeditionary force sent by Northumbrian King Ecgfrith raided Brega.

== Early medieval and Viking era (795–1169) ==
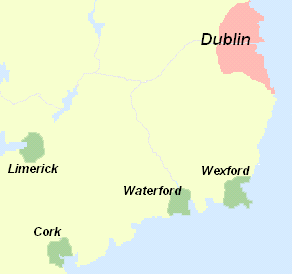
Map showing the Viking settlements in Ireland

The first recorded Viking raid in Irish history occurred in 795 AD when Vikings from Norway looted the island. Early Viking raids were generally fast-paced and small in scale. These early raids interrupted the golden age of Christian Irish culture and marked the beginning of two centuries of intermittent warfare, with waves of Viking raiders plundering monasteries and towns throughout Ireland. Most of those early raiders came from western Norway.

The Vikings were expert sailors, who travelled in longships, and by the early 840s, had begun to establish settlements along the Irish coasts and to spend the winter months there. The longships were technologically advanced, allowing them to travel faster through the narrow rivers. Vikings founded settlements in several places; most famously in Dublin. Most of the settlements were near the water, allowing the Vikings to trade using their longships. Written accounts from this time (early to mid 840s) show that the Vikings were moving further inland to attack (often using rivers) and then retreating to their coastal headquarters.

In 852, the Vikings landed in Dublin Bay and established a fortress. Dublin became the centre for the trade of many goods like raw materials, luxury items, precious metals, weapons, horses, and enslaved people. Bringing back new ideas and motivations, they began settling more permanently. In the tenth century, an earthen bank was constructed around the city with a second larger bank built outside that in the eleventh century. On the interior of the town, an extensive series of defences have been excavated at Fishamble Street, Dublin. The site featured nine waterfronts, including two possible flood banks and two positive defensive embankments during the Viking Age. The early embankments were non-defensive, being only one metre high, and it is uncertain how much of the site they encircled. After several generations a group of mixed Irish and Norse ethnic background arose, the Gall-Gaels, '(Gall being the Old Irish word for foreign).

The second wave of Vikings made stations at winter bases called longphorts to serve as control centres to exert a more localized force on the island through raiding. The third wave in 917 established towns as not only control centres, but also as centres of trade to enter into Irish economy and greater Western Europe. Returning to Dublin, they set up a market town. Over the next century, a great period of economic growth would spread across the pastoral country. The Vikings brought Ireland into their wide-ranging system of international trade, as well as popularizing a silver-based economy with local trade and the first minting of coins in 997.

In 902 Máel Finnia mac Flannacain of Brega and Cerball mac Muirecáin of Leinster joined forces against Dublin, and "The heathens were driven from Ireland, i.e. from the fortress of Áth Cliath [Dublin]". (Note: AU 902.2 Note that the untranslated text reads: "Indarba n-gennti a h-Ere, .í. longport Atha Cliath o Mael Findia m. Flandacain co feraibh Bregh & o Cerball m. Muiricain co Laignibh...", that is "longport", not "fortress".) They were allowed by the Saxons to settle in Wirral, England, but would however later return to retake Dublin.

The Vikings never achieved total domination of Ireland, often fighting for and against various Irish kings. The great High King of Ireland, Brian Boru, defeated the Vikings at the Battle of Clontarf in 1014 which began the decline of Viking power in Ireland, but the towns which Vikings had founded continued to flourish, and trade became an important part of the Irish economy.

Brian Boru, though he did not succeed in unifying Ireland, changed the High Kingship in the way that the High King would now have more power and control over the country and could manage the country's affairs. This led to prosperity for Ireland over the next few years. The Irish economy grew as international trade became more common. The towns founded by the Vikings continued to grow and thrive as centres of Irish trade and finance. They remain so to this day.

Despite the breaking of Norse power in Ireland, the Norse still maintained control of the Kingdom of Dublin. Although the King of Leinster levied tribute from the Norse, they rarely directly intervened in the affairs of the city-state, as it brought trade to the area. This changed, however, when Diarmuit mac Maél na mBó, King of Leinster, captured Dublin in 1052. This gave the Irish greater access to the Kingdom of the Isles. Diarmuit was able to become High King of Ireland, and after his death, the O'Brien dynasty, who ruled Ireland since the days of Brian Boru, reclaimed the High Kingship and Irish influence in the Irish Sea area would increase dramatically over the next few decades, notably under High King Muircherteach Ua Briain, who was noted for his interest in foreign affairs.

Perhaps it was Muircherteach's increasing power in the Isles that led Magnus Barefoot, King of Norway, to lead campaigns against the Irish in 1098 and again in 1102 to bring Norse areas back under Norwegian control, while also raiding the various British kingdoms. Although direct conflict with the Kingdom of Norway seemed imminent, the two Kings formed an alliance by the marriage of Muircherteach's daughter to Magnus' son. The two would campaign together in Ulster, until Magnus was killed in an ambush by the Ulaid in August 1103, under mysterious circumstances (it is possible Muircherteach ordered his killing). Muircherteach was also politically involved in the Kingdoms of Scotland and England, as well as Wales.

One of the most prosperous reigns of any High King was the reign of Toirdelbach Ua Conchobhair, who had overthrown Muircherteach and partitioned Munster in 1118. As King of Connacht and then King of Ireland, Ireland underwent a period of modernization and elevation on the European stage. Under his rule, the first castles in Ireland were built bringing improved defence and brought a new aspect to Irish warfare. He also built a naval base and castle at Dún Gaillimhe. A settlement grew around this castle which would grow to be the city of Galway today. He was a superb military commander and this allowed him to keep control of Ireland, with the help of the castles he built and his fleet based at Dún Gaillimhe. He also had commercial and political links with the rulers of France, Spain and England, increasing Ireland's international presence which brought more trade to the island. His reign lasted more than 50 years.

One of Tairrdelbach's sons, Ruadhrí, would later go on to be High King himself. He was arguably the first High King without opposition, however, he would later abdicate following the Anglo-Norman invasion of Ireland.

== Anglo-Norman Ireland (1169–1536) ==
=== Arrival of the Normans ===
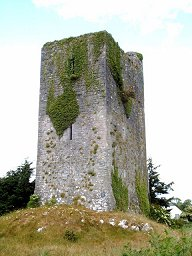
A tower house near Quin, County Clare. The Normans consolidated their presence in Ireland by building hundreds of castles and towers such as this.

By the 12th century, Ireland was divided politically into shifting petty kingdoms and over-kingdoms. Power was exercised by the heads of a few regional dynasties vying against each other for supremacy over the whole island. One of these men, King Diarmait Mac Murchada of Leinster was forcibly exiled by the new High King, Ruaidri mac Tairrdelbach Ua Conchobair of the Western kingdom of Connacht. Fleeing to Aquitaine, Diarmait obtained permission from Henry II to recruit Norman knights to regain his kingdom. The first Norman knights landed in Ireland in 1167, followed by the main forces of Normans, Welsh and Flemings. Several counties were restored to the control of Diarmait, who named his son-in-law, the Norman Richard de Clare, known as Strongbow, heir to his kingdom. This troubled King Henry, who feared the establishment of a rival Norman state in Ireland. Accordingly, he resolved to establish his authority. In 1177, Prince John Lackland was made Lord of Ireland by his father Henry II of England at the Council of Oxford.

With the authority of the papal bull Laudabiliter from Adrian IV, Henry landed with a large fleet at Waterford in 1171, becoming the first King of England to set foot on Irish soil. Henry awarded his Irish territories to his younger son John with the title Dominus Hiberniae ("Lord of Ireland"). When John unexpectedly succeeded his brother as King John of England, the "Lordship of Ireland" fell directly under the English Crown.

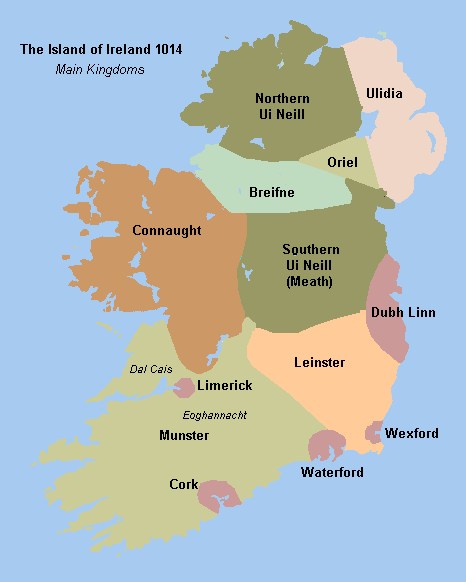
Ireland in 1014: a patchwork of rival kingdoms

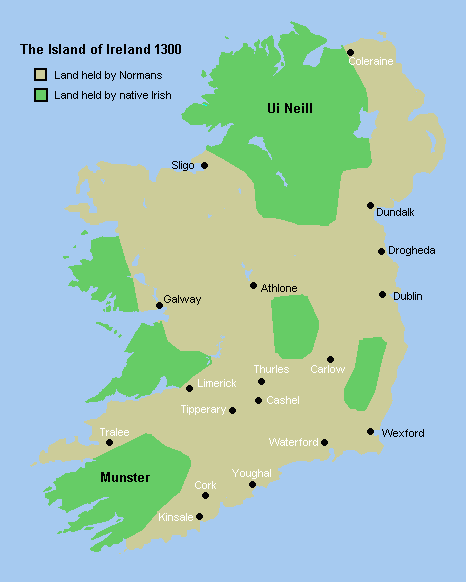
The extent of Norman control of Ireland in 1300

=== Lordship of Ireland ===
The Normans initially controlled the entire east coast, from Waterford to eastern Ulster, and penetrated a considerable distance inland as well. The counties were ruled by many smaller kings. The first Lord of Ireland was King John, who visited Ireland in 1185 and 1210 and helped consolidate the Norman-controlled areas while ensuring that the many Irish kings swore fealty to him.

Throughout the thirteenth century, the policy of the English Kings was to weaken the power of the Norman Lords in Ireland. For example, King John encouraged Hugh de Lacy to destabilise and then overthrow the Lord of Ulster, before naming him as the first Earl of Ulster. The Hiberno-Norman community suffered from a series of invasions that ceased the spread of their settlement and power. Politics and events in Gaelic Ireland served to draw the settlers deeper into the orbit of the Irish. Furthermore, unlike the Anglo-Normans, the Gaelic kings did not keep detailed estate inventories and accounts. Coupled with the absence of archaeological evidence to the contrary, this has tempted many scholars of medieval western Ireland to agree with the twelfth-century historian Giraldus Cambrensis who argued that the Gaelic kings did not build castles.

=== Gaelic resurgence and Norman decline ===
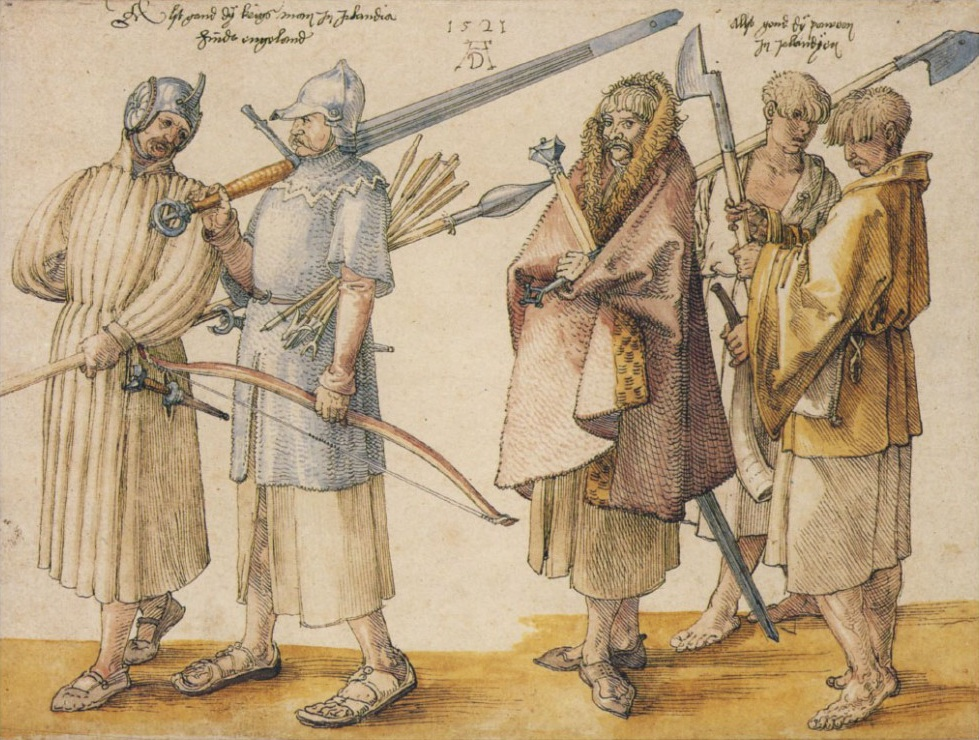
Irish soldiers, 1521 – by Albrecht Dürer.

By 1261 the weakening of the Normans had become manifest when Fineen MacCarthy defeated a Norman army at the Battle of Callann. The war continued between the different lords and earls for about 100 years, causing much destruction, especially around Dublin. In this chaotic situation, local Irish lords won back large amounts of land that their families had lost since the conquest and held them after the war was over.

The Black Death arrived in Ireland in 1348. Because most of the English and Norman inhabitants of Ireland lived in towns and villages, the plague hit them far harder than it did the native Irish, who lived in more dispersed rural settlements. After it had passed, Gaelic Irish language and customs came to dominate the country again. The English-controlled territory shrank to a fortified area around Dublin (the Pale), whose rulers had little real authority outside (beyond the Pale).

By the end of the 15th century, central English authority in Ireland had all but disappeared. England's attentions were diverted by the Wars of the Roses. The Lordship of Ireland lay in the hands of the powerful Fitzgerald Earl of Kildare, who dominated the country by means of military force and alliances with Irish lords and clans. Around the country, local Gaelic and Gaelicised lords expanded their powers at the expense of the English government in Dublin but the power of the Dublin government was in any case seriously curtailed by the introduction of Poynings' Law in 1494. According to this act, the Irish Parliament was essentially put under the control of the Westminster Parliament.

== Early modern Ireland (1536–1691) ==
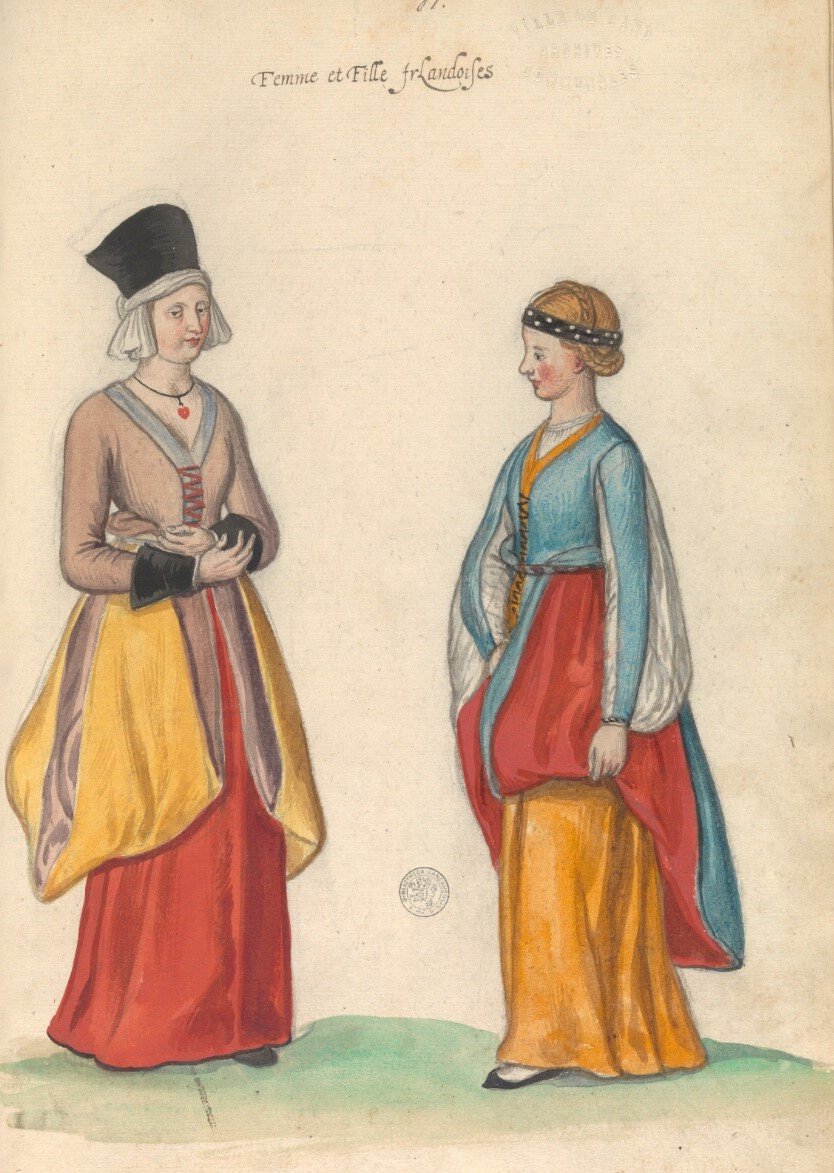
A 16th century perception of Irish women and girls, illustrated in the manuscript "Théâtre de tous les peuples et nations de la terre avec leurs habits et ornemens divers, tant anciens que modernes, diligemment depeints au naturel". Painted by Lucas d'Heere in the 2nd half of the 16th century. Preserved in the Ghent University Library.

=== Conquest and rebellion ===
From 1536, Henry VIII of England decided to reconquer Ireland and bring it under crown control. The Fitzgerald dynasty of Kildare, who had become the effective rulers of Ireland in the 15th century, had become unreliable allies of the Tudor monarchs. They had invited Burgundian troops into Dublin to crown the Yorkist pretender, Lambert Simnel as King of England in 1487. Again in 1536, Silken Thomas went into open rebellion against the crown. Having put down this rebellion, Henry resolved to bring Ireland under English government control so the island would not become a base for future rebellions or foreign invasions of England. In 1542, he upgraded Ireland from a lordship to a full kingdom. Henry was proclaimed King of Ireland at a meeting of the Irish Parliament that year. This was the first meeting of the Irish Parliament to be attended by the Gaelic Irish chieftains as well as the Hiberno-Norman aristocracy. With the institutions of government in place, the next step was to extend the control of the English Kingdom of Ireland over all of its claimed territory. This took nearly a century, with various English administrations either negotiating or fighting with the independent Irish and Old English lords. The Spanish Armada in Ireland suffered heavy losses during an extraordinary season of storms in the autumn of 1588. Among the survivors was Captain Francisco de Cuellar, who gave a remarkable account of his experiences on the run in Ireland.

The re-conquest was completed during the reigns of Elizabeth and James I, after several brutal conflicts. (See the Desmond Rebellions, 1569–73 and 1579–83, and the Nine Years' War, 1594–1603, for details.) After this point, the English authorities in Dublin established real control over Ireland for the first time, bringing a centralised government to the entire island, and successfully disarmed the native lordships. In 1614 the Catholic majority in the Irish Parliament was overthrown through the creation of numerous new boroughs which were dominated by the new settlers. However, the English were not successful in converting the Catholic Irish to the Protestant religion and the brutal methods used by crown authority (including resorting to martial law) to bring the country under English control, heightened resentment of English rule.

From the mid-16th to the early 17th century, crown governments had carried out a policy of land confiscation and colonisation known as Plantations. Scottish and English Protestant colonists were sent to the provinces of Munster, Ulster and the counties of Laois and Offaly. These Protestant settlers replaced the Irish Catholic landowners who were removed from their lands. These settlers formed the ruling class of future British appointed administrations in Ireland. Several Penal laws, aimed at Catholics, Baptists and Presbyterians, were introduced to encourage conversion to the established (Anglican) Church of Ireland.

=== Wars and penal laws ===
After an unusually bitter Irish Catholic rebellion and civil war, Oliver Cromwell, on behalf of the English Commonwealth, re-conquered Ireland by invasion which lasted from 1649 to 1651. Under Cromwell's government, landownership in Ireland was transferred overwhelmingly to Puritan soldiery and commercial undertakers to pay for the war.

The 17th century was perhaps the bloodiest in Ireland's history. Two periods of war (1641–53 and 1689–91) caused a huge loss of life. The ultimate dispossession of most of the Irish Catholic landowning class was engineered, and recusants were subordinated under the Penal laws.

During the 17th century, Ireland was convulsed by eleven years of warfare, beginning with the Rebellion of 1641, when Irish Catholics rebelled against the domination of English and Protestant settlers. The Catholic gentry briefly ruled the country as Confederate Ireland (1642–1649) against the background of the Wars of the Three Kingdoms until Oliver Cromwell reconquered Ireland in 1649–1653 on behalf of the English Commonwealth. Cromwell's conquest was the most brutal phase of the war. By its close, around half of Ireland's pre-war population was killed or exiled into slavery, where many died due to harsh conditions. As retribution for the rebellion of 1641, the better-quality remaining lands owned by Irish Catholics were confiscated and given to British settlers. Several hundred remaining native landowners were transplanted to Connacht.

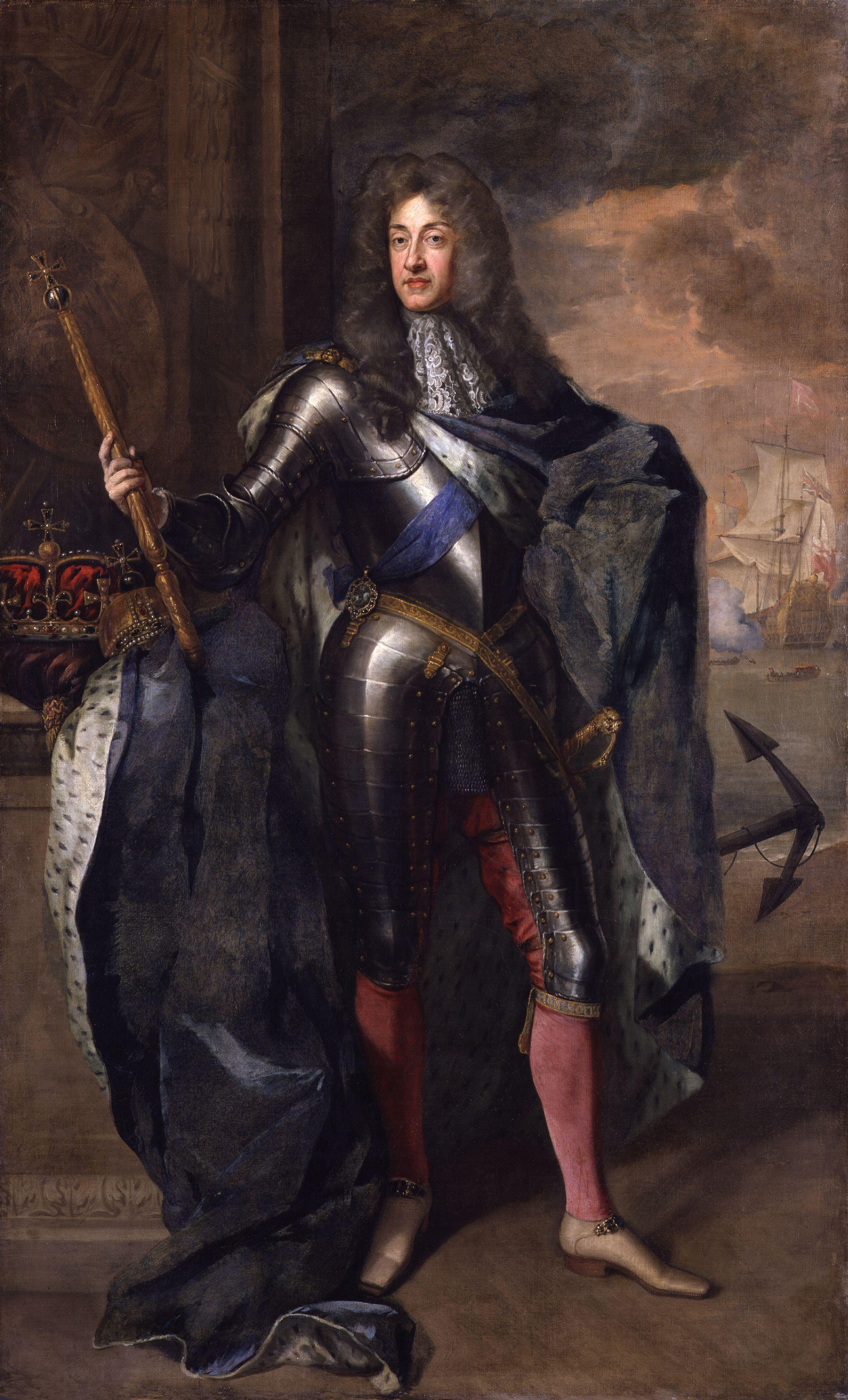
Portrait of James II by Godfrey Kneller. Forty years later, Irish Catholics, known as "Jacobites", fought for James from 1688 to 1691, but failed to restore James to the throne of Ireland, England and Scotland.

Ireland became the main battleground after the Glorious Revolution of 1688, when the Catholic James II left London and the English Parliament replaced him with William of Orange. The wealthier Irish Catholics backed James to try to reverse the Penal laws and land confiscations, whereas Protestants supported William and Mary in this "Glorious Revolution" to preserve their property in the country. James and William fought for the Kingdom of Ireland in the Williamite War, most famously at the Battle of the Boyne in 1690, where James's outnumbered forces were defeated.

==== Indentured labour ====
From the 15th to the 18th century, Irish, English, Scots and Welsh prisoners were transported for forced labour in the Caribbean to work off their term of punishment. Even larger numbers came voluntarily as indentured servants. In the 18th century they were sent to the American colonies, and in the early 19th century to Australia. The Irish were dehumanised by the English, described as "savages," so making their displacement appear all the more justified. In 1654 the British parliament gave Oliver Cromwell a free hand to banish Irish "undesirables". Cromwell rounded up Catholics throughout the Irish countryside and placed them on ships bound for the Caribbean, mainly the island of Barbados. By 1655, 12,000 political prisoners had been forcibly shipped to Barbados and into slavery.

== Protestant ascendancy (1691–1800) ==
The majority of the people of Ireland were Catholic peasants; they were very poor and largely inert politically during the eighteenth century, as many of their leaders converted to Protestantism to avoid severe economic and political penalties. Nevertheless, there was a growing Catholic cultural awakening underway. There were two Protestant groups. The Presbyterians in Ulster in the North lived in much better economic conditions but had virtually no political power. Power was held by a small group of Anglo-Irish families, who were loyal to the Anglican Church of Ireland. They owned the great bulk of the farmland, where the work was done by the Catholic peasants. Many of these families lived in England and were absentee landlords, whose loyalty was basically to England. The Anglo-Irish who lived in Ireland became increasingly identified as Irish nationalists, and were resentful of the English control of their island. Their spokesmen, such as Jonathan Swift and Edmund Burke, sought more local control.

Jacobite resistance in Ireland eventually ended after the Battle of Aughrim in July 1691. The Penal laws that had been relaxed somewhat, but after the Restoration were reinforced more thoroughly after this war, as the infant Anglo-Irish Ascendancy wanted to ensure that the Irish Roman Catholics would not be in a position to repeat their rebellions. Power was held by the 5% who were Protestants belonging to the Church of Ireland. They controlled all major sectors of the Irish economy, the bulk of the farmland, the legal system, local government and held strong majorities in both houses of the Irish Parliament. They strongly distrusted the Presbyterians in Ulster and were convinced that the Catholics should have minimal rights. They did not have full political control because the government in London had superior authority and treated Ireland as a backward colony. When the American colonies revolted in the 1770s, the Ascendency wrested multiple concessions to strengthen its power. They did not seek independence because they knew they were heavily outnumbered and ultimately depended upon the British Army to guarantee their security.

Subsequent Irish antagonism toward England was aggravated by the economic situation of Ireland in the 18th century. Some absentee landlords managed their estates inefficiently, and food tended to be produced for export rather than for domestic consumption. Two very cold winters near the end of the Little Ice Age led directly to a famine between 1740 and 1741, which killed about 400,000 people and caused over 150,000 Irish to leave the island. In addition, Irish exports were reduced by the Navigation Acts from the 1660s, which placed tariffs on Irish products entering England, but exempted English goods from tariffs on entering Ireland. Despite this, most of the 18th century was relatively peaceful in comparison with the preceding two centuries, and the population doubled to over four million.

By the 18th century, the Anglo-Irish ruling class had come to see Ireland, not England, as their native country. A Parliamentary faction led by Henry Grattan agitated for a more favorable trading relationship with Great Britain and for greater legislative independence for the Irish Parliament. However, reform in Ireland stalled over the more radical proposals toward enfranchising Irish Catholics. This was partially enabled in 1793, but Catholics could not yet become members of the Irish Parliament, or become government officials. Some were attracted to the more militant example of the French Revolution of 1789.

Presbyterians and Dissenters too faced persecution on a lesser scale, and in 1791 a group of dissident Protestant individuals, all of whom but two were Presbyterians, held the first meeting of what would become the Society of the United Irishmen. Originally they sought to reform the Irish Parliament which was controlled by those belonging to the state church; seek Catholic emancipation; and help remove religion from politics. When their ideals seemed unattainable they became more determined to use force to overthrow British rule and found a non-sectarian republic. Their activity culminated in the Irish Rebellion of 1798, which was bloodily suppressed.

Ireland was a separate kingdom ruled by George III; he set policy for Ireland through his appointment of the Lord Lieutenant of Ireland or Viceroy. In practice, the viceroys lived in England and the affairs in the island were largely controlled by an elite group of Irish Protestants known as "undertakers." The system changed in 1767, with the appointment of an English politician who became a very strong Viceroy. George Townshend served 1767–72 and was in residence in The Castle in Dublin. Townsend had the strong support of both the King and the British cabinet in London, and all major decisions were basically made in London. The Ascendancy complained, and obtained a series of new laws in the 1780s that made the Irish Parliament effective and independent of the British Parliament, although still under the supervision of the king and his Privy Council.

Largely in response to the 1798 rebellion, Irish self-government was ended altogether by the provisions of the Acts of Union 1800 (which abolished the Irish Parliament of that era).

== Union with Great Britain (1801–1912) ==
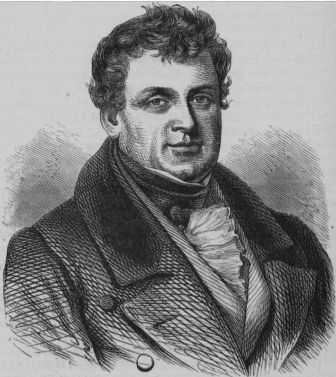
Daniel O'Connell

In 1800, following the Irish Rebellion of 1798, the Irish and the British parliaments enacted the Acts of Union. The merger created a new political entity called United Kingdom of Great Britain and Ireland with effect from 1 January 1801. Part of the agreement forming the basis of union was that the Test Act would be repealed to remove any remaining discrimination against Roman Catholics, Presbyterians, Baptists and other dissenter religions in the newly United Kingdom. However, King George III, invoking the provisions of the Act of Settlement 1701 controversially and adamantly blocked attempts by Prime Minister William Pitt the Younger. Pitt resigned in protest, but his successor Henry Addington and his new cabinet failed to legislate to repeal or change the Test Act. This was followed by the first Irish Reform Act 1832, which allowed Catholic members of parliament but raised the property qualification to £10 effectively removing the poorer Irish freeholders from the franchise.

In 1823 an enterprising Catholic lawyer, Daniel O'Connell, known in Ireland as "The Liberator" began an ultimately successful Irish campaign to achieve emancipation and to be seated in the Parliament. This culminated in O'Connell's successful election in the Clare by-election, which revived the parliamentary efforts at reform.

The Roman Catholic Relief Act 1829 was eventually approved by the UK parliament under the leadership of the Dublin-born Prime Minister, Arthur Wellesley, 1st Duke of Wellington. This indefatigable Anglo-Irish statesman, a former Chief Secretary for Ireland, and hero of the Napoleonic Wars, guided the legislation through both houses of Parliament. By threatening to resign, he persuaded George IV to sign the bill into law in 1829. The continuing obligation of Catholics to fund the established Church of Ireland, however, led to the sporadic skirmishes of the Tithe War of 1831–38. The Church was disestablished by the Gladstone government in the Irish Church Act 1869. The continuing enactment of parliamentary reform during the ensuing administrations further extended the initially limited franchise. Daniel O'Connell later led the Repeal Association in an unsuccessful campaign to undo the Act of Union 1800.

The Great Irish Famine (An Gorta Mór) was the second of Ireland's "Great Famines". It struck the country during 1845–1852, with potato blight, exacerbated by the political factors of the time leading to mass starvation and emigration. Ireland had plentiful produce at the time. However, this produce was being ceased by the British and exported to the British. Resources were sent to the irish people from other countries who were trying to stop the genocide of the Irish. These supplies, however, were destroyed by the British. Which lead to mass immigration. The impact of emigration in Ireland was severe; the population dropped from over 8 million before the Famine to 4.4 million in 1911. Gaelic or Irish, once the island's spoken language, declined in use sharply in the nineteenth century as a result of the Famine and the creation of the National School education system, as well as hostility to the language from leading Irish politicians of the time; it was largely replaced by English.

Outside mainstream nationalism, a series of violent rebellions by Irish republicans took place in 1803, under Robert Emmet; in 1848 a rebellion by the Young Irelanders, most prominent among them, Thomas Francis Meagher; and in 1867, another insurrection by the Irish Republican Brotherhood. All failed, but physical force nationalism remained an undercurrent in the nineteenth century.

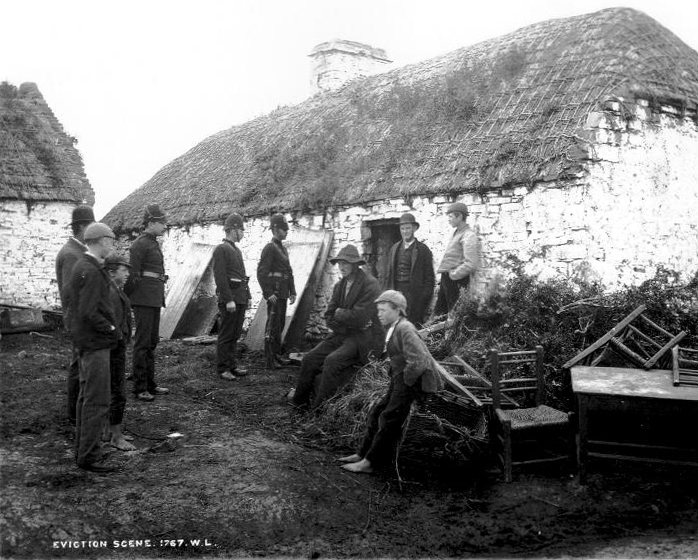
Irish family evicted at Moyasta, County Clare during Land War, c.1879

A central issue throughout the 19th and early 20th century was land ownership. A small group of about 10,000 English families owned practically all the farmland; Most were permanent residents of England, and seldom presented the land. They rented it out to Irish tenant farmers. Falling behind in rent payments meant eviction, and very bad feelings – often violence. The late 19th century witnessed major land reform, spearheaded by the Land League under Michael Davitt demanding what became known as the 3 Fs; Fair rent, free sale, fixity of tenure. Parliament passed laws in 1870, 1881, 1903 and 1909 that enabled most tenant farmers to purchase their lands, and lowered the rents of the others. From 1870 and as a result of the Land War agitations and subsequent Plan of Campaign of the 1880s, various British governments introduced a series of Irish Land Acts. William O'Brien played a leading role in the 1902 Land Conference to pave the way for the most advanced social legislation in Ireland since the Union, the Land Purchase (Ireland) Act 1903. This Act set the conditions for the break-up of large estates and gradually devolved to rural landholders, and tenants' ownership of the lands. It effectively ended the era of the absentee landlord, finally resolving the Irish Land Question.

In the 1870s the issue of Irish self-government again became a major focus of debate under Charles Stewart Parnell, founder of the Irish Parliamentary Party. Prime Minister Gladstone made two unsuccessful attempts to pass Home Rule in 1886 and 1893. Parnell's leadership ended when he was implicated in a divorce scandal that gained international publicity in 1890. He had been secretly living for years with Katherine O'Shea, the long-separated wife of a fellow Irish MP. Disaster came quickly: Gladstone and the Liberal Party refused to cooperate with him; his party split; the Irish Catholic bishops led the successful effort to crush his minority faction at by-elections. Parnell fought for control to the end, but his body was collapsing and he died in 1891 at age 45.

After the introduction of the Local Government (Ireland) Act 1898 which broke the power of the landlord-dominated "Grand Juries", passing for the first time democratic control of local affairs into the hands of the people through elected Local County Councils, the debate over full Home Rule led to tensions between Irish nationalists and Irish unionists (those who favored the maintenance of the Union). Most of the island was predominantly Nationalist, Catholic, and Agrarian. The northeast, however, was predominantly unionist, Protestant and industrialized. Unionists feared a loss of political power and economic wealth in a predominantly rural, nationalist, Catholic home-rule state. Nationalists believed they would remain economically and politically second-class citizens without self-government. Out of this division, two opposing sectarian movements evolved, the Protestant Orange Order and the Catholic Ancient Order of Hibernians.

== Home Rule, Easter Rising and War of Independence (1912–1922) ==
Home Rule became likely when in 1910 the Irish Parliamentary Party (IPP) under John Redmond held the balance of power in Commons and the third Home Rule Bill was introduced in 1912. Unionist resistance was immediate with the leadership of Edward Carson and the formation of the Ulster Volunteers. In turn the Irish Volunteers were established to oppose Unionist efforts for resistance and enforce the introduction of self-government.

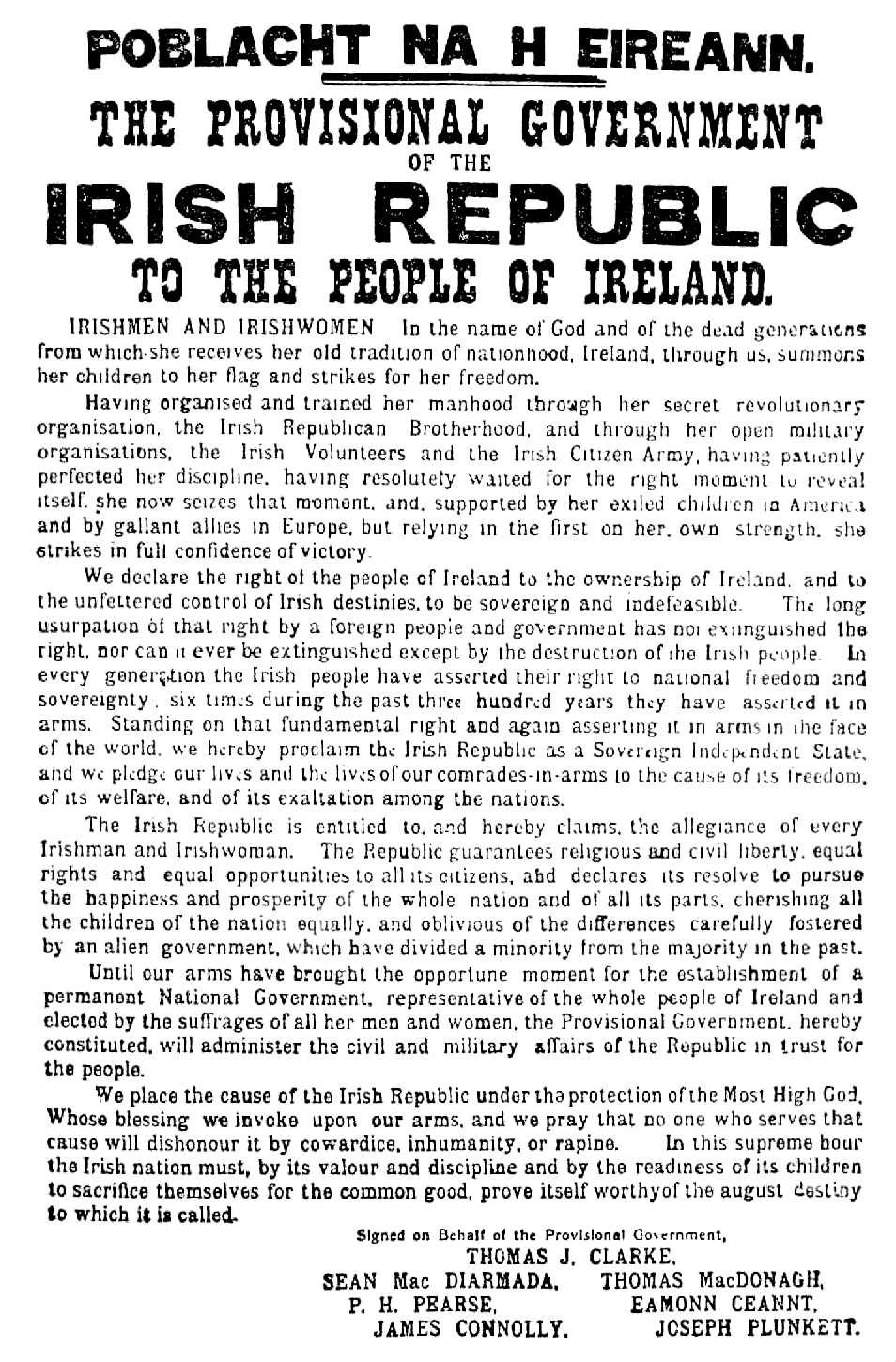
The Easter Proclamation, issued by Leaders of the Easter Rising

In September 1914, just as the First World War broke out, the UK Parliament passed the Government of Ireland Act 1914 to establish self-government for Ireland, but it was suspended for the duration of the war. To ensure implementation of Home Rule after the war, nationalist leaders and the IPP under Redmond supported Ireland's participation in the British and Allied war effort under the Triple Entente against the expansion of Central Powers. The core of the Irish Volunteers were against this decision, but the majority left to form the National Volunteers who enlisted in Irish regiments of the New British Army, the 10th and 16th (Irish) Divisions, their Northern counterparts in the 36th (Ulster) Division. Before the war ended, Britain made two concerted efforts to implement Home Rule, one in May 1916 and again with the Irish Convention during 1917–1918, but the Irish sides (Nationalist, Unionist) were unable to agree to terms for the temporary or permanent exclusion of Ulster from its provisions.

The period 1916–1921 was marked by political violence and upheaval, ending in the partition of Ireland in 1920 and independence for 26 of its 32 counties. A failed militant attempt was made to gain separate independence for Ireland with the 1916 Easter Rising, an insurrection in Dublin. Though support for the insurgents was small, the violence used in its suppression led to resentment against British rule and a swing in support of the rebels. In addition, the unprecedented threat of Irishmen being conscripted to the British Army in 1918 (for service on the Western Front as a result of the German spring offensive) accelerated this change. In the December 1918 elections Sinn Féin, the party of the rebels, won three-quarters of all seats in Ireland, twenty-seven MPs of which assembled in Dublin on 21 January 1919 to form a 32-county Irish Republic Parliament, the first Dáil Éireann unilaterally declaring sovereignty over the entire island.

Irish parliaments

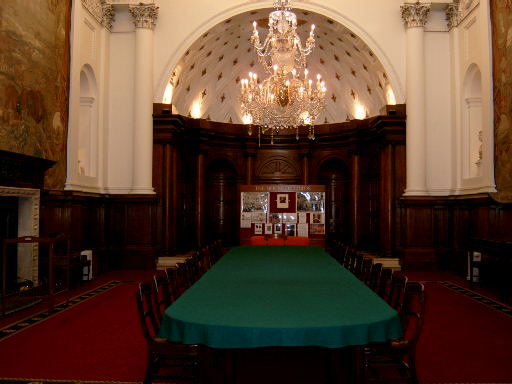
House of Lords of the Kingdom of Ireland (abolished 1800)

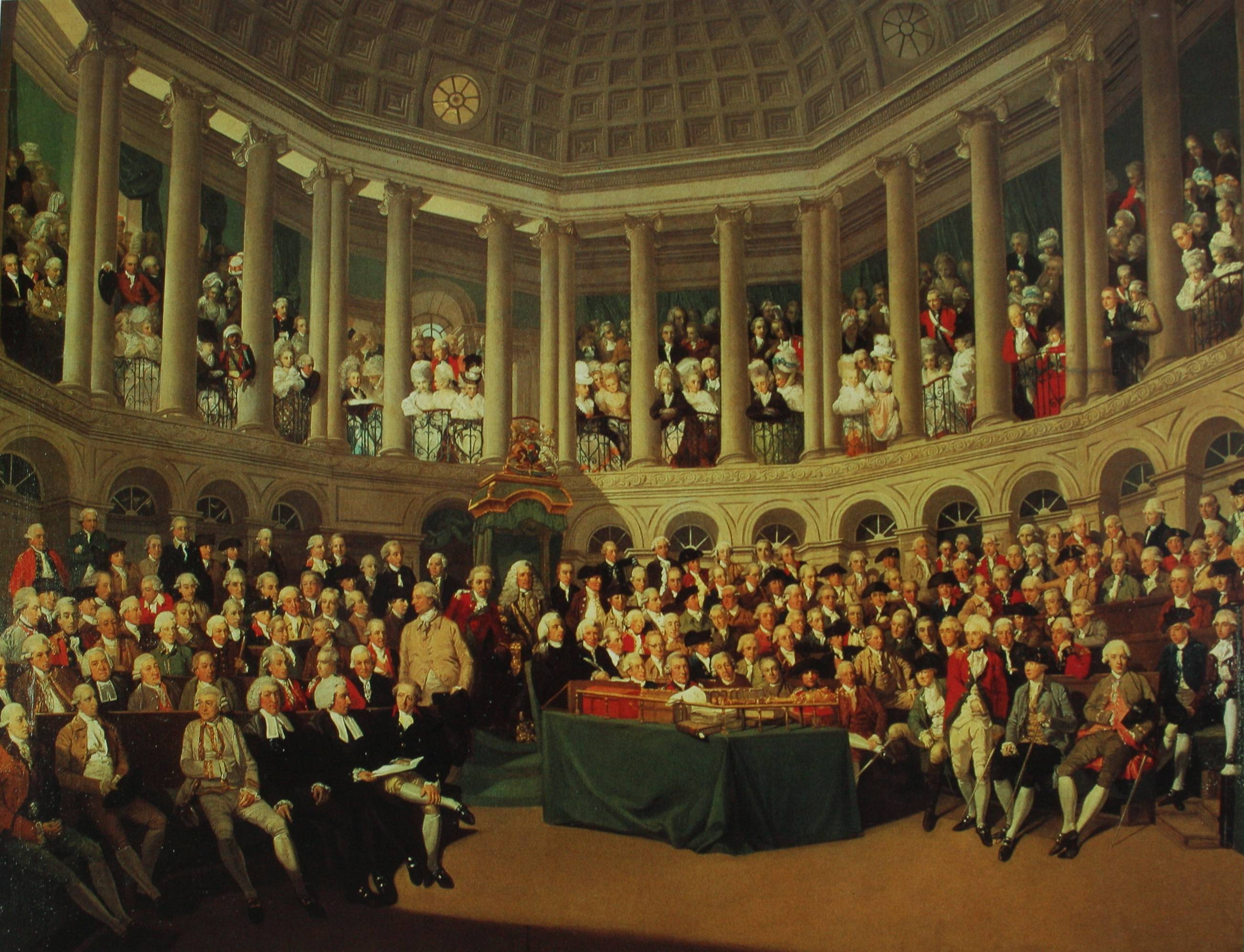
House of Commons of the Kingdom of Ireland (abolished 1800)

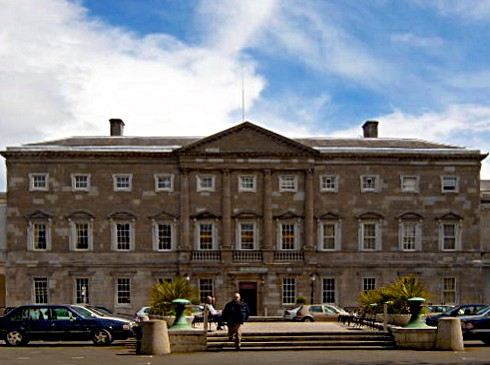
Leinster House, home of Ireland's parliament since 1922.

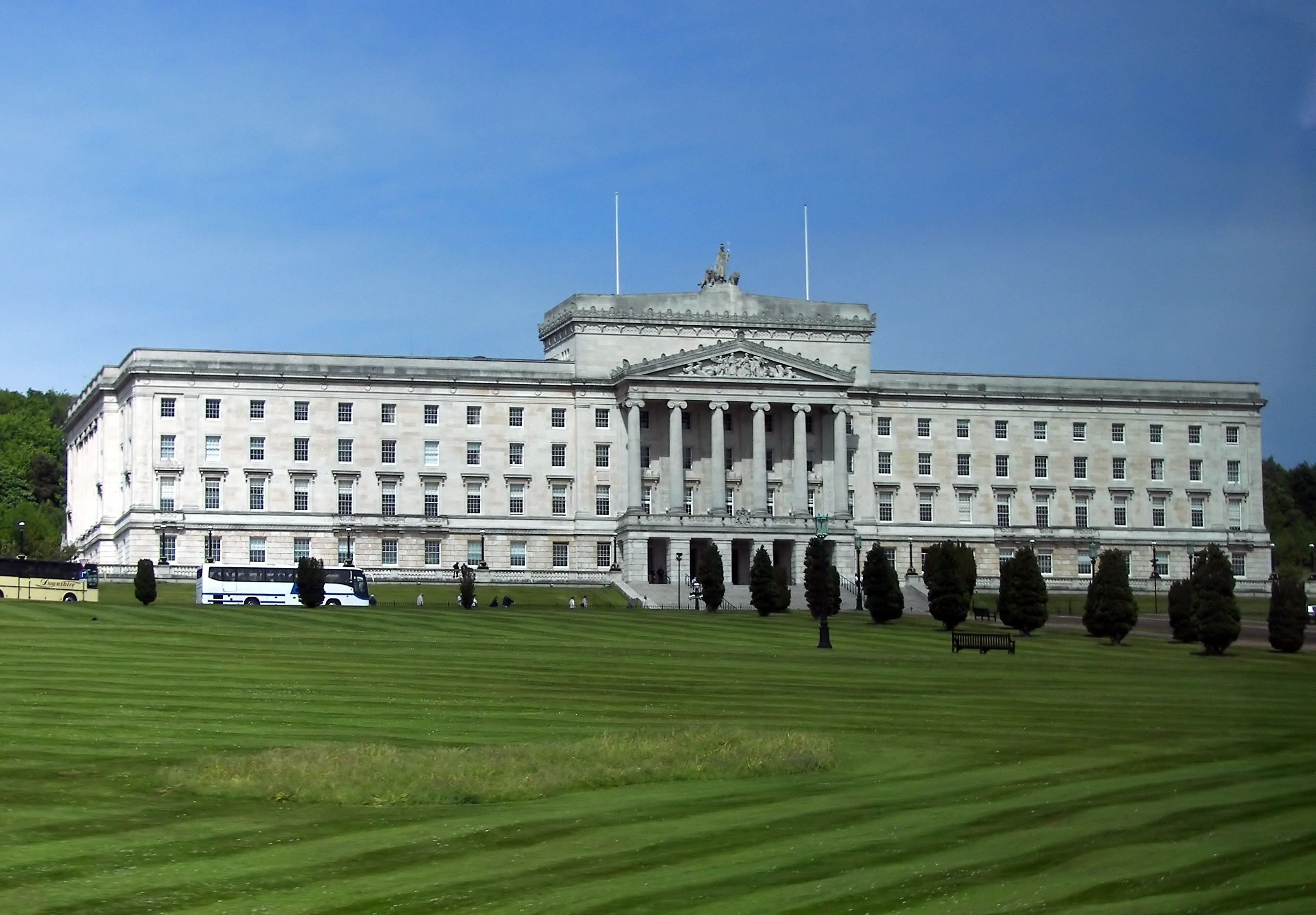
Parliament Buildings (Stormont). Previously home of Parliament. Now used by the Assembly.

Unwilling to negotiate any understanding with Britain short of complete independence, the Irish Republican Army, the army of the newly declared Irish Republic, waged a guerilla war (the Irish War of Independence) from 1919 to 1921. In the course of the fighting and amid much acrimony, the Fourth Government of Ireland Act 1920 implemented Home Rule while separating the island into what the British government's Act termed Northern Ireland and Southern Ireland. In July 1921 the Irish and British governments agreed to a truce that halted the war. In December 1921 representatives of both governments signed an Anglo-Irish Treaty. The Irish delegation was led by Arthur Griffith and Michael Collins. This abolished the Irish Republic and created the Irish Free State, a self-governing Dominion of the Commonwealth of Nations in the manner of Canada and Australia. Under the Treaty, Northern Ireland could opt out of the Free State and stay within the United Kingdom: it promptly did so. In 1922 both parliaments ratified the Treaty, formalising independence for the 26-county Irish Free State (which renamed itself Ireland in 1937, and declared itself a republic in 1949); while the 6-county Northern Ireland, gaining Home Rule for itself, remained part of the United Kingdom. For most of the next 75 years, each territory was strongly aligned to either Catholic or Protestant ideologies, although this was more marked in the six counties of Northern Ireland.

== Free State and Republic (1922–present) ==
Political map of Ireland

The treaty to sever the Union divided the republican movement into anti-Treaty (who wanted to fight on until an Irish Republic was achieved) and pro-Treaty supporters (who accepted the Free State as the first step towards full independence and unity). Between 1922 and 1923 both sides fought the bloody Irish Civil War. The new Irish Free State government defeated the anti-Treaty remnant of the Irish Republican Army, imposing multiple executions. This division among nationalists still colours Irish politics today, specifically between the two leading Irish political parties, Fianna Fáil and Fine Gael.

The new Irish Free State (1922–1937) existed against the backdrop of the growth of dictatorships in mainland Europe and a major world economic downturn in 1929. In contrast with many contemporary European states, it remained a democracy. Testament to this came when the losing faction in the Irish civil war, Éamon de Valera's Fianna Fáil, was able to take power peacefully by winning the 1932 general election. Nevertheless, until the mid-1930s, considerable parts of Irish society saw the Free State through the prism of the civil war, as a repressive, British-imposed state. It was only the peaceful change of government in 1932 that signalled the final acceptance of the Free State on their part. In contrast to many other states in the period, the Free State remained financially solvent as a result of low government expenditure, despite the Economic War with Britain. However, unemployment and emigration were high. The population declined to a low of 2.7 million recorded in the 1961 census.

The Roman Catholic Church had a powerful influence over the Irish state for much of its history. The clergy's influence meant that the Irish state had very conservative social policies, forbidding, for example, divorce, contraception, abortion, pornography as well as encouraging the censoring and banning of many books and films. In addition, the Church largely controlled the State's hospitals and schools, and remained the largest provider of many other social services.

With the partition of Ireland in 1922, 92.6% of the Free State's population were Catholic while 7.4% were Protestant. By the 1960s the Protestant population had fallen by half. Although emigration was high among all the population, due to a lack of economic opportunity, the rate of Protestant emigration was disproportionate in this period. Many Protestants left the country in the early 1920s, either because they felt unwelcome in a predominantly Catholic and nationalist state, because they were afraid due to the burning of Protestant homes (particularly of the old landed class) by republicans during the civil war, because they regarded themselves as British and did not wish to live in an independent Irish state, or because of the economic disruption caused by the recent violence. The Catholic Church had also issued a decree, known as Ne Temere, whereby the children of marriages between Catholics and Protestants had to be brought up as Catholics. From 1945, the emigration rate of Protestants fell and they became less likely to emigrate than Catholics.

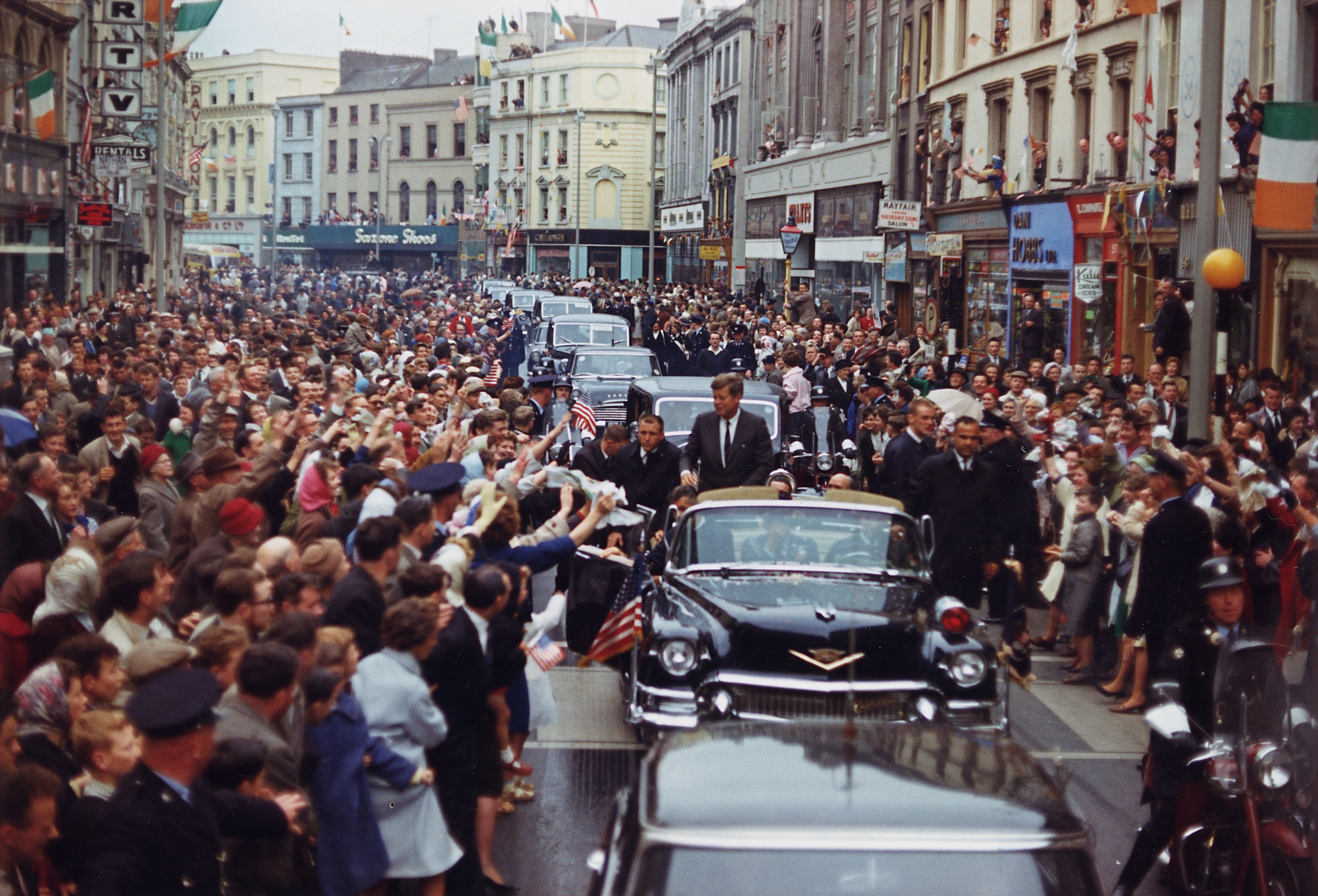
President John F. Kennedy in motorcade in Cork on 27 June 1963

In 1937 a new Constitution re-established the state as Ireland (or Éire in Irish). The state remained neutral throughout World War II (see Irish neutrality), which saved it from much of the horrors of the war, although tens of thousands volunteered to serve in the British forces. Ireland was also impacted by food rationing, and coal shortages; peat production became a priority during this time. Though nominally neutral, recent studies have suggested a far greater level of involvement by the state with the Allies than was realised, with D Day's date set on the basis of secret weather information on Atlantic storms supplied by Ireland. (For more detail on 1939–45, see main article The Emergency.)

In 1949, Ireland left the British Commonwealth and was formally declared a republic.

In the 1960s, Ireland underwent a major economic change under reforming Taoiseach (prime minister) Seán Lemass and Secretary of the Department of Finance T.K. Whitaker, who produced a series of economic plans. Free second-level education was introduced by Donogh O'Malley as Minister for Education in 1968. From the early 1960s, Ireland sought admission to the European Economic Community but, because 90% of exports were to the United Kingdom market, it did not do so until the UK did, in 1973.

Global economic problems in the 1970s, augmented by a set of misjudged economic policies followed by governments, including that of Taoiseach Jack Lynch, caused the Irish economy to stagnate. The Troubles in Northern Ireland discouraged foreign investment. Devaluation was enabled when the Irish Pound, or Punt, was established as a separate currency in 1979, breaking the link with the UK's sterling. However, economic reforms in the late 1980s, helped by investment from the European Community, led to the emergence of one of the world's highest economic growth rates, with mass immigration (particularly of people from Asia and Eastern Europe) as a feature of the late 1990s. This period came to be known as the Celtic Tiger and was focused on as a model for economic development in the former Eastern Bloc states, which entered the European Union in the early 2000s (decade). Property values had risen by a factor of between four and ten between 1993 and 2006, in part fueling the boom.

Irish society adopted relatively liberal social policies during this period. Divorce was legalized, homosexuality decriminalized, and abortion in limited cases was allowed by the Irish Supreme Court in the X Case legal judgement. Major scandals in the Roman Catholic Church, both sexual and financial, coincided with a widespread decline in religious practice, with weekly attendance at Roman Catholic Mass dropping by half in twenty years. A series of tribunals set up from the 1990s have investigated alleged malpractices by politicians, the Catholic clergy, judges, hospitals, and the Gardaí.

Ireland's newfound prosperity was challenged abruptly in 2008 when the banking system collapsed due to the Irish property bubble bursting. Some 25–26% of GDP was needed to bail out failing Irish banks and force banking sector consolidation. This was the largest banking bailout for any country in history, in comparison, only 7–8% of GDP was needed to bail out failing Finnish banks in its banking crisis in the 1990s. This resulted in a major financial and political crisis as Ireland entered a recession. Emigration rose to 1989 levels as the unemployment rate rose from 4.2% in 2007 to reach 14.6% as of February 2012.

However, since 2014, Ireland has seen strong economic growth, dubbed as the "Celtic Phoenix".

== Northern Ireland (1921–present) ==
=== "A Protestant state" (1921–1972) ===
The 1920 Government of Ireland Bill created the state of Northern Ireland, which consisted of the six northeastern counties of Londonderry, Tyrone, Fermanagh, Antrim, Down and Armagh. From 1921 to 1972, Northern Ireland was governed by a Unionist government, based at Stormont in east Belfast. Unionist leader and first Prime Minister, James Craig, declared that it would be "a Protestant State for a Protestant People". Craig's goal was to form and preserve Protestant authority in the new state which was above all an effort to secure a unionist majority. In 1926 the majority of the population in the province were Presbyterian and Anglican, therefore, solidifying Craig's Protestant political power. The Ulster Unionist Party thereafter formed every government until 1972.

Discrimination against the minority Catholic community in jobs and housing, and their total exclusion from political power due to the majoritarian electoral system, led to the emergence of the Northern Ireland Civil Rights Association in the late 1960s, inspired by Martin Luther King's civil rights movement in the United States of America. The military forces of the Northern Protestants and Northern Catholics (IRA) turned to brutal acts of violence to establish power. As time went on it became clear that these two rival states would bring about a civil war. After the Second World War, keeping the cohesion within Stormont seemed impossible; increased economic pressures, solidified Catholic unity, and British involvement ultimately led to Stormont's collapse. As the civil rights movement of the United States gained worldwide acknowledgment, Catholics rallied together to achieve a similar socio-political recognition. This resulted in the formation of various organisations such as the Northern Ireland Civil Rights Association (NICRA) in 1967 and the Campaign for Social Justice (CSJ) in 1964.

Non-violent protest became an increasingly important factor in mobilising Catholic sympathies and opinion and thus more effective in generating support than actively violent groups such as the IRA. However, these non-violent protests posed a problem to Northern Ireland's prime minister Terrance O'Neil (1963) because it hampered his efforts to persuade Catholics in Northern Ireland that they too, like their Protestant counterparts, belong within the United Kingdom. Despite O'Neil's reforming efforts there was growing discontent amongst both Catholics and Unionists. In October 1968 a peaceful civil rights march in Derry turned violent as police brutally beat protesters. The outbreak was televised by international media, and as a result the march was highly publicised which further confirmed the socio-political turmoil in Ireland. A violent counter-reaction from conservative unionists led to civil disorder, notably the Battle of the Bogside and the Northern Ireland riots of August 1969. To restore order, British troops were deployed to the streets of Northern Ireland at that time.

The violent outbreaks in the late 1960s encouraged and helped strengthen military groups such as the IRA, who served as the protectors of the working class Catholics who were vulnerable to police and civilian brutality. During the late sixties and early seventies recruitment into the IRA organisation dramatically increased as street and civilian violence worsened. The interjection from the British troops proved to be insufficient to quell the violence and thus solidified the IRA's growing military importance. On 30 January 1972 the worst tensions came to a head with the events of Bloody Sunday. Paratroops opened fire on civil rights protesters in Derry, killing 13 unarmed civilians. Bloody Friday, Bloody Sunday, and other violent acts in the early 1970s came to be known as the Troubles.

The Stormont parliament was prorogued in 1972 and abolished in 1973. Paramilitary private armies such as the Provisional Irish Republican Army, resulted from a split within the IRA, the Official IRA and Irish National Liberation Army fought against the Ulster Defence Regiment and the Ulster Volunteer Force. Moreover, the British Army and the (largely Protestant) Royal Ulster Constabulary (RUC) also took part in the chaos that resulted in the deaths of over 3,000 men, women and children, civilians and military. Most of the violence took place in Northern Ireland, but some also spread to England and across the Irish border.

=== Direct rule (1972–1999) ===
For the next 27 1/2 years, with the exception of five months in 1974, Northern Ireland was under "direct rule" with a Secretary of State for Northern Ireland in the British Cabinet responsible for the departments of the Northern Ireland government. Direct Rule was designed to be a temporary solution until Northern Ireland was capable of governing itself again. Principal acts were passed by the Parliament of the United Kingdom in the same way as for much of the rest of the UK, but many smaller measures were dealt with by Order in Council with minimal parliamentary scrutiny. Attempts were made to establish a power-sharing executive, representing both the nationalist and unionist communities, by the Northern Ireland Constitution Act of 1973 and the Sunningdale Agreement in December 1973.

Both acts however did little to create cohesion between Northern Ireland and the Republic of Ireland. The Constitution Act of 1973 formalised the UK government's affirmation of reunification of Ireland by consent only; therefore ultimately delegating the authoritative power of the border question from Stormont to the people of Northern Ireland (and the Republic of Ireland). Conversely, the Sunningdale Agreement included a "provision of a Council of Ireland which held the right to execute executive and harmonizing functions". Most significantly, the Sunningdale Agreement brought together political leaders from Northern Ireland, the Republic of Ireland and the UK to deliberate for the first time since 1925. The Northern Ireland Constitutional Convention and Jim Prior's 1982 assembly were also temporarily implemented; however all failed to either reach consensus or operate in the longer term.

During the 1970s British policy concentrated on defeating the Provisional Irish Republican Army (IRA) by military means including the policy of Ulsterisation (requiring the RUC and British Army reserve Ulster Defence Regiment to be at the forefront of combating the IRA). Although IRA violence decreased it was obvious that no military victory was on hand in either the short or medium terms. Even Catholics who generally rejected the IRA were unwilling to offer support to a state that seemed to remain mired in sectarian discrimination, and the Unionists were not interested in Catholic participation in running the state in any case. In the 1980s the IRA attempted to secure a decisive military victory based on massive arms shipments from Libya. When this failed, senior republican figures began to look to broaden the struggle from purely military means. In time this began a move towards military cessation.

In 1985 the Irish and British governments signed the Anglo-Irish Agreement signalling a formal partnership in seeking a political solution. The Anglo-Irish Agreement (AIA) recognised the Irish government's right to be consulted and heard as well as guaranteed equality of treatment and recognition of the Irish and British identities of the two communities. The agreement also stated that the two governments must implement a cross-border co-operation. Socially and economically Northern Ireland suffered the worst levels of unemployment in the UK and although high levels of public spending ensured a slow modernisation of public services and moves towards equality, progress was slow in the 1970s and 1980s. Only in the 1990s, when progress toward peace became tangible, did the economic situation brighten. By then the demographics of Northern Ireland had undergone significant change, and more than 40% of the population was Catholic.

=== Devolution and direct rule (1999–present) ===
The Good Friday Agreement of 10 April 1998 brought – on 2 December 1999 – a degree of power-sharing to Northern Ireland, giving both unionists and nationalists control of limited areas of government. However, both the power-sharing Executive and the elected Assembly were suspended between January and May 2000, and from October 2002 until April 2007, following breakdowns in trust between the political parties involving outstanding issues, including "decommissioning" of paramilitary weapons, policing reform and the removal of British Army bases. In new elections in 2003, the moderate Ulster Unionist and (nationalist) Social Democrat and Labour parties lost their dominant positions to the more hard-line Democratic Unionist and (nationalist) Sinn Féin parties. On 28 July 2005, the Provisional IRA announced the end of its armed campaign and on 25 September 2005 international weapons inspectors supervised the disarmament of the majority of weapons of the PIRA. Eventually, devolution was restored in April 2007.

On 3 February 2022, Paul Givan resigned as first minister, which automatically resigned Michelle O'Neill as deputy first minister and collapsed the executive of Northern Ireland. On 30 January 2024, leader of the DUP Jeffrey Donaldson announced that the DUP would restore an executive government on the condition that new legislation was passed by the UK house of commons.

== Modern Ireland ==
Ireland's economy became more diverse and sophisticated than ever before; integrating itself into the global economy by joining the European Economic Community (EEC), a precursor to the European Community (EC) and the European Union (EU), at the same time as the United Kingdom. By the beginning of the 1990s, Ireland had transformed itself into a modern industrial economy and generated substantial national income that benefited the entire nation. Although dependence on agriculture still remained high, Ireland's industrial economy produced sophisticated goods that rivalled international competition. Ireland's international economic boom of the 1990s became known as the Celtic tiger.

The Catholic Church, which once exercised great power, found its influence on socio-political issues in Ireland much reduced. Irish bishops were no longer able to advise and influence the public on how to exercise their political rights. Modern Ireland's detachment of the Church from ordinary life can be explained by the increasing disinterest in Church doctrine by younger generations and the questionable morality of the Church's representatives. A highly publicised case was that of Eamonn Casey, the Bishop of Galway, who resigned abruptly in 1992 after it was revealed that he had had an affair with an American woman and had fathered a child. Further controversies and scandals arose concerning paedophile and child-abusing priests. As a result, many in the Irish public began to question the credibility and effectiveness of the Catholic Church. In 2011 Ireland closed its embassy at the Vatican, an apparent result of this growing trend.

== Flags in Ireland ==
The Irish tricolour

The national flag of Ireland is a tricolour of green, white and orange. This flag, which bears the colours green for Irish Catholics, orange for Irish Protestants, and white for the desired peace between them, dates to the mid-19th century. The tricolour was first unfurled in public by Young Irelander Thomas Francis Meagher who, using the symbolism of the flag, explained his vision as follows: "The white in the centre signifies a lasting truce between the "Orange" and the "Green," and I trust that beneath its folds the hands of the Irish Protestant and the Irish Catholic may be clasped in generous and heroic brotherhood". Fellow nationalist John Mitchel said of it: "I hope to see that flag one day waving as our national banner."

After its use in the 1916 Rising it became widely accepted by nationalists as the national flag and was used officially by the Irish Republic (1919–21) and the Irish Free State (1922–37).

In 1937 when the Constitution of Ireland was introduced, the tricolour was formally confirmed as the national flag: "The national flag is the tricolour of green, white and orange." While the tricolour today is the official flag of Ireland, it is not an official flag in Northern Ireland although it is sometimes used unofficially.

The only official flag representing Northern Ireland is the Union Flag of the United Kingdom of Great Britain and Northern Ireland however its use is controversial. The Ulster Banner is sometimes used unofficially as a de facto regional flag for Northern Ireland.

Since Partition, there has been no universally accepted flag to represent the entire island. As a provisional solution for certain sports fixtures, the Flag of the Four Provinces enjoys a certain amount of general acceptance and popularity.

Historically a number of flags have been used, including:

- Saint Patrick's Flag (St Patrick's Saltire, St Patrick's Cross) which represented Ireland on the Union Flag after the Act of Union;
- a green flag with a harp (used by most nationalists in the 19th century and which is also the flag of Leinster);
- a blue flag with a harp used from the 18th century onwards by many nationalists (now the standard of the president of Ireland);
- the Irish tricolour.

St Patrick's Saltire was formerly used to represent the island of Ireland by the all-island Irish Rugby Football Union (IRFU), before the adoption of the four-provinces flag. The Gaelic Athletic Association (GAA) uses the tricolour to represent the whole island.

== Historiography ==
Ireland has a very large historiography, contributed by scholars in Ireland, North America, and Britain. There has been both a standard interpretation and, since the late 1930s, a good deal of revisionism. One of the most important themes has always been Irish nationalism—what Alfred Markey, calls:

the received nationalist tale replete with heroes, villains, and a host of stock elements, has a long history and has exercised a particularly important influence on the development of Irish identity.

Nationalism has led to numerous monographs and debates.

A great deal of attention has focused on the Irish revolutionary period, 1912–23. Starting in 2012 a series of conferences on "Reflecting on a decade of War and Revolution in Ireland 1912–1923: Historians and Public History" brought together hundreds of academics, teachers, and the general public.

=== Relations with Britain ===
Ireland in some ways was the first acquisition of the British Empire. Marshall says historians continue to debate whether Ireland should be considered part of the British Empire. Recent work by historians pays special attention to continuing Imperial aspects of Irish history, Atlantic Ocean history, and the role of migration in forming the Irish diaspora across the Empire and North America.

=== Recent approaches ===
As historiography evolves, new approaches have been applied to the Irish situation. Studies of women, and gender relationships more generally, had been rare before 1990; they now are commonplace with over 3,000 books and articles. Postcolonialism is an approach in several academic disciplines that seeks to analyze, explain, and respond to the cultural legacies of colonialism and imperialism. The emphasis is usually on the human consequences of controlling a country and establishing settlers for the economic exploitation of the native people and their land.

According to L.A. Clarkson in 1980, the 18th and 19th centuries are the best covered time frames. Recent research on 18th-century overseas trade and 19th-century agrarian conditions has broken the nationalist approach that traditionally structured Irish economic historiography. Understudied areas include economic growth and fluctuations, the labour market, capital formation, business, and history. Except for emigration, little has been written on Ireland's external economic relations in the 19th century.

== See also ==
- History of Belfast
- History of Cork
- History of Derry
- History of Dublin
- History of England
- History of Europe
- History of the European Union
- History of Galway
- History of Limerick
- History of Northern Ireland
- History of Kilkenny
- History of Ireland (1801–1923)
- History of the Republic of Ireland
- History of Scotland
- History of the United Kingdom
- History of Wales
- History of Waterford
- History of rail transport in Ireland
- History of Roman Catholicism in Ireland
- Irish Historians
- Irish genealogy
- List of historical societies in Ireland
- Timeline of Irish history
