= Vanderbank =

Vanderbank is a surname. Notable people with the surname include:

- John Vanderbank (1694–1739), English painter
- Peter Vanderbank (1649–1697), French-English engraver
