= Portrait of James II of England =

1684 painting by Godfrey Kneller

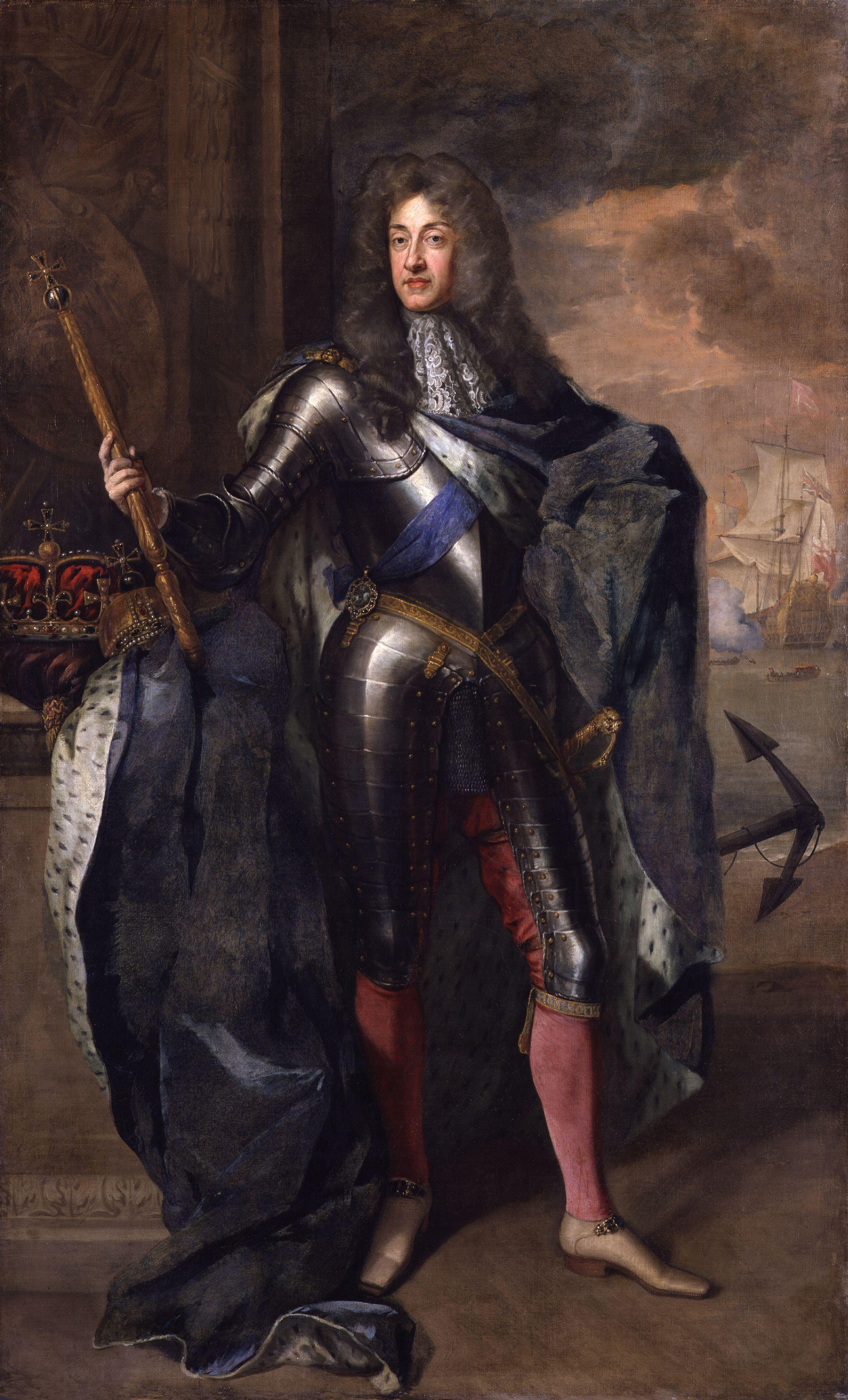
- Artist: Godfrey Kneller
- Year: 1684
- Medium: Oil on canvas, portrait painting
- Dimensions: 245.6 cm × 144.1 cm (96.7 in × 56.7 in)
- Location: National Portrait Gallery, London

Portrait of James II of England is an oil on canvas portrait painting by the German-born British artist Godfrey Kneller, from 1684. It depicts the future James II, then Duke of York and heir to his brother Charles II.

== History and description ==
He is shown dressed as Lord High Admiral, a position he had been forced to resign from during the Exclusion Crisis of 1673 but had lately been effectively restored to by his brother during the Tory Reaction of the early 1680s. The crown, orb and sceptre were added in after he became king. The following year James succeeded his brother but only reigned until 1688 when he was overthrown in the Glorious Revolution. He spent the remainder of his life in France and Ireland as his Jacobite supporters attempted to restore him to the throne.

Today it is in the National Portrait Gallery in London, having been acquired in 1882.

Isaac Beckett produced a mezzotint based on Kneller's portrait.

== See also ==
- Portrait of James, Duke of York, a 1673 painting by Henri Gascar

== Bibliography ==
- Allen, Brian. The British Portrait, 1660-1960. ISBN 1851491074. Antique Collectors' Club, 1991.
- Brennan, Laura. James II & VII: Britain's Last Catholic King. ISBN 1399012584. Pen and Sword History, 2023.
- Callow, John. The Making of King James II: The Formative Years of a Fallen King. ISBN 0750923989. Sutton, 2000.
- Piper, David. Catalogue of the Seventeenth Century Portraits in the National Portrait Gallery 1625-1714. 1963
