= Portrait of James, Duke of York =

Painting by Henri Gascar

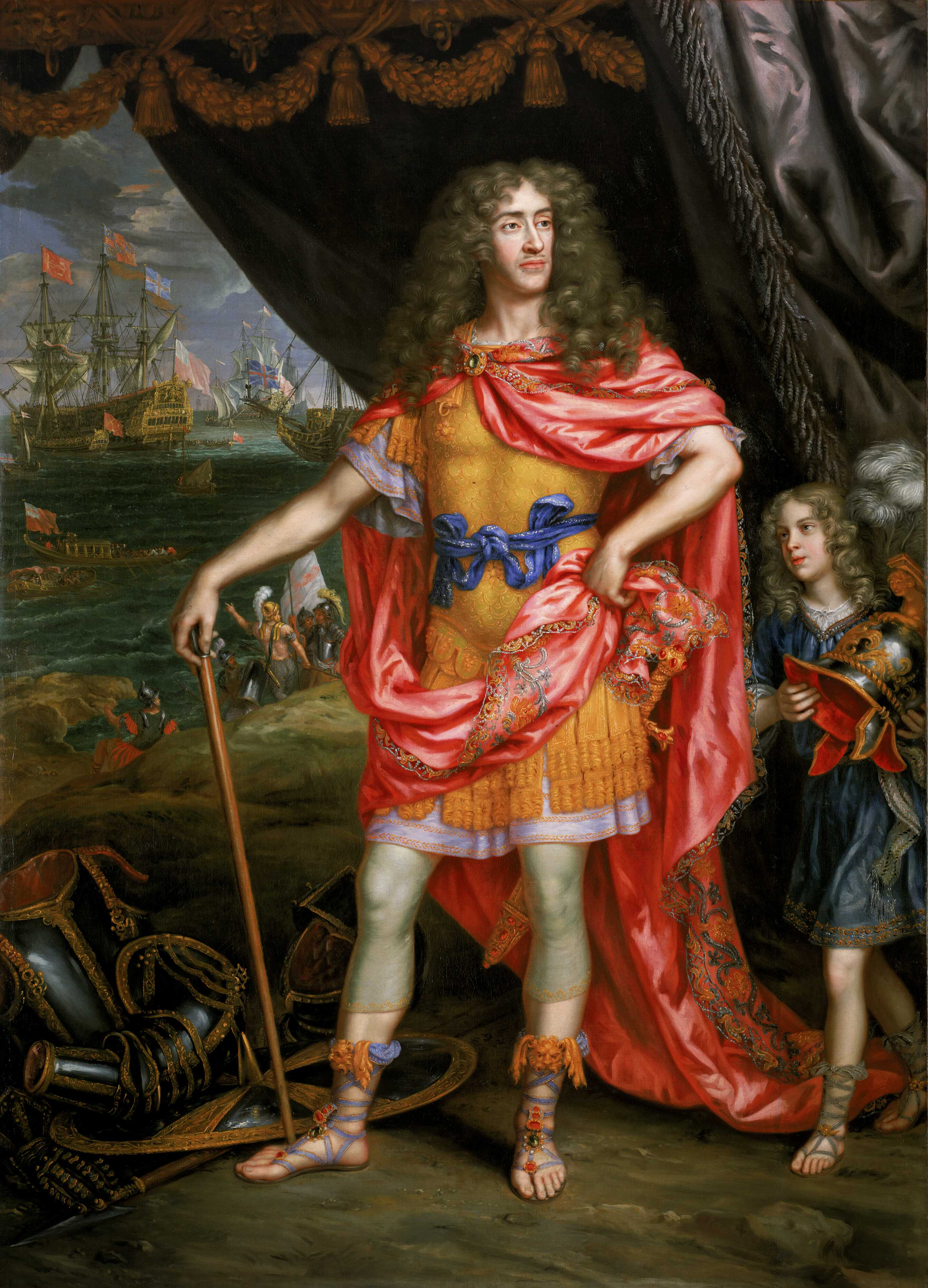
- Artist: Henri Gascar
- Year: 1672–73
- Medium: Oil on canvas, portrait painting
- Dimensions: 228.6 cm × 162.5 cm (90.0 in × 64.0 in)
- Location: National Maritime Museum, Greenwich

Portrait of James, Duke of York is a 1673 portrait painting by the French artist Henri Gascar depicting the future James II of England, then Duke of York. James is portrayed in Baroque style in Roman clothing in the style of Mars, the god of war. He stands in a pavilion with his flagship the Royal Prince in the background. The pageboy on the right was traditionally described as John Churchill, the future Duke of Marlborough, although by the time the painting was produced Churchill was an adult and serving on the continent. James was Lord High Admiral during the reign of his brother Charles II and had commanded the Royal Navy at the Battle of Lowestoft in 1665 and Battle of Solebay in 1672 during the Anglo-Dutch Wars.

Today the painting is in the collection of the National Maritime Museum in Greenwich having been presented to Greenwich Hospital by William IV in 1835.

== See also ==
- Portrait of James II of England, a 1684 portrait by Godfrey Kneller

== Bibliography ==
- Brennan, Laura. James II & VII: Britain's Last Catholic King. ISBN 1399012584. Pen and Sword History, 2023.
- Callow, John. The Making of King James II: The Formative Years of a Fallen King. ISBN 0750923989. Sutton, 2000.
- Davies, J.D. Pepys s Navy: Ships, Men and Warfare 1649-89. ISBN 1848320140. Seaforth Publishing, 2008.
- Herissone, Rebecca & Howard, Alan. Concepts of Creativity in Seventeenth-century England. ISBN 1843837404. Boydell & Brewer, 2013.
- Rosenfeld, Myra Nan. Largillierre and the Eighteenth-century Portrait. ISBN 2891920058. Montreal Museum of Fine Arts, 1982.
