= Étienne Baudet =

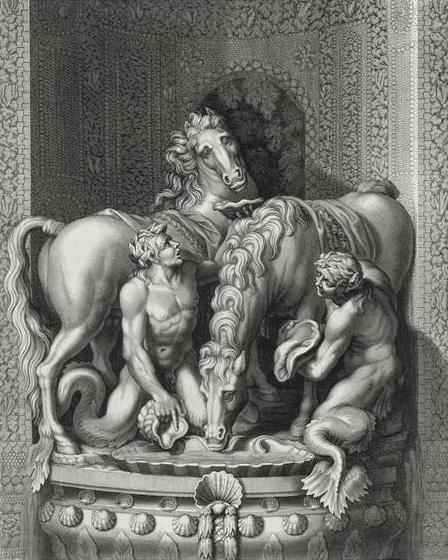
Chevaux du Soleil pansés par deux Tritons, or Sun Horses groomed by two Tritons, engraving of 1676 showing a sculpture by Gilles Guérin.

Étienne Baudet, an eminent French engraver, was born at Vineuil, in the County of Blois, about 1636. He was a pupil of Sébastien Bourdon and Cornelis Bloemaert, and afterwards went to Rome, and appears to have adopted the manner of Cornelis Bloemaert in his earliest plates, which are executed entirely with the graver. He afterwards on his return to Paris altered his manner, and calling in the assistance of the point, he executed his best prints, which bear a strong resemblance to the manner of Jean Baptiste Poilly. He made an excellent choice in the subjects of his plates, which are from the works of some of the most distinguished masters of Italy and France. He was a member of the Royal Academy of Paris, in which city he died in 1711.

== Portraits ==
The following are his principal works:

- Pope Clement IX.
- Charles Perrault; after C. Le Brun.
- Louisa, Duchess of Portsmouth, as Venus, caressing a Dove; after H. Gascar.
- Bust of the Emperor Adrian, from the antique.
- Bust of a Roman Lady.

Subjects after various masters:

- The Virgin teaching the Infant Jesus to read; after Albani.
- The Woman of Samaria; after the same.
- Four plates of the Loves of Venus and Adonis; after the same; engraved at Rome in 1672.
- Four circular prints of the Four Elements; after the same; dated 1695.
- The Nativity; after J. Blanchard.
- The Holy Family; after S. Bourdon; round.
- Six Landscapes; after the same.
- The dead Christ on the Knees of the Virgin Mary; after Annibale Carracci.
- The Stoning of Stephen; after the same. 1677.
- Adam and Eve; after Domenichino; very fine.
- Six — Of the great Staircase at Versailles; after Le Brun; that of the ceiling is engraved by C. Simmoneau.
- The Communion of the Primitive Christians; after C. de la Fosse.
- Moses treading on the Crown of Pharaoh; after N. Poussin.
- Moses striking the Rock; after the same.
- The Worshipping of the Golden Calf; after the same.
- The Holy Family; after the same.
- Venus reposing; after the same; dated 1666.
- Four Grand Landscapes; after the same; dedicated to the Prince of Condé. Dated 1684.
- Four other Grand Landscapes; after the same; dedicated to the King of France.
- The Tribute Money; after Valentin.
