= Galway Castle =

Castle in Ireland, 1124 to late 13th century

Galway Castle was a castle located in Galway, County Galway, Ireland.

== Origins ==
Built in 1124, by the King of Connacht, Tairrdelbach Ua Conchobair, known as Caislen Dún Gaillimhe ('the Castle of Fort Galway'). The contemporary Annals of Tigernach state "caistél Gaillme & Caistél Cul Maile & Castél Duin Leodha" were built by the men of Connacht, while Chronicon Scotorum states "Tri casitle la Connacht .i. caislen Duin Gaillme et Dun Leoda & Cul Maile."

The loanword caistél was "undoubtedly used to signify their resemblance to the numerous [earth and timber] motte-and-baily castles of England and France that still outnumbered stone keeps in the early twelfth century." The caistél at or within Dún Gaillimhe and those elsewhere in Connacht were sophisticated native innovations, massive stone fortifications, probably decked with timer, "a fusion of the native rath, crannog, and in particular, the cashel traditions." These were the first buildings in Éire deemed worth of being called castles, decades before the Norman invasion. And Caistél Gaillme was perhaps the very first. ... The family Tairrdelbach installed as its constables were among his admirals, so it appears the caistél or dún was one of the kingdom's naval bases. (Martyn, 2016, p. 33, 34)

== Gaelic Galway ==
The castle was destroyed in 1132 by Cormac Mac Carthaig, King of Munster and in 1149 by Toirdelbhach mac Diarmaida Ua Briain, King of Munster. It was burned, apparently accidentally, in 1161, but apparently re-built.

The full extent of Dún Gaillimhe's trade, and its classification as a 'town', is uncertain. Much later local tradition describecd it as "a small community, composed of a few families of fishermen and merchants", but this may be reading history backwards. A very few clues suggest that contacts ere broadly similar to later times. Wine was imported into pre-Norman Ireland, with war of Bristol origin, dating 1175x1250, found in Galway surin archaeological excavations. If such trade existed, then later merchants built upon pre-existing networks." (Martyn, 2016, pp. 35-36)

However, referring to Mac Carthaig's attack of 1132, Mac Carthaigh's Book states he "demolished the castle ... plundered and burned the town."

== Norman Galway ==
Richard de Burgh, Lord of Connaught captured the castle in 1232 and rebuilt it along Norman lines. It was destroyed at least twice between then and 1249 by Irish attacks. is last mentioned in 1282 when trade in the town generated enough income "to repair Galway castle." (Martyn, 2016, p. 60).

In January 2018, the de Burgh castle was re-discovered by archaeologists.
