= Henri Gascar =

French painter (c. 1635–1701)

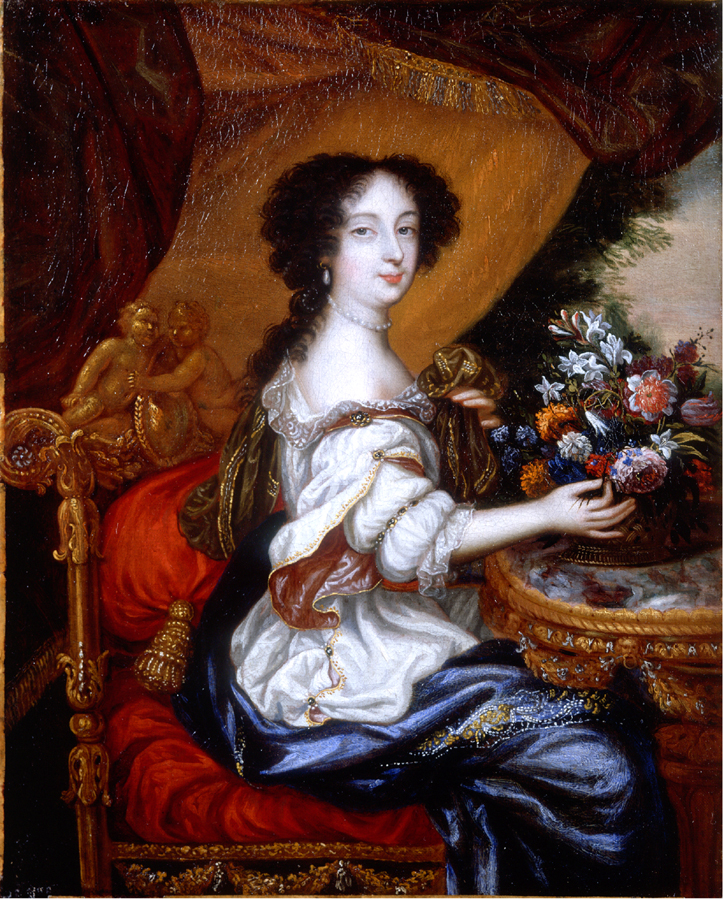
Henri Gascar, Portrait of Barbara Palmer, 1st Duchess of Cleveland

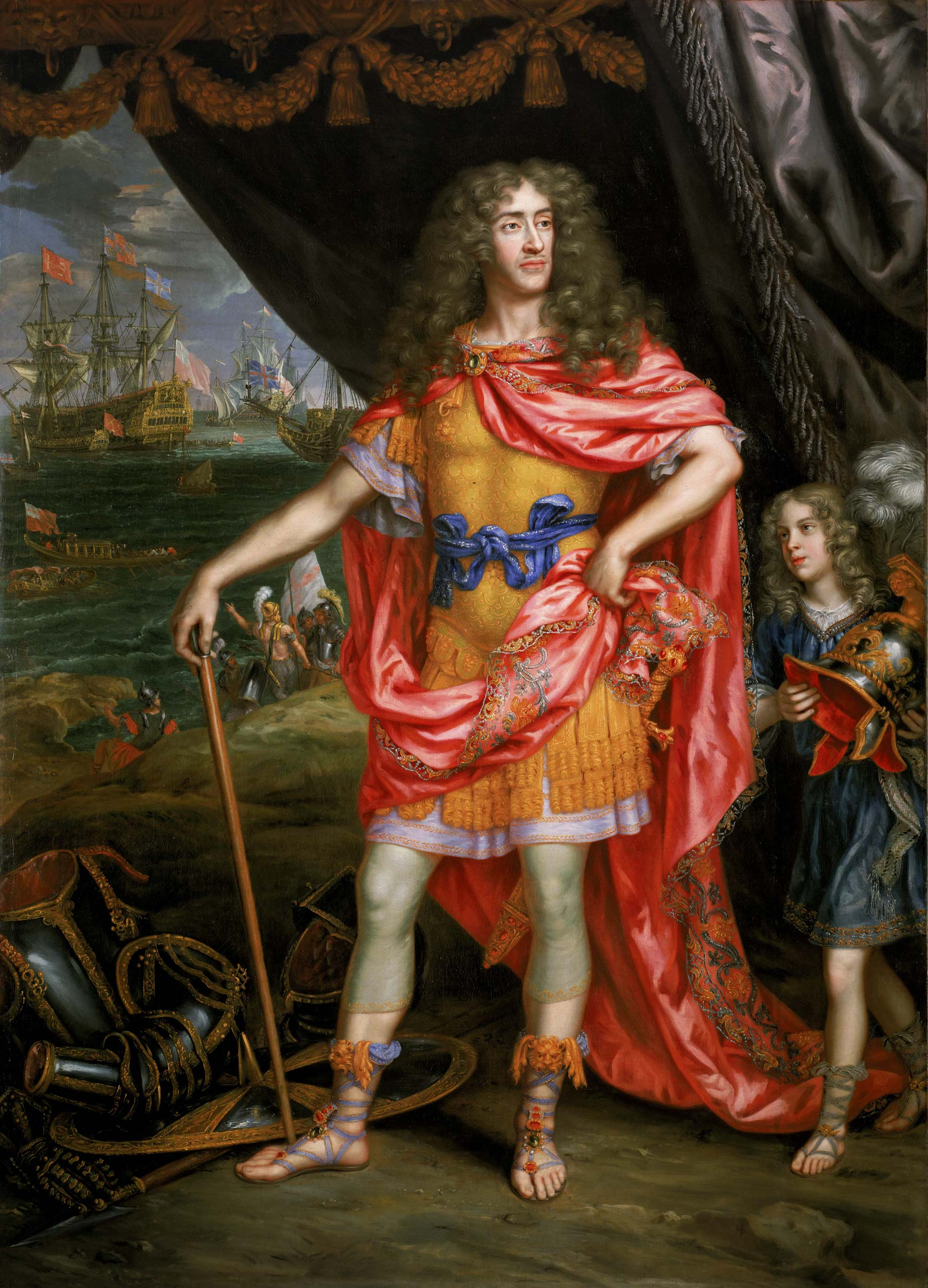
Portrait of James, Duke of York, 1673

Henri Gascar (c. 1635 – 1 Jan 1701) was a French painter who achieved artistic success in England during the reign of Charles II. He painted many leading ladies at court, including several of the King's mistresses, before returning to Paris. He subsequently relocated to Rome, where he died in 1701.

== Life and work ==
Gascar was born in Paris, the son of Pierre Gascar, a minor painter and sculptor. Gascar came to England about 1674, probably at the behest of Louise de Keroualle, Duchess of Portsmouth, Charles II's favourite mistress. Gascar (or Gascard, as he seems to have spelt his name at first) was already known as a skillful portrait-painter; among the portraits already painted by him was that of Nicolas de Lafond, author of the "Gazette of Holland", painted in 1667, and engraved by Peter Lombart.

The patronage of the Duchess of Portsmouth ensured Gascar a rapid success in England. His flamboyant style, contrasting with the stolid English approach, seemed to suit the frivolity of the time and he painted many of the ladies of Charles II's court. His lack of attention to detail in the likeness he made up for by the sumptuous draperies and tawdry adornments around the subject. For a short time he became fashionable, and is said to have amassed a fortune of over £10,000.

Among the portraits painted by him during his time in England were Charles II (engraved by Peter Vanderbank); Louise, Duchess of Portsmouth (twice - once engraved by Étienne Baudet); Barbara, Duchess of Cleveland (née Villiers), and her daughter, Barbara Fitzroy; Charles Lennox, 1st Duke of Richmond; Frances Stewart, Duchess of Richmond; George FitzRoy, 1st Duke of Northumberland; Nell Gwyn; Sophia Bulkeley (engraved by Robert Dunkarton); Edmund Verney; and Philip Herbert, 7th Earl of Pembroke. It is stated that the last-named portrait was done surreptitiously for Louise, Duchess of Portsmouth. A portrait by Gascar of James II as Duke of York was in that king's collection.

Some time before 1680 he was shrewd enough to see that his success was merely due to a fashionable craze, and he retired to Paris before this had entirely ceased. Another possibility is that he left due to increasing anti-Catholic and anti-French sentiment in England after the Popish Plot and Exclusion crisis. On his return to Paris, Gascar was elected a member of the Académie Royale there on 26 October 1680. He subsequently went to Rome, where he enjoyed a high reputation, and died there on 1 January 1701, aged 66.

About 1698 he had painted a portrait of Joseph Ferdinand, the young son of Maximilian II, which was engraved at Munich by Zimmermann. A number of mezzotint engravings done from portraits by Gascar, but bearing no engraver's name, have been attributed to Gascar himself. There is no evidence that he really engraved them, but the inscriptions do indicate the work of a non-Englishman. They are interesting as being among the earliest specimens of mezzotint engraving done in England.
