= Peter Vanderbank =

French-English engraver

Peter Vanderbank or Vandrebanc (1649–1697) was a French-English engraver.

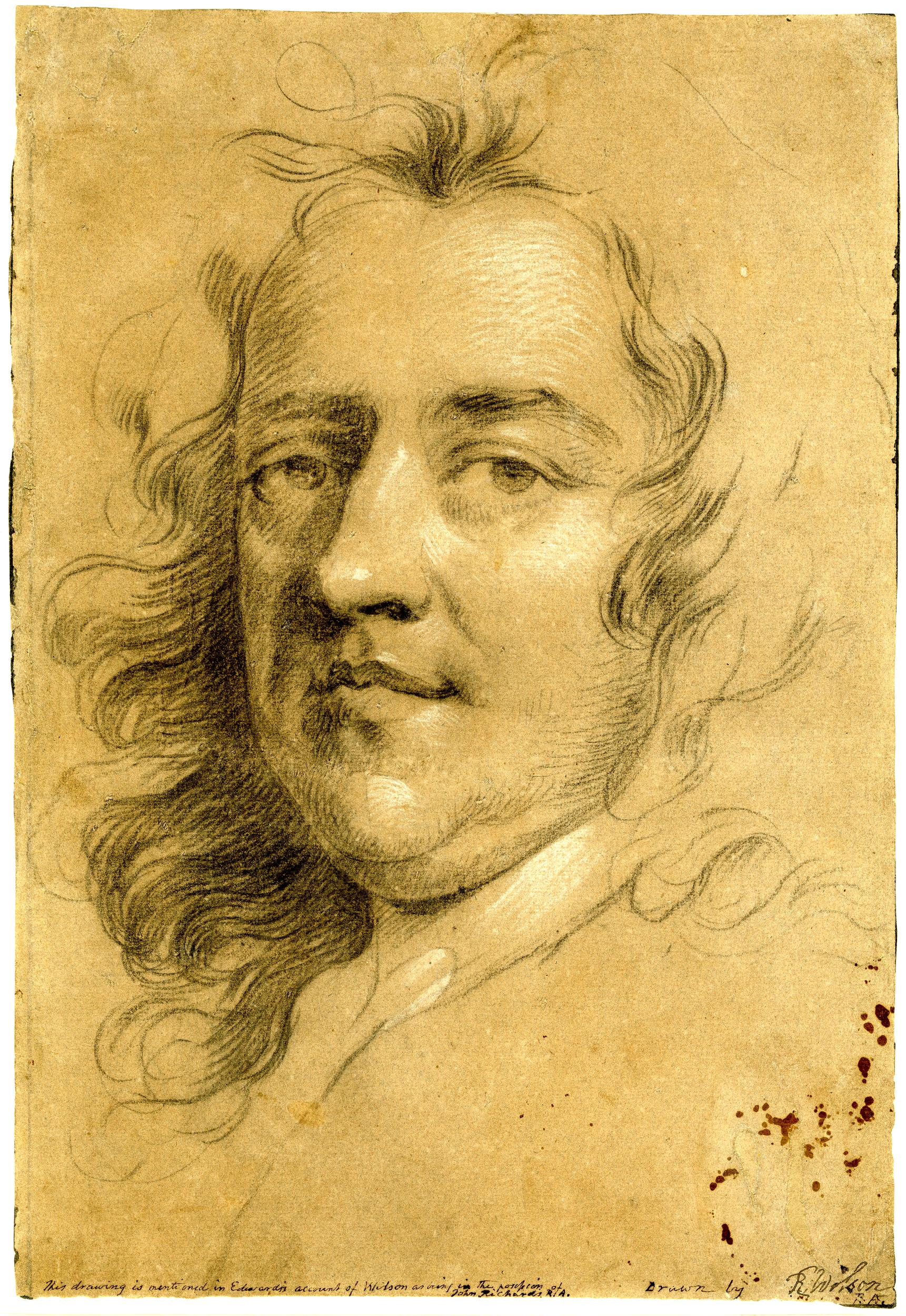
Chalk portrait of Vanderbank by Sir Godfrey Kneller

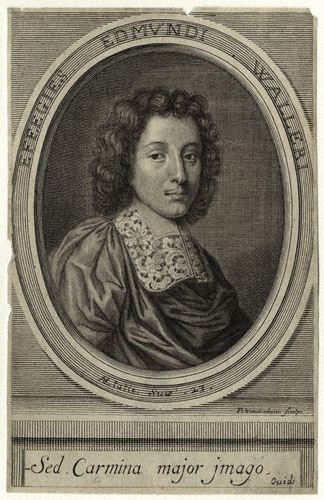
The poet Edmund Waller in engraving by Peter Vanderbank. National Portrait Gallery, London

== Life ==
Vanderbank was born in Paris in 1649, and studied his art there under Nicolas Poilly. About 1674 he accompanied Henri Gascar to England, and gained a reputation as an engraver of portraits, which he executed on a larger scale than any previously produced in this country. He appears to have had five sons, including the painter John Vanderbank. On his prints his name is always spelt Vandrebanc. He received little remuneration for his work, and at the end of life was in reduced circumstances. He died in 1697 at Bradfield, Hertfordshire, the residence of John Forester, whose sister he had married, and was buried on 4 October in the church of Cottered-cum-Bradfield.

A mezzotint by George White, inscribed ‘Peter Vanderbank, engraver,’ has been assumed to be a portrait of him, and copied by Ambrose William Warren for the 1849 edition of Horace Walpole's Anecdotes; but the costume is of a somewhat later date, and it may represent one of his sons, who is said to have practised engraving, though his works are not known.

== Works ==
They include portraits of Charles II, James II, Mary Beatrix, the Prince and Princess of Orange, Louis XIV, the Duke of Monmouth, Sir William Temple, Sir Edmund Berry Godfrey, and other prominent persons, chiefly from pictures by Peter Lely, Godfrey Kneller, and Gascar; also a ‘Holy Family’ and ‘Christ on the Mount of Olives,’ after Sébastien Bourdon, and three plates from Antonio Verrio's ceilings at Windsor Castle. Vanderbank engraved, from drawings by Edward Lutterell, the earlier portraits in White Kennett's History of England. After his death his widow sold his plates to Abraham Browne, a print-dealer.
