= 1802 in art =

List of years in Art

Events in the year 1802 in Art.

== Events ==
- May 3 – Royal Academy Exhibition of 1802 opens at Somerset House in London
- September 2 – The Salon of 1802 opens at the Louvre in Paris. Due to the Treaty of Amiens, British visitors are able to visit the exhibition for the first time in a decade
- The Journal of the Royal Institution records one of the first experiments in photography.
- Antonio Canova models the bust of Napoleon later used for his statue Napoleon as Mars the Peacemaker.
- Marie Tussaud first exhibits her wax sculptures in London, having been commissioned during the Reign of Terror in France to make death masks of the victims.

== Works ==
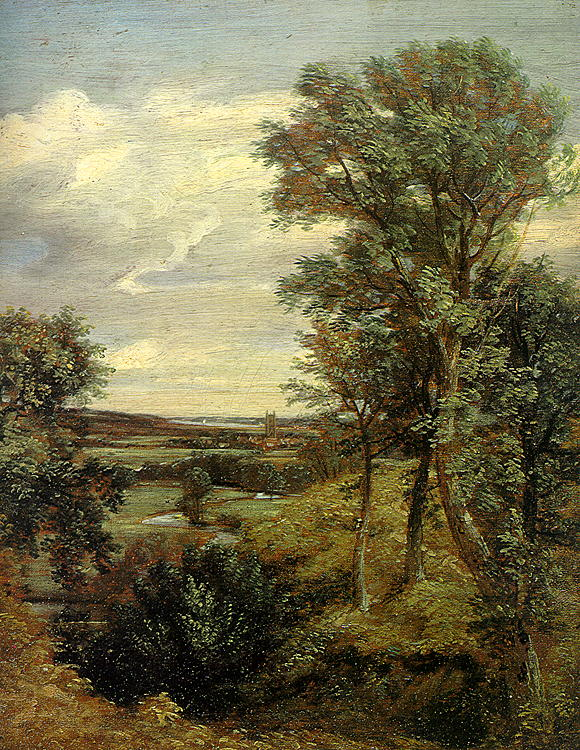
John Constable, Dedham Vale, 1802

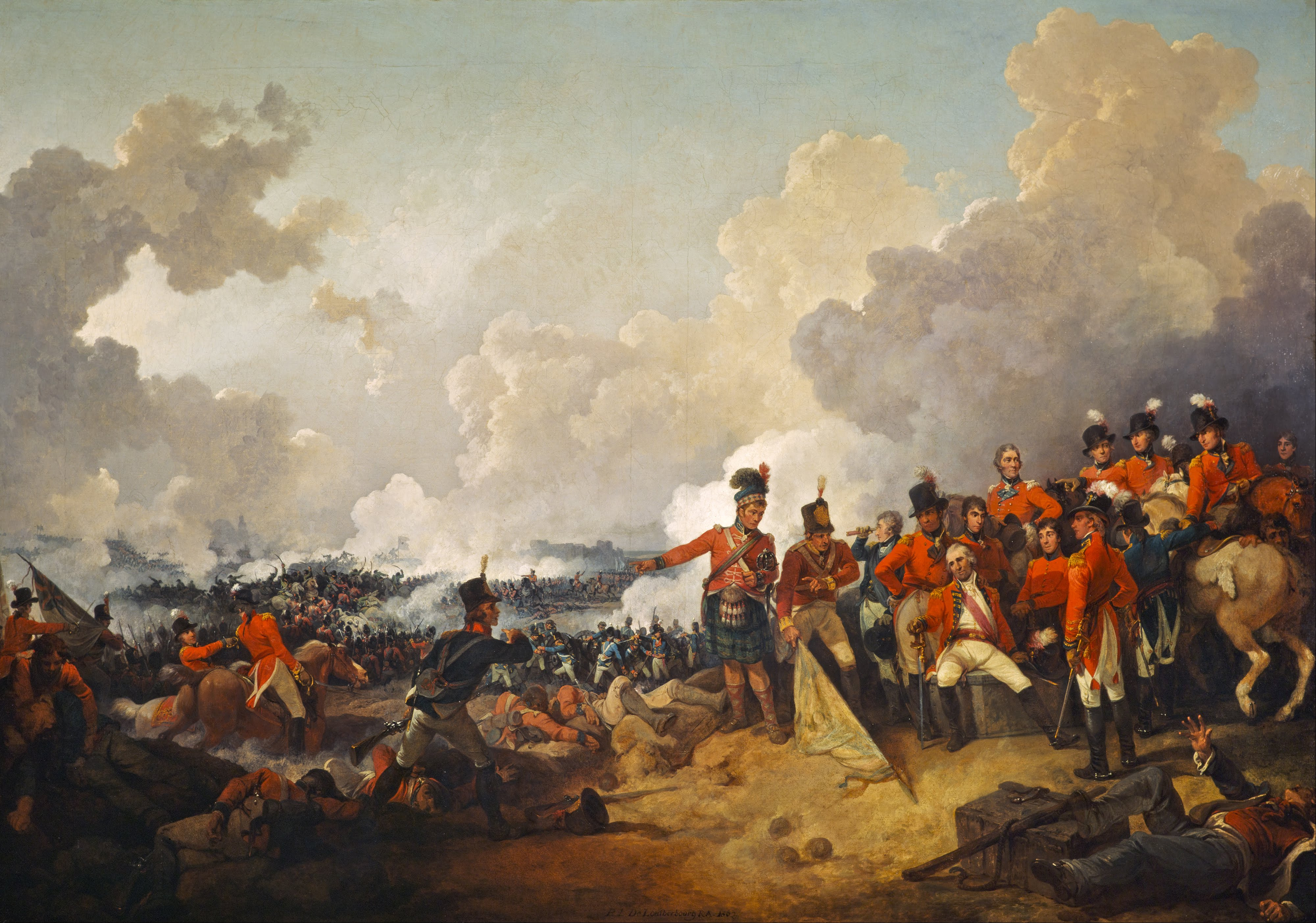
Philip James de Loutherbourg, The Battle of Alexandria.

- John Constable – Dedham Vale
- Philip James de Loutherbourg
  - The Battle of Alexandria
  - The Capture of the Chevrette
  - The Landing of British Troops at Aboukir
- François Fleury-Richard – Valentine of Milan Mourning Her Husband the Duke of Orléans
- François Gérard – Madame Récamier
- Anne-Louis Girodet de Roussy-Trioson – Apotheosis of French Heroes Who Died for the Fatherland during the War of Liberation
- Thomas Lawrence – Portrait of Countess Conyngham
- John Opie – The Angry Father
- Christian Gottlieb Schick – Portrait of Wilhelmine Cotta (Staatsgalerie Stuttgart)
- Manuel Tolsá – Equestrian statue of Charles IV (Mexico City)
- J.M.W. Turner
  - Ben Lomond Mountains, Scotland
  - Fishermen Upon a Lee-Shore in Squally Weather
  - Jason
  - Salisbury Cathedral from the Cloisters
  - Ships Bearing Up for Anchorage
- John Trumbull – Self-Portrait (Yale University Art Gallery)
- Utamaro – Ten Forms of Feminine Physiognomy (print series)
- Rafail's Cross (woodcarving, Rila Monastery, Bulgaria)

== Births ==
- March 7 – Edwin Landseer, English painter and sculptor (died 1873)
- May 20 – David Octavius Hill, Scottish painter and pioneer photographer (died 1870)
- June 17 – Hermann Goldschmidt, German painter and astronomer (died 1866)
- August 26 – Ludwig Michael Schwanthaler, German sculptor (died 1848)
- December 25 – Richard Parkes Bonington, English landscape painter (died 1828)
- Undated
  - Emma Fürstenhoff, Swedish florist (died 1871)
  - Henry Room, English portrait painter (died 1850)

== Deaths ==
- April 27 – Josef Kramolín, Czech fresco painter (born 1730)
- June 20 – Gaetano Gandolfi, Bolognese painter (born 1734)
- September 12 – Philip Jean, Jersey-born miniaturist painter (born 1755)
- September 30 – Mikhail Kozlovsky, Russian Neoclassical sculptor (born 1753)
- October 16 – Joseph Strutt, English engraver and antiquary (born 1749)
- October 24 – John Ramage, Irish American goldsmith and miniaturist (born 1748)
- November 9 – Thomas Girtin, English painter and etcher (born 1775)
- November 15 – George Romney, English painter (born 1734)
- December 5 – Lemuel Francis Abbott, English portrait painter (born 1760)
- December 17 – Johannes Wiedewelt, Danish sculptor (born 1731)
- December 27 – Jens Juel, Danish portrait painter (born 1745)
- date unknown
  - Ivan Argunov, Russian painter (born 1727)
  - James Basire, English engraver who apprenticed William Blake (born 1730)
  - Giuseppe Canale, Italian painter and engraver (born 1725)
  - Étienne de La Vallée Poussin, French history painter and creator of interior decorative schemes (born 1735)
