= 1730 in art =

Events from the year 1730 in art.

== Events ==
- Pope Clement XII commissions Nicola Salvi to renovate the Trevi Fountain

== Works ==
- Canaletto
  - The Bacino di San Marco (National Museum Cardiff)
  - The Grand Canal and the Church of the Salute
  - The Molo Looking East
  - Venice: the Grand Canal with S. Maria della Salute towards the Riva degli Schiavoni (British Royal Collection, Windsor Castle)
- Rosalba Carriera – Flora
- William Hogarth
  - A Children's Party
  - A House of Cards
- Henry Scheemakers – Memorial to Sir Francis Page and Frances, Lady Page (Steeple Aston church, Oxfordshire)
- Enoch Seeman – Portrait of King George I
- Hamlet Winstanley – Portrait of Bishop Edward Waddington

== Births ==
- January 15 – Mauro Antonio Tesi, Italian painter, active mainly in Bologna (died 1766)
- January 22 – Johan Edvard Mandelberg, Swedish-born painter (died 1786)
- April 1 – Solomon Gessner, Swiss painter and poet (died 1788)
- April 11 – Josef Kramolín, Czech fresco painter (died 1802)
- July 12 – Josiah Wedgwood, English potter (died 1795)
- July 31 – Charles-Antoine Bridan, French sculptor (died 1805)
- September 19 – Augustin Pajou, French sculptor (died 1809)
- November 2 – Giovanni Battista Casanova, Italian painter and printmaker (died 1795)
- November 3 – Pierre-Simon-Benjamin Duvivier, French engraver of coins and medals (died 1819)
- date unknown
  - Jacques-François Amand, French historical painter (died 1769)
  - James Basire, English engraver who apprenticed William Blake (died 1802)
  - Antonio Capellini, Italian engraver (died unknown)
  - Niccolò Carissa, Italian painter of still-life specimens of flowers, vegetables, and birds (died unknown)
  - Teodor Kračun, Serbian painter, active mainly in North Serbia (died 1781)
  - Niccolò Lapiccola, Italian painter (died 1790)
  - Dionigi Valesi, Italian printmaker active in Verona and Venice (died 1780)
  - Min Zhen, Chinese painter and seal carver born in Nanchang in Jiangxi (died 1788)
- probable
  - (b. 1730/1738): Aleijadinho, colonial Brazil-born sculptor and architect (died 1814)
  - (b. 1730/1732): Carl-Ludwig Christinek, Russian painter (died 1794)
  - Alexander Bannermann, English engraver (died unknown)
  - George Barret, Sr., Irish landscape artist (died 1784)
  - Gabriele Bella, Italian Baroque painter (died 1799)
  - Robert Carver, Irish painter especially of theater scenery (died 1791)
  - Dorning Rasbotham, English writer and painter (died 1791)

== Deaths ==
- February 12 – Luca Carlevarijs or Carlevaris, Italian painter of landscapes (vedutista) (born 1663)
- February 26 – Johann Peter Alexander Wagner, Rococo sculptor (died 1809)
- March 30 – Jaime Mosen Ponz, Spanish painter (born 1671)
- July 18 – Tommaso Dossi, Italian painter from Verona (born 1678)
- October 25 – Johann Michael Rottmayr, Austrian painter (born 1656)
- October 29 – Jean Louis Petitot, French enamel painter (born 1652)
- October 30 – Antonio Cifrondi, Italian painter of genre works (born 1655)
- November 10 – Gregorio Lazzarini, Italian painter of religious subjects and those from history and mythology (born 1657)
- November 21 – François de Troy, French painter, father of Jean-François de Troy (born 1645)
- December – Alida Withoos, Dutch botanical artist and painter (born 1661/1662)
- date unknown
  - Giovanni Paolo Castelli, Italian still-life painter, active in Rome (born 1659)
  - Huang Ding, Chinese landscape painter and poet during the Qing Dynasty (born 1650)
  - Giovanni Girolamo Frezza, Italian engraver (born 1659)
  - Giovanni Battista Parodi, Italian fresco painter (born 1674)
  - Sieuwert van der Meulen, Dutch painter (born 1663)
  - Marc van Duvenede, Flemish painter (born 1674)
  - François-Alexandre Verdier, French painter, draftsman and engraver (born 1651)
- probable
  - Pietro Nelli, Italian portrait painter (born 1672)
  - Clemente de Torres, Spanish Baroque painter of Genoese origin (born 1662)
