= 1674 in art =

List of years in art	(table)
- … 1664; 1665; 1666; 1667; 1668; 1669; 1670; 1671; 1672; 1673; 1674; 1675; 1676; 1677; 1678; 1679; 1680; 1681; 1682; 1683; 1684 …
- Art; Archaeology; Architecture; Literature; Music; Philosophy; Science; +...

Events from the year 1674 in art.

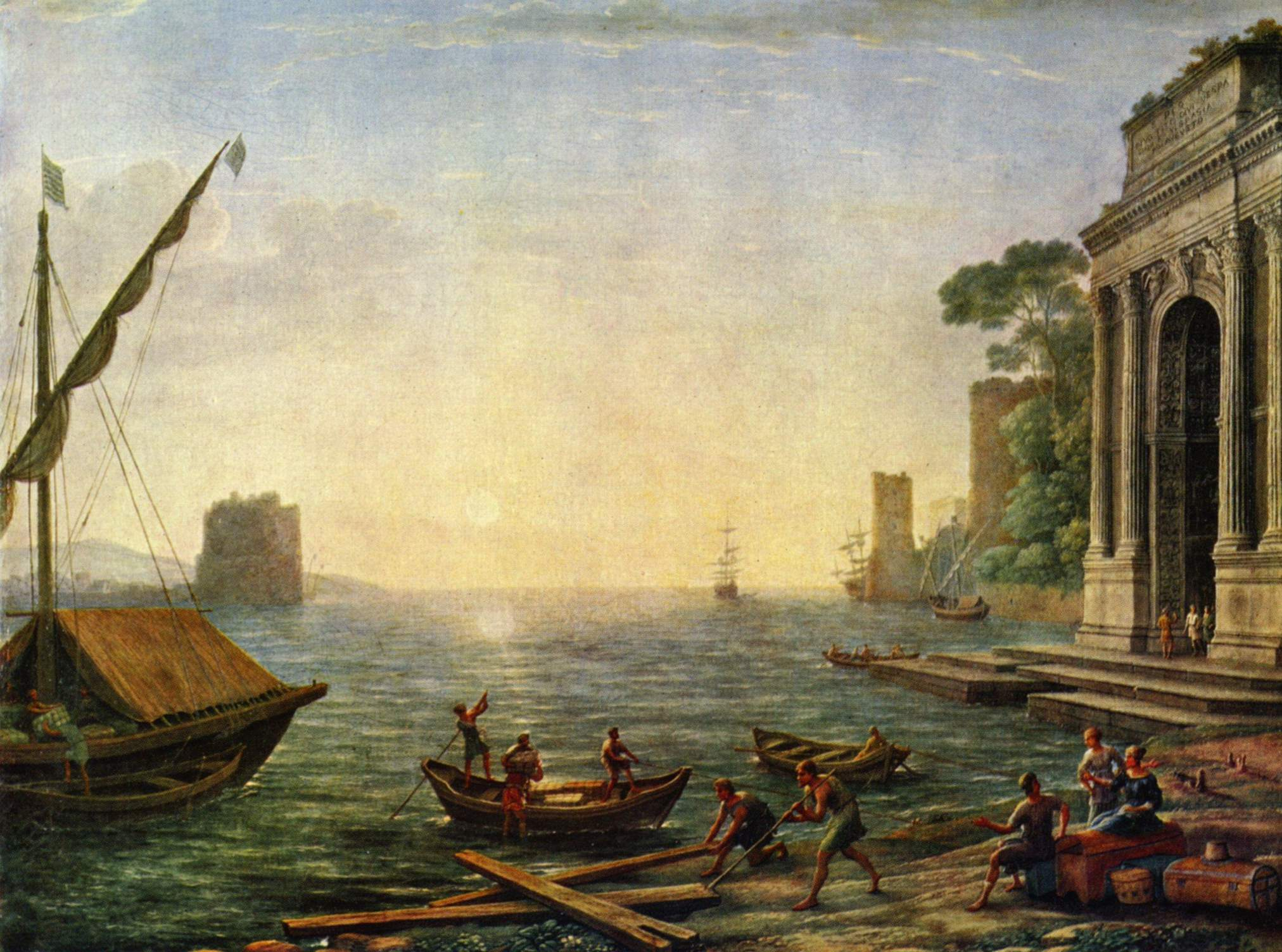
Seaport by Claude Lorrain

== Events ==
- The Académie royale de peinture et de sculpture holds the first Salon in Paris.

== Paintings ==
- Mary Beale – Portrait of Jan Baptist van Helmont (approximate date)
- Claude Lorrain – Seaport
- Gerard de Lairesse – Expulsion of Heliodorus from the Temple
- Antonio Verrio – The Sea Triumph of Charles II

== Births ==
- January 12 – Alexis Simon Belle, French portrait painter (died 1734)
- January 28 - Jean Ranc, French portrait painter (died 1735)
- June 28 – Pier Leone Ghezzi, Italian Rococo painter and caricaturist active in Rome (died 1755)
- date unknown
  - Diego Francesco Carlone, Italian sculptor (died 1750)
  - Giovanni Costanzi, Italian gem engraver of the late-Baroque period (died 1754)
  - Giuseppe Palmieri, Italian painter (died 1740)
  - Giovanni Battista Parodi, Italian fresco painter (died 1730)
  - Marc van Duvenede, Flemish painter (died 1730)
  - Giampietro Zanotti, Italian painter and art historian of the late-Baroque or Rococo period (died 1765)
- probable – Onofrio Avellino, Italian painter (died 1741)

== Deaths ==
- February – Leonaert Bramer, Dutch painter (born 1596)
- May - Balthazard Marsy, French sculptor (born 1628)
- June 4 – Jan Lievens, Dutch painter and visual artist (born 1607)
- July 30 – Karel Škréta, Czech Baroque painter (born 1610)
- August 12 – Philippe de Champaigne, French Baroque portrait painter (born 1602)
- September 29 – Gerbrand van den Eeckhout, Dutch Golden Age painter (born 1621)
- November 4 - Kanō Tanyū, Japanese painter (born 1602)
- date unknown
  - Charles Audran, French engraver (born 1594)
  - Pieter Boel, Flemish painter (born 1626)
  - Pedro de Camprobín, Spanish painter of animals, fruit, and flowers (born 1605)
  - Pieter de Jode II, engraver (born 1601)
  - Chöying Dorje, 10th Karmapa, head of the Kagyu School of Tibetan Buddhism and a painter and sculptor (born 1604)
  - Hu Zhengyan, Chinese artist, printmaker, calligrapher and publisher (born c. 1584)
  - Nicolas Jarry, French calligrapher (born 1620)
  - Vincenzo Manenti, Italian painter who worked on the cathedral at Tivoli (born 1600)
  - Tomás Yepes, Spanish painter of primarily bodegóns (born 1595)
- probable
  - Kun Can, Chinese painter from Hunan who spent most of his life in Nanjing (born 1612)
  - Bartolommeo Torregiani, Italian painter of landscapes and portraits (date of birth unknown)
  - Pieter Xavery, Flemish sculptor (born 1647)
