= Torregiani =

Torregiani is an Italian surname. Notable people with the surname include:

- Bartolommeo Torregiani (died c. 1674), Italian painter
- Luigi Maria Torreggiani (1697–1777), Italian Roman Catholic cardinal
- Vincenzo Torregiani (1742–1770), Italian painter
