= Royal Academy Exhibition of 1802 =

1802 art exhibition in London

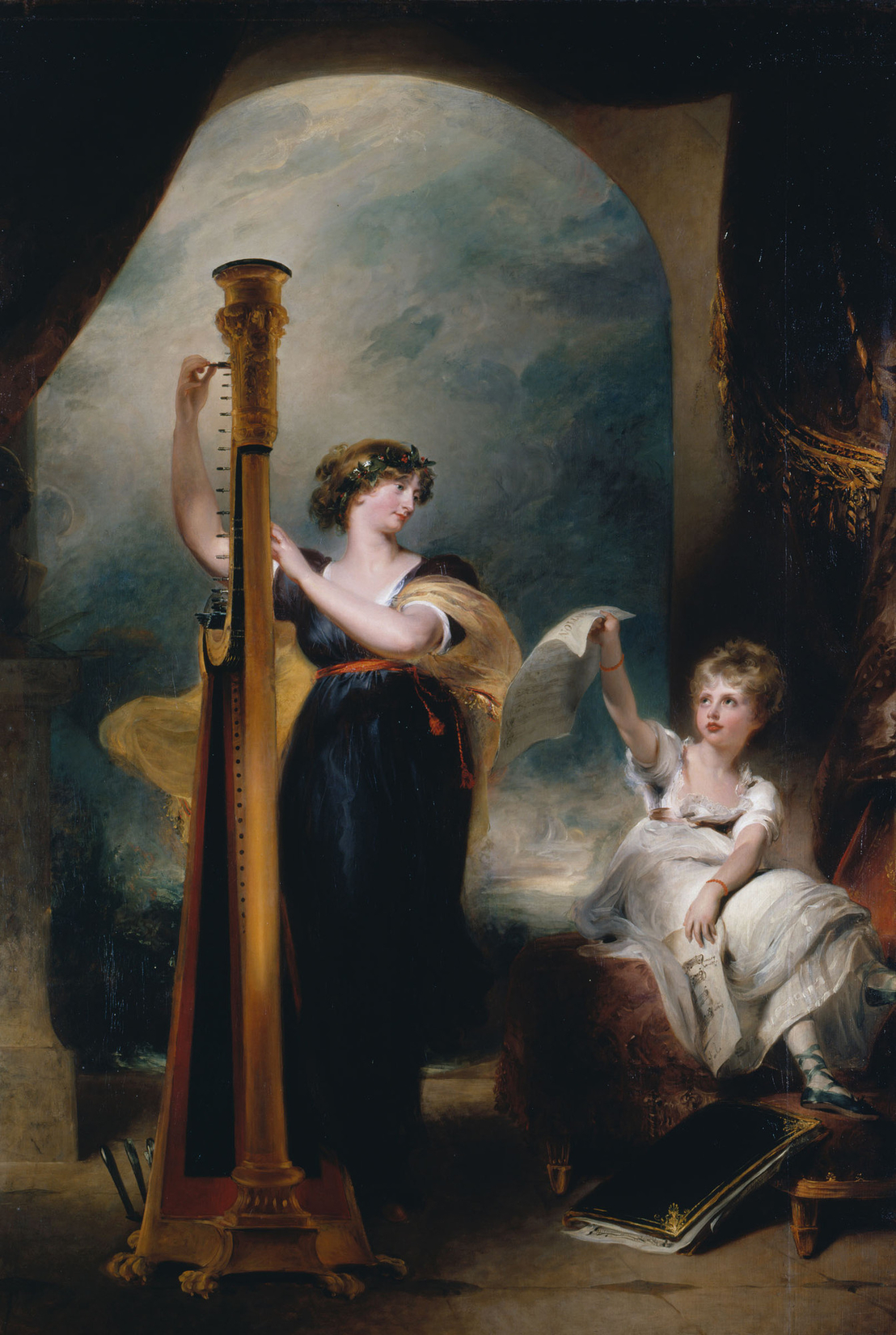
Caroline, Princess of Wales and Princess Charlotte by Thomas Lawrence

The Royal Academy Exhibition of 1802 was the thirty fourth annual Royal Academy Summer Exhibition. It was held at Somerset House in London between 3 May and 12 June 1802 and featured submissions from over five hundred artists and architects. As was common during the period, there was a strong preponderance of portrait paintings over other genres. Critics drew particular attention to the works of three artists Thomas Lawrence, Martin Archer Shee and William Beechey. Beechey attracted interest for his Royal portraits of Cumberland and Princess Augusta, as well as one of the inventor James Watt.

Aside from his portraits of aristocratic figures Lawrence also painted a notable royal picture. Caroline, Princess of Wales and Princess Charlotte a dual portrait featuring the king's daughter-in-law Caroline of Brunswick and granddaughter Charlotte. Caroline was estranged from her husband the Prince of Wales and living in Blackheath where the painter visited her for sittings. The work was well received at the exhibition, but the circumstances around the paintings production later led to Lawrence being dragged into the Delicate Investigation and accused of adultery with Caroline. Archer Shee displayed portraits of the politician Earl Spencer and his wife.

The Pennsylvania-born President of the Royal Academy Benjamin West submitted a genre scene Paddington Canal alongside several historical paintings. His fellow American Washington Allston submitted three works. Philip James de Loutherbourg featured a romantic battle painting The Capture of the Chevrette depicting a naval action from the French Revolutionary Wars. Mary Moser, one of the two female founding members of the Academy, submitted her final work the history painting Queen Eleanor’s Confession to King Henry the Second.

The young J.M.W. Turner, recently elected as a full member of the academy, sent in a batch of works there that included several seascapes. Turner also exhibited watercolours from his journeys around Britain. Turner's future rival John Constable made his debut with a landscape The Edge of a Wood. Although it has not been identified amongst his works, it likely featured his native Suffolk.

== Gallery ==
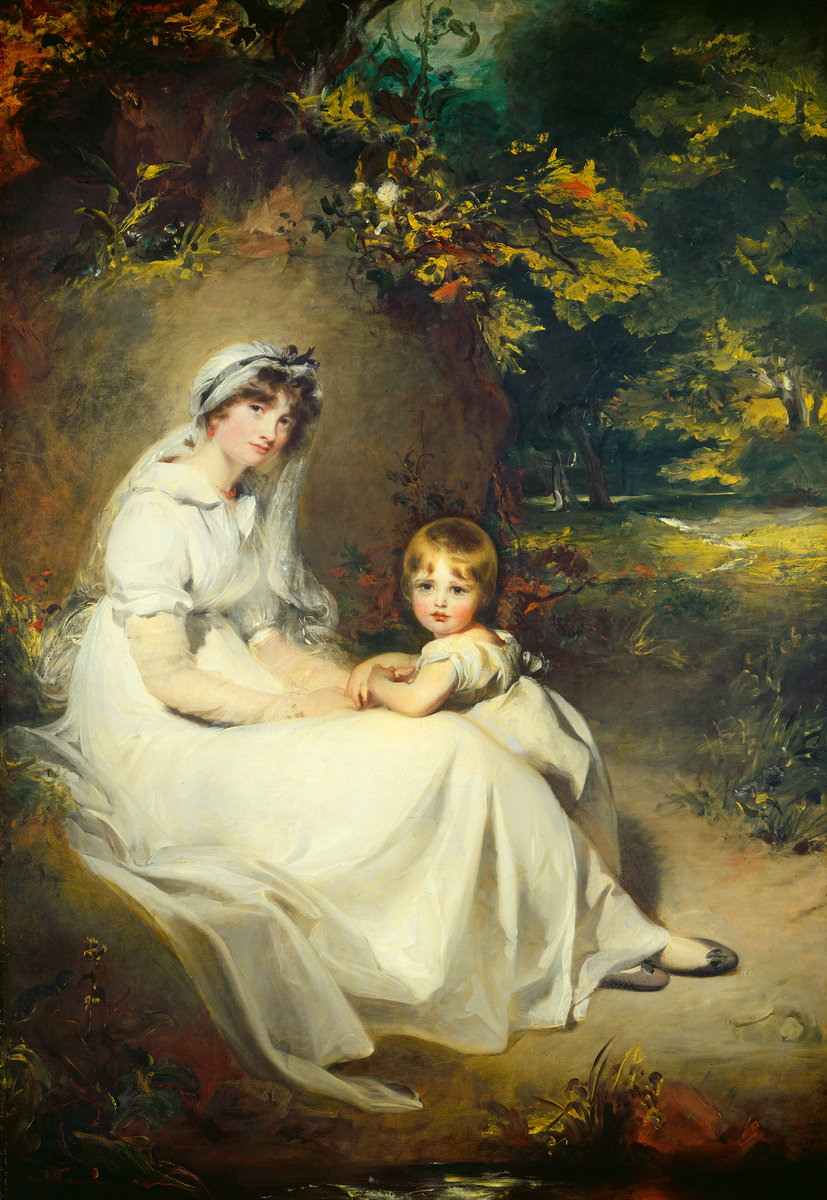
Lady Mary Templetown and Her Eldest Son by Thomas Lawrence

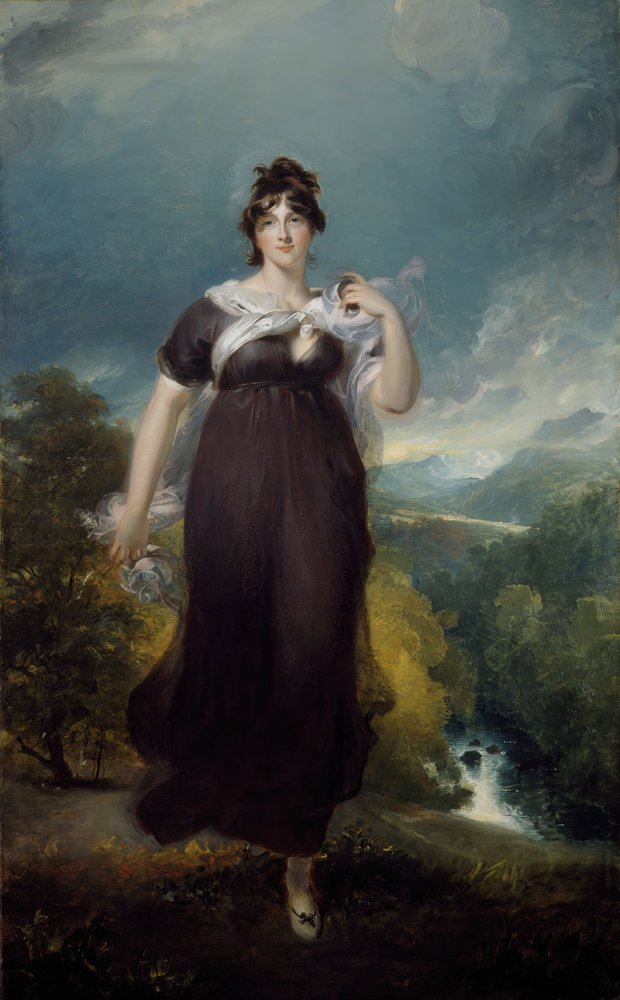
Portrait of Countess Conyngham by Thomas Lawrence

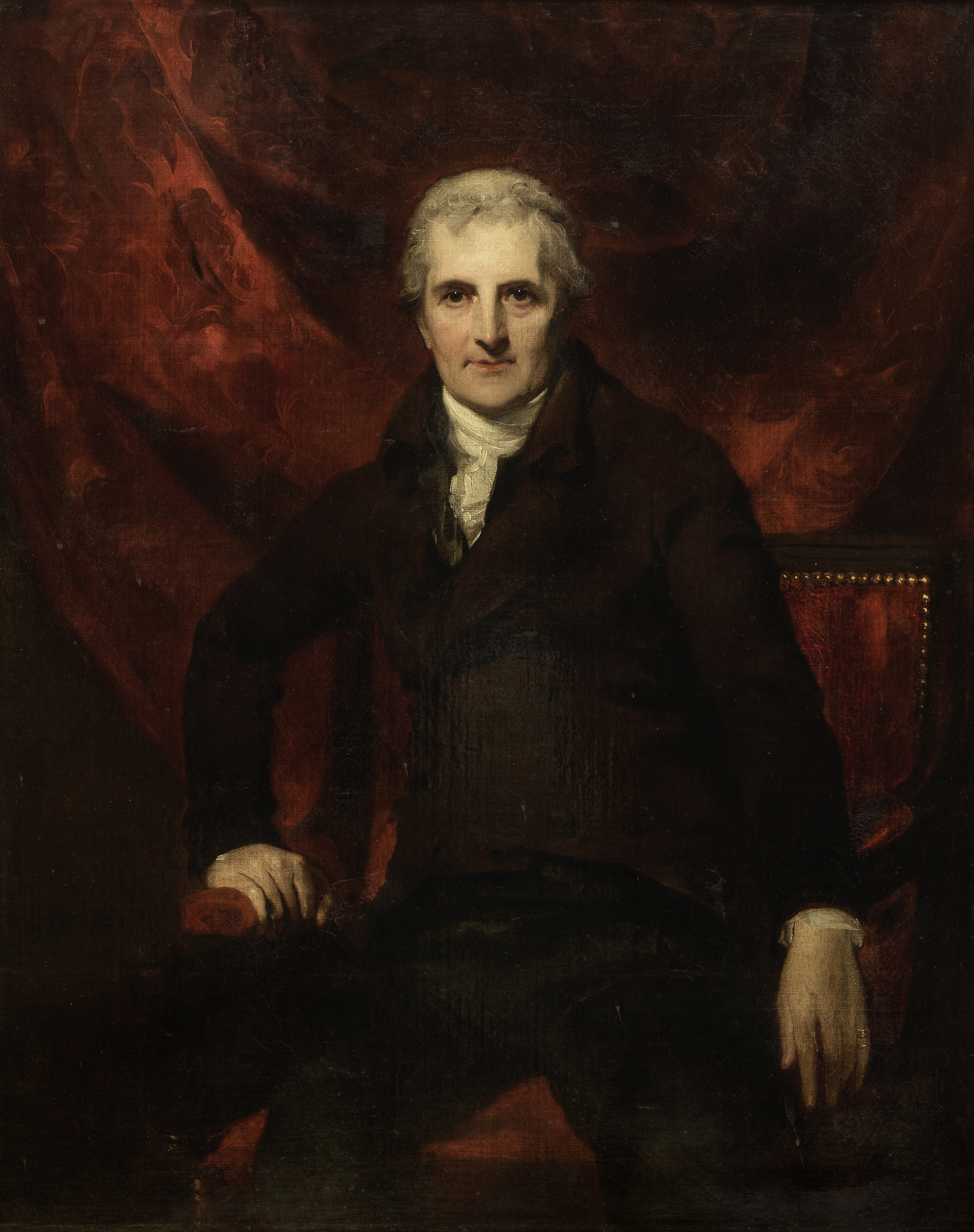
Portrait of George Griffin Stonestreet by Thomas Lawrence

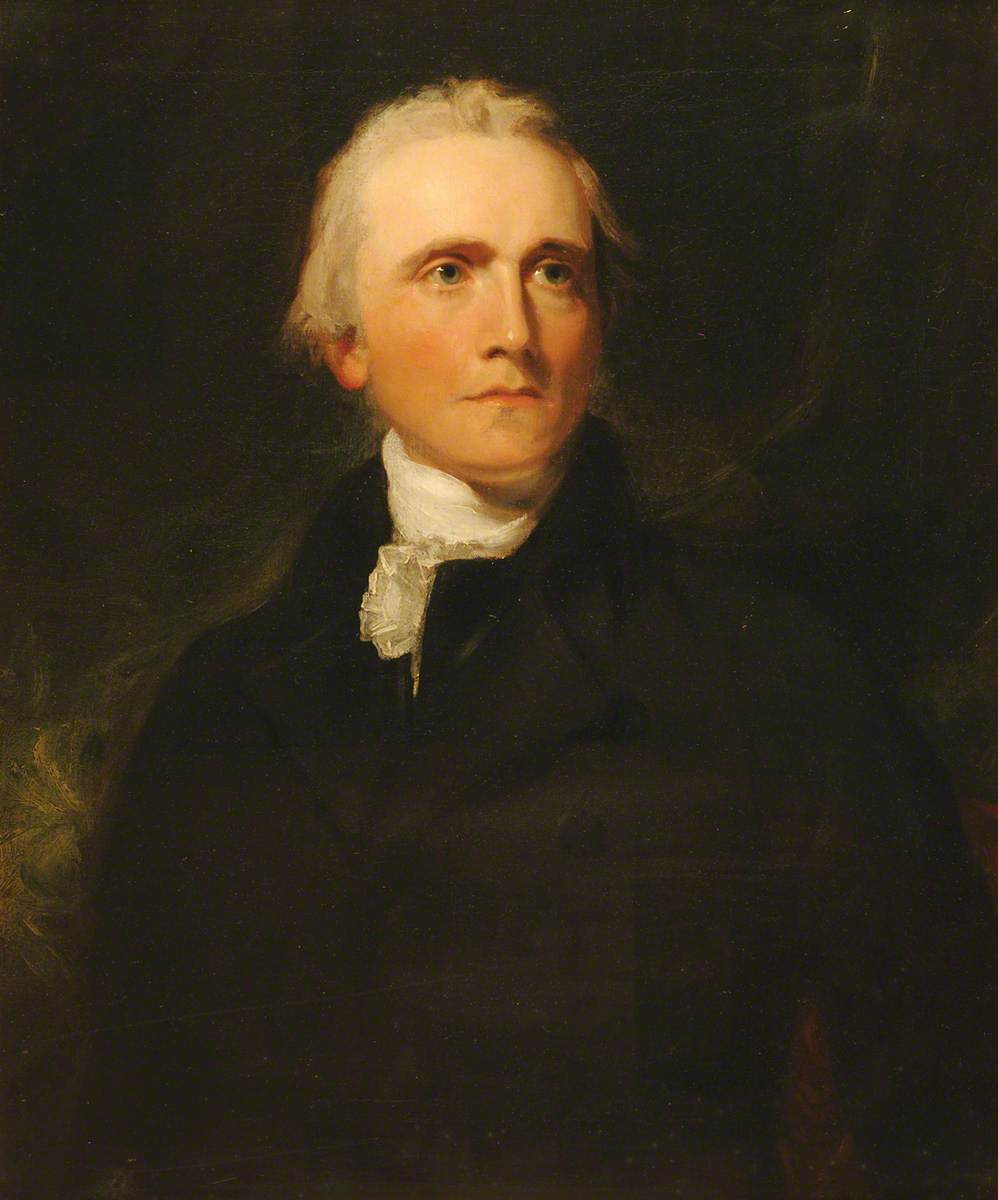
Portrait of William Grant by Thomas Lawrence

Portrait of the Marchioness of Exeter by Thomas Lawrence

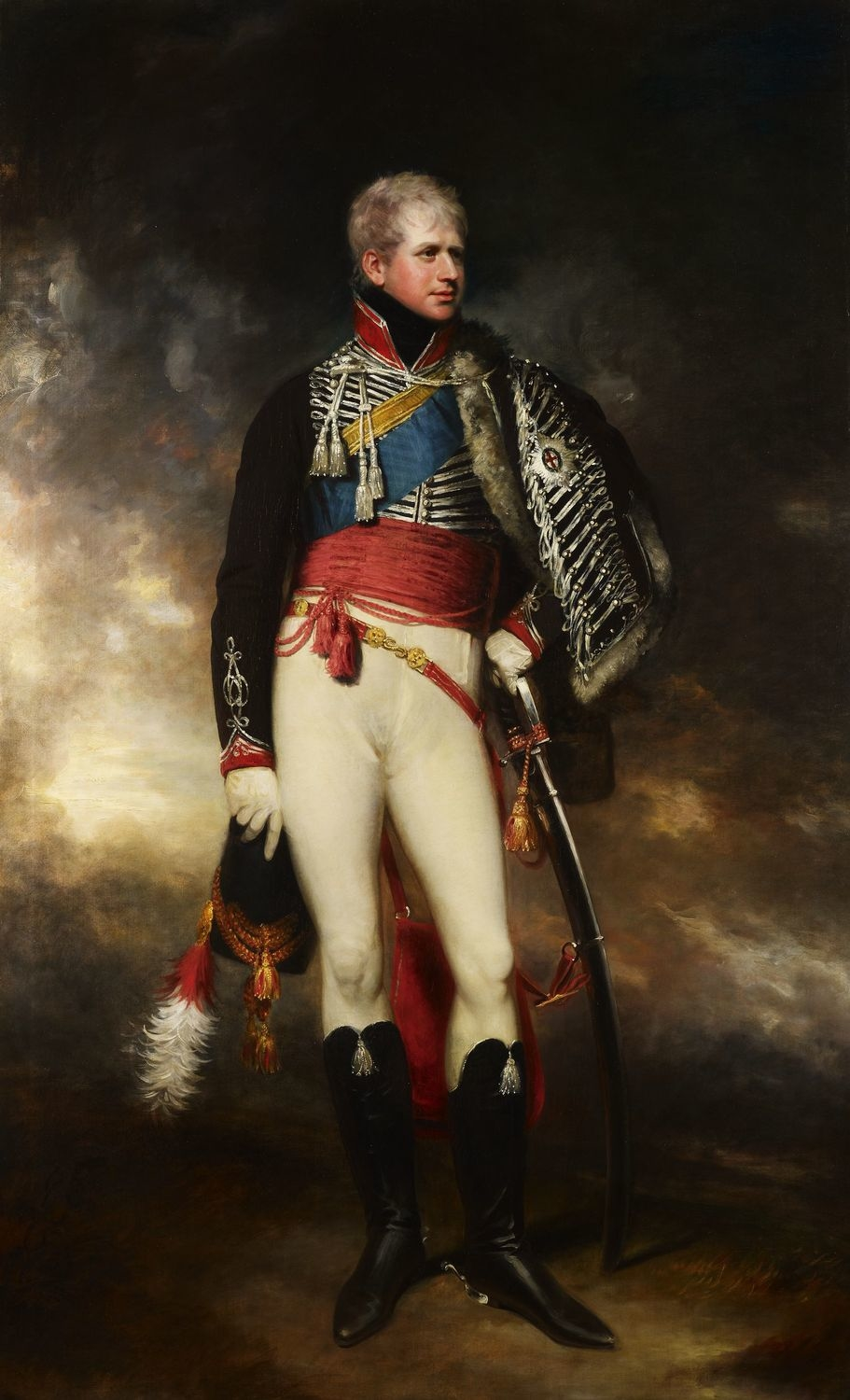
Portrait of Duke of Cumberland by William Beechey

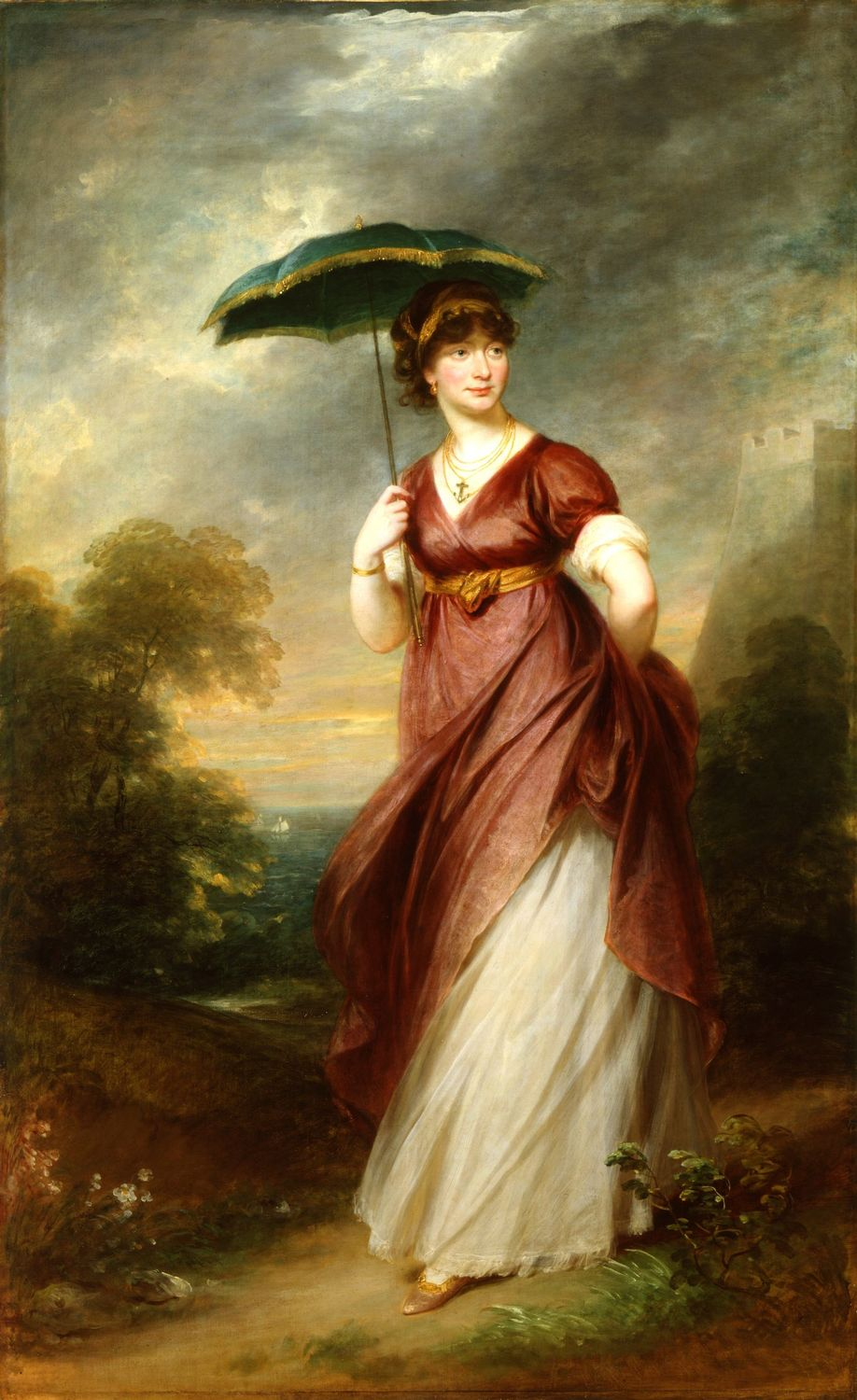
Portrait of Princess Augusta by William Beechey

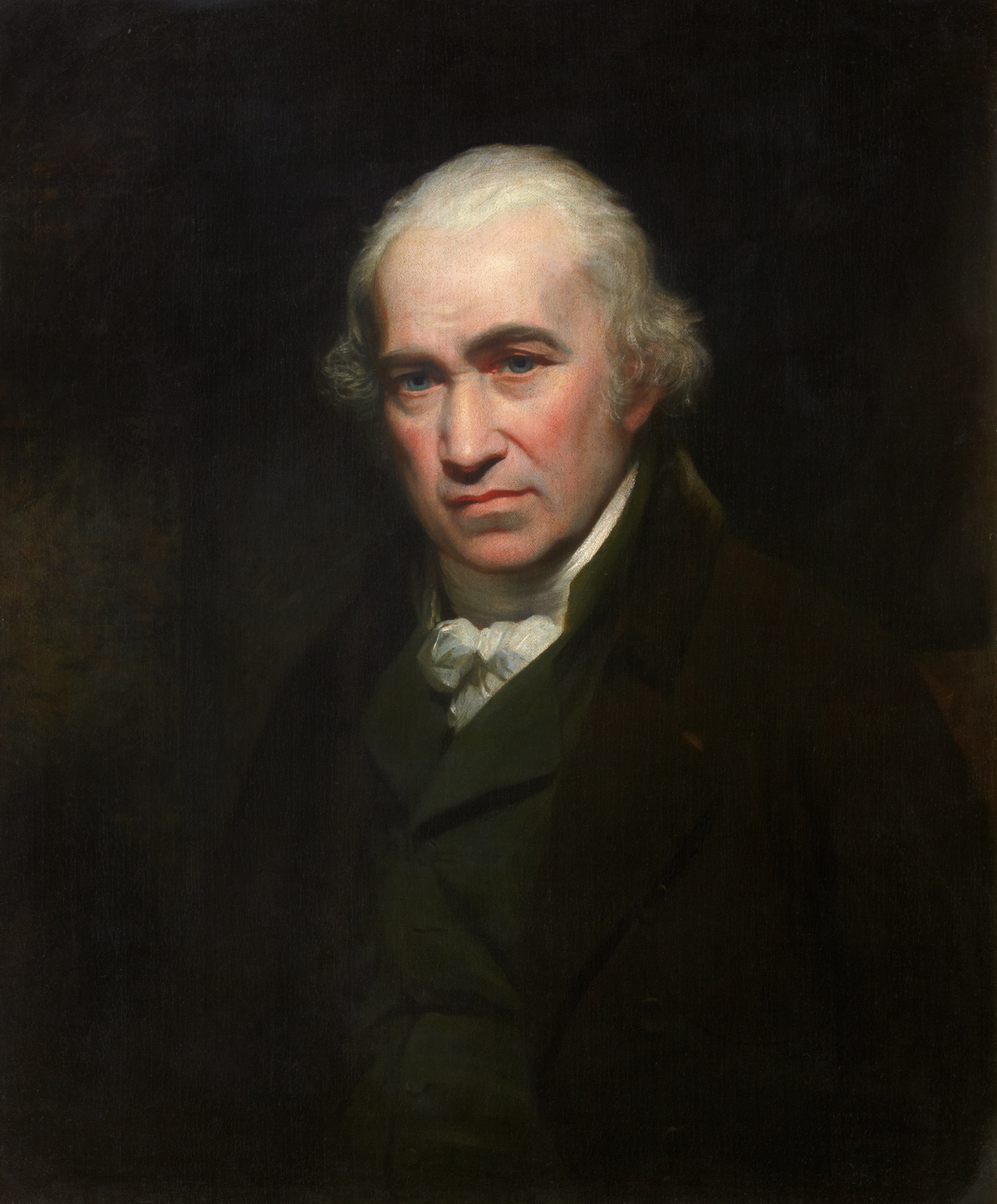
Portrait of James Watt by William Beechey

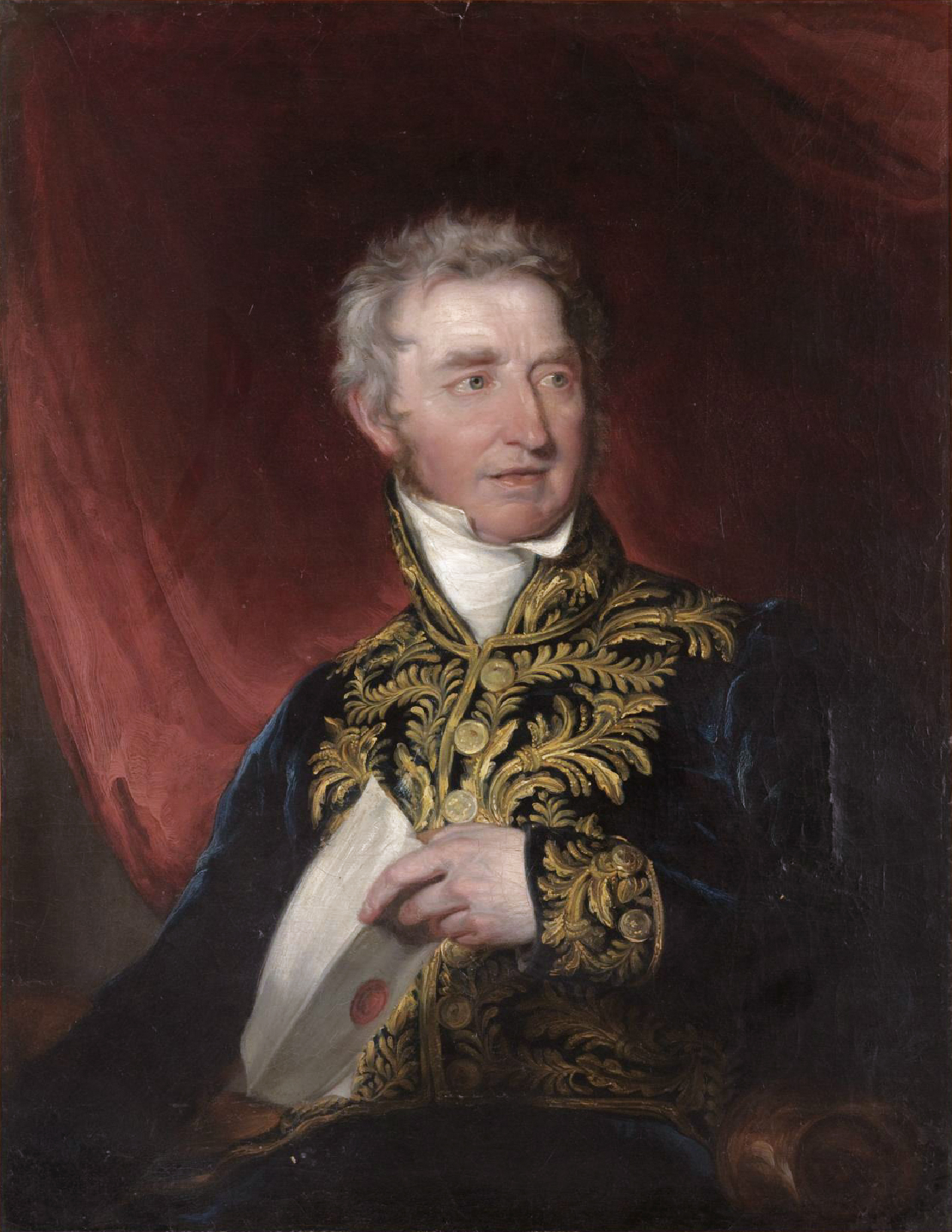
Portrait of William Hamilton by William Beechey

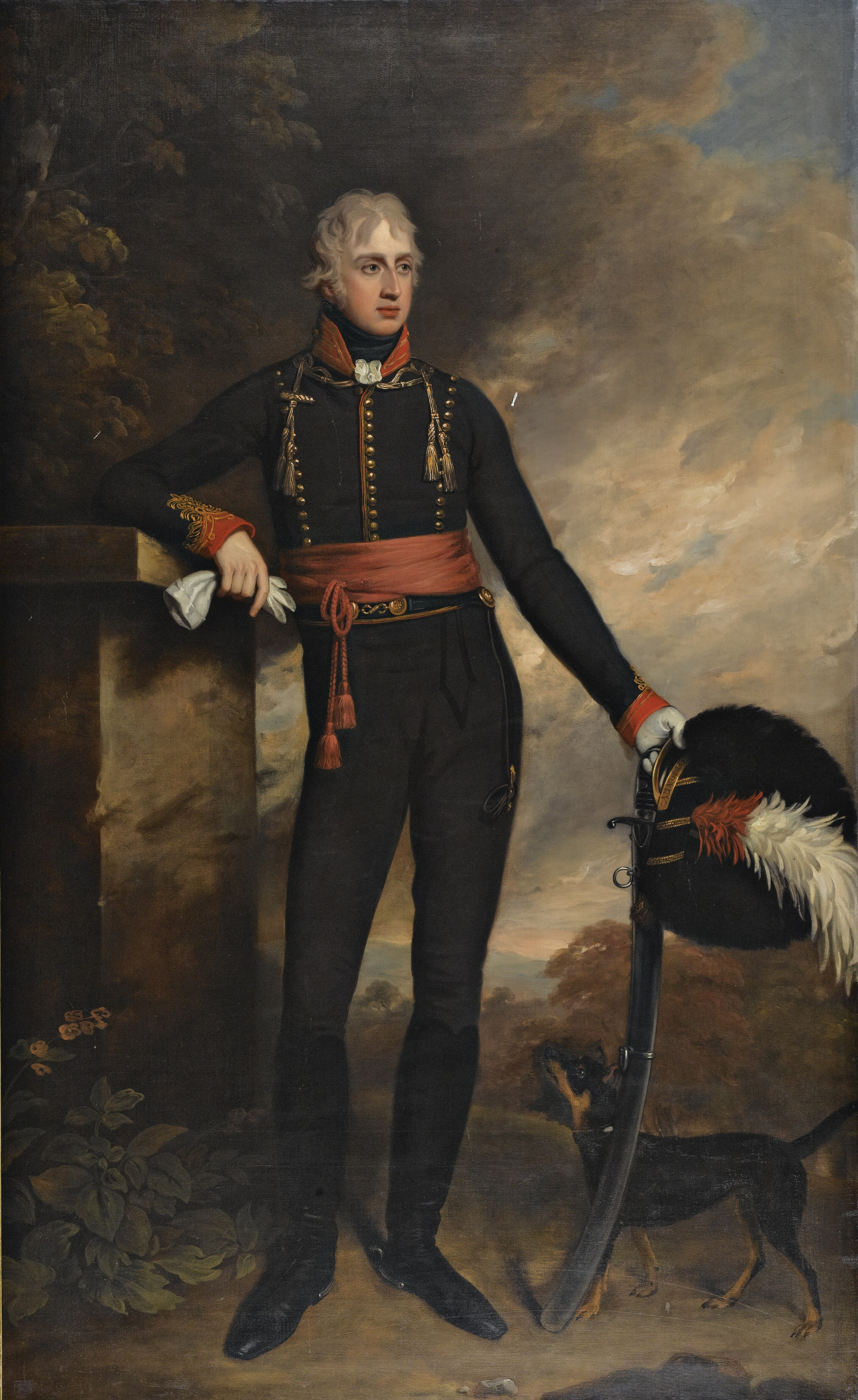
Portrait of Lord Bruce by Samuel Woodforde

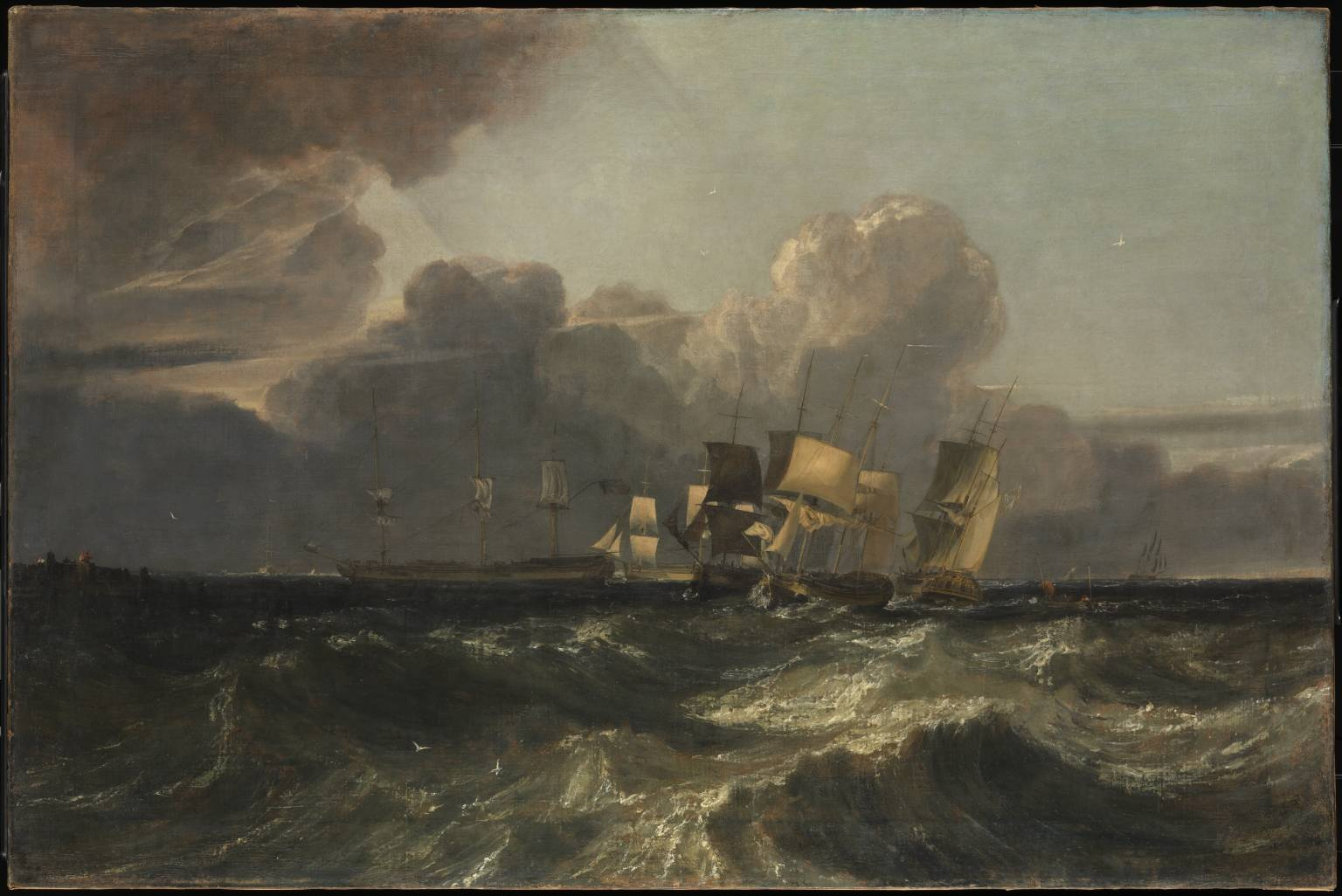
Ships Bearing up for Anchorage by J.M.W. Turner

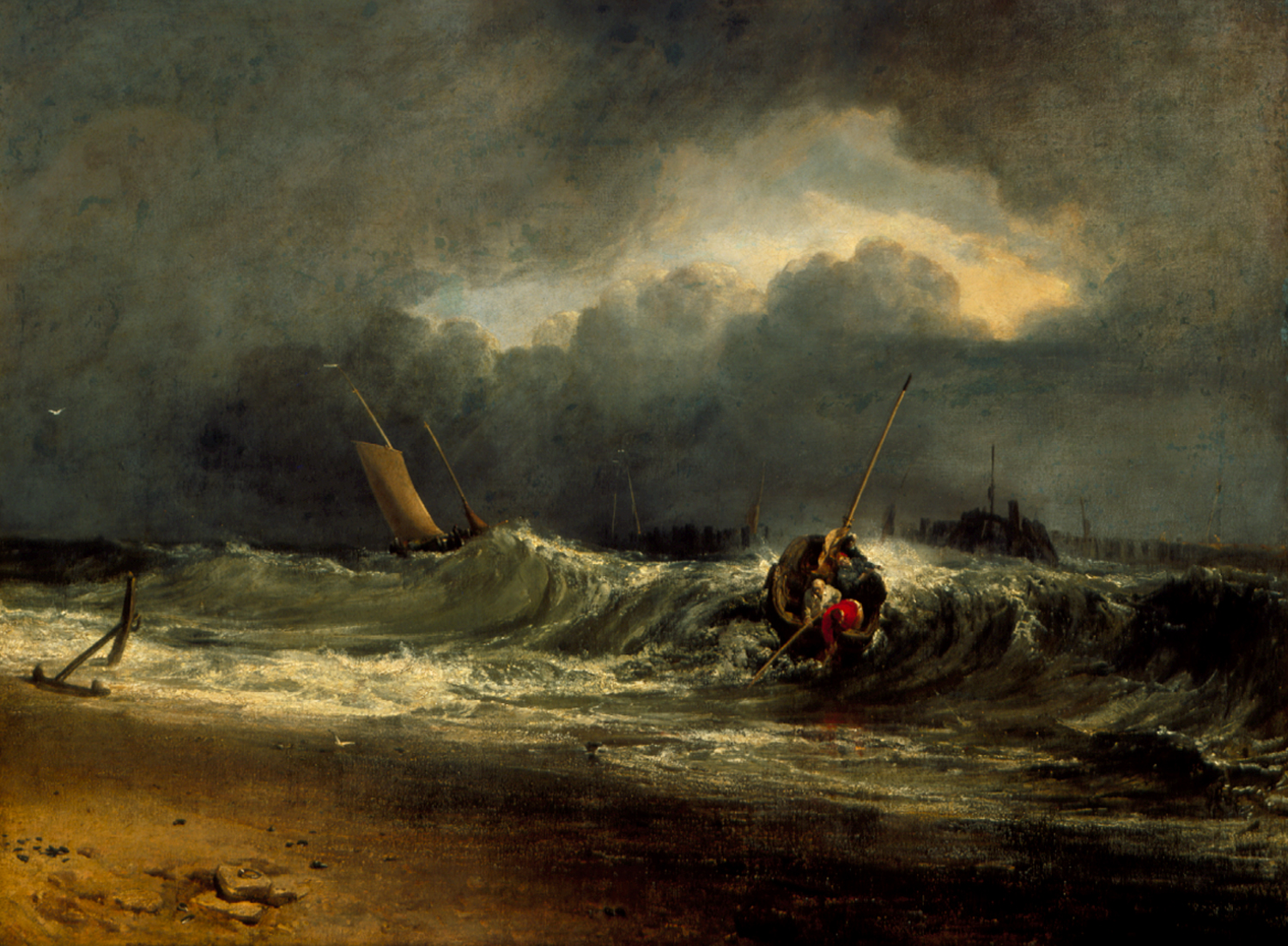
Fishermen Upon a Lee-Shore in Squally Weather by J.M.W. Turner

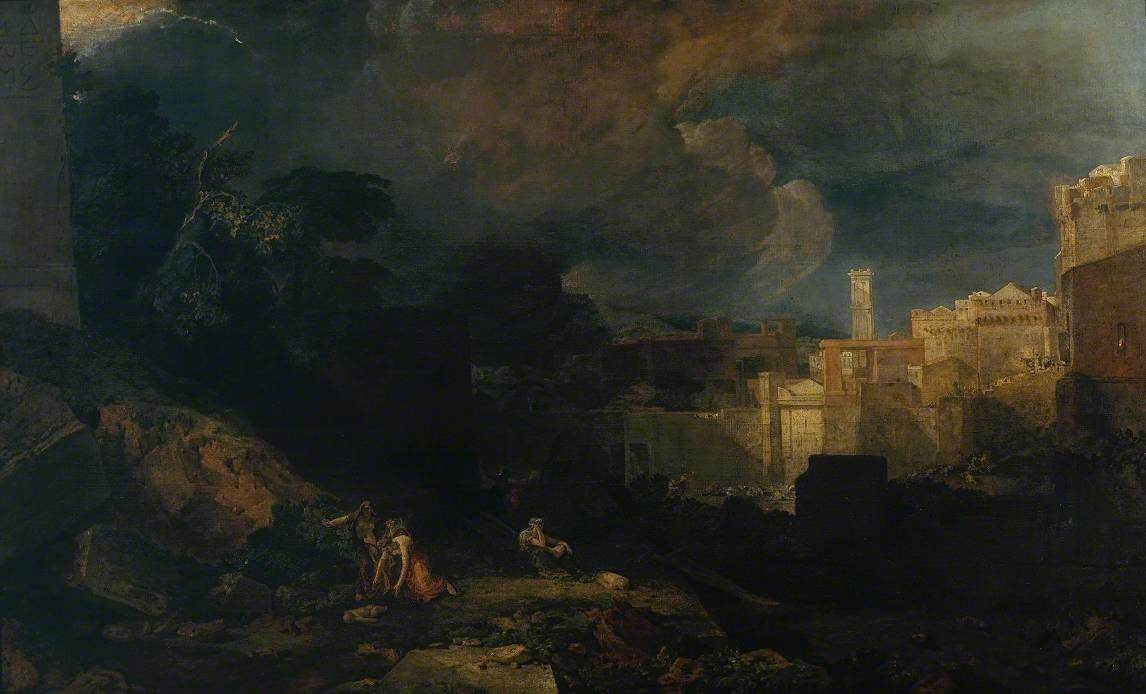
The Tenth Plague of Egypt by J.M.W. Turner

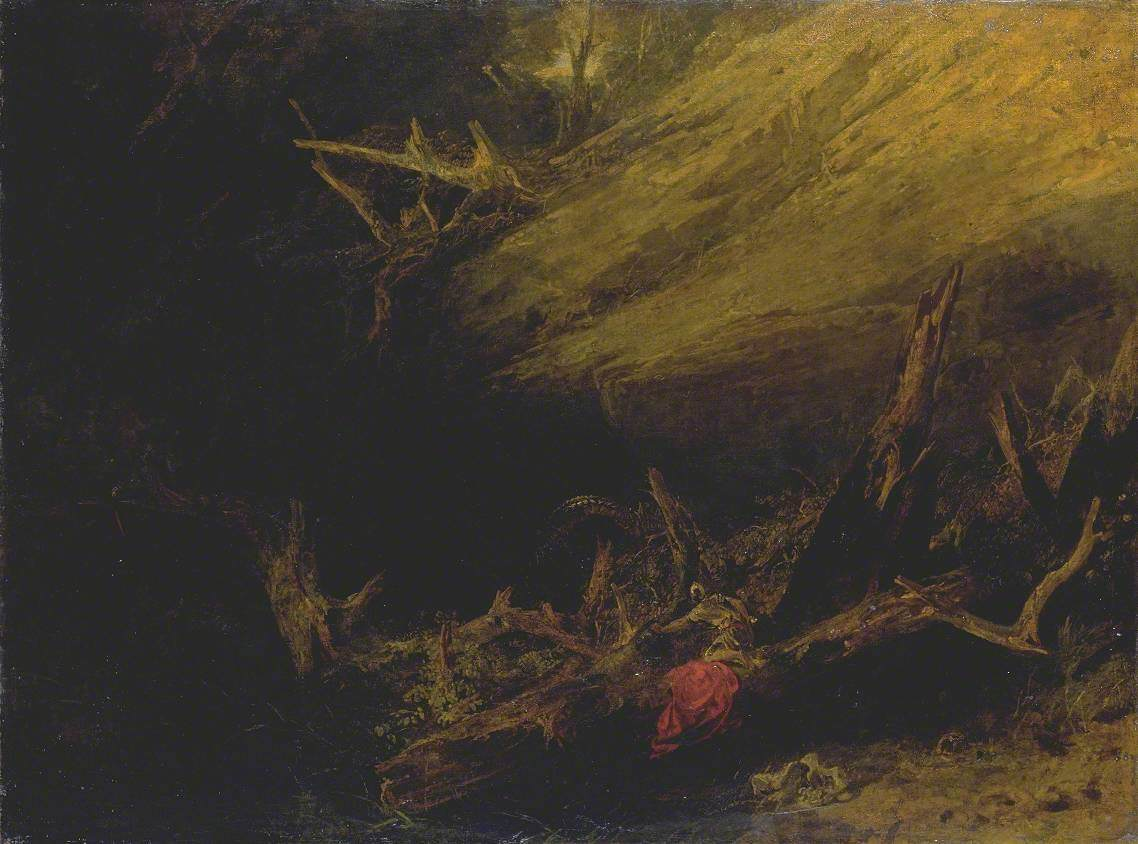
Jason by J.M.W. Turner

Ben Lomond Mountains by J.M.W. Turner

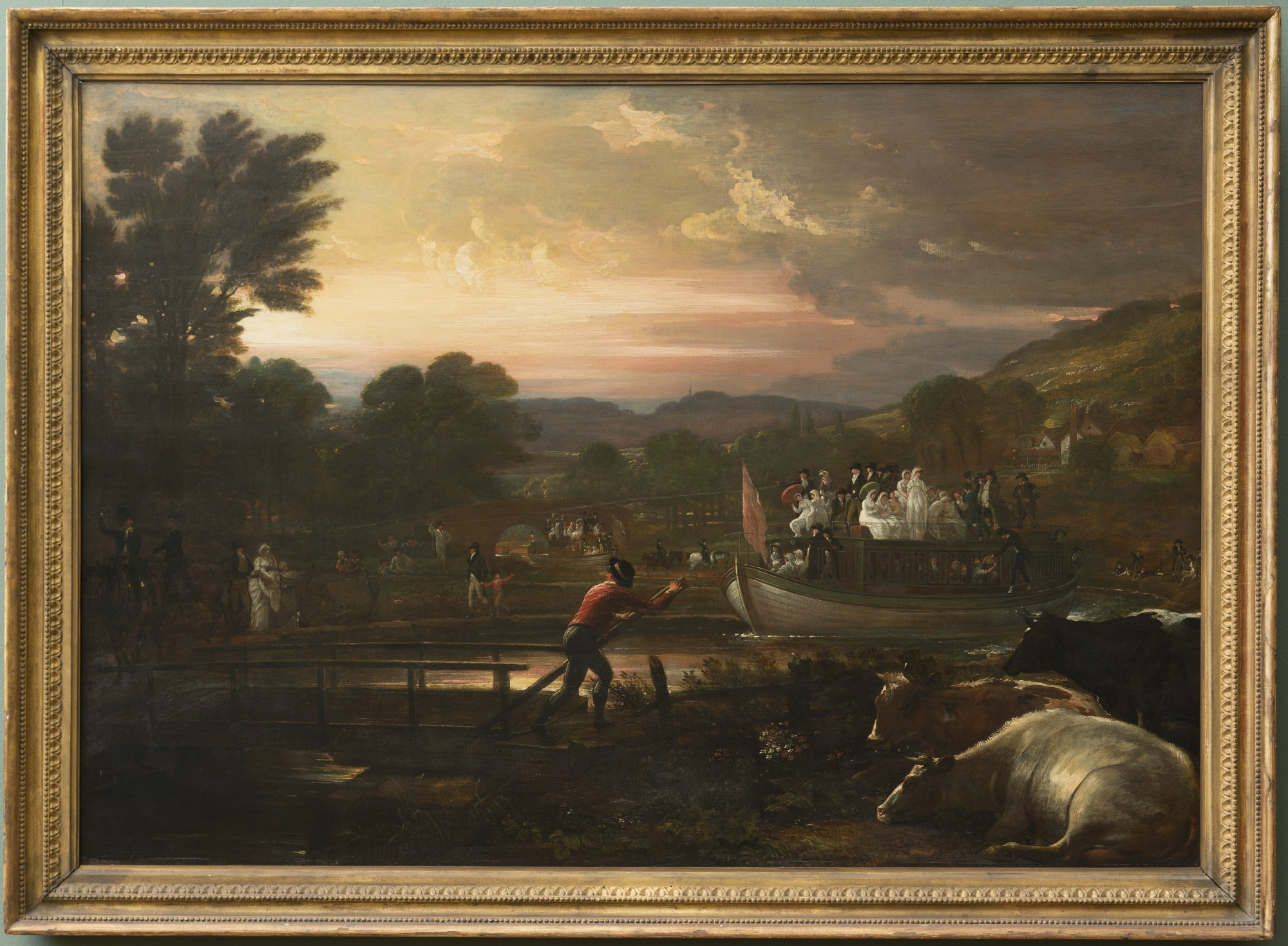
Paddington Canal by Benjamin West

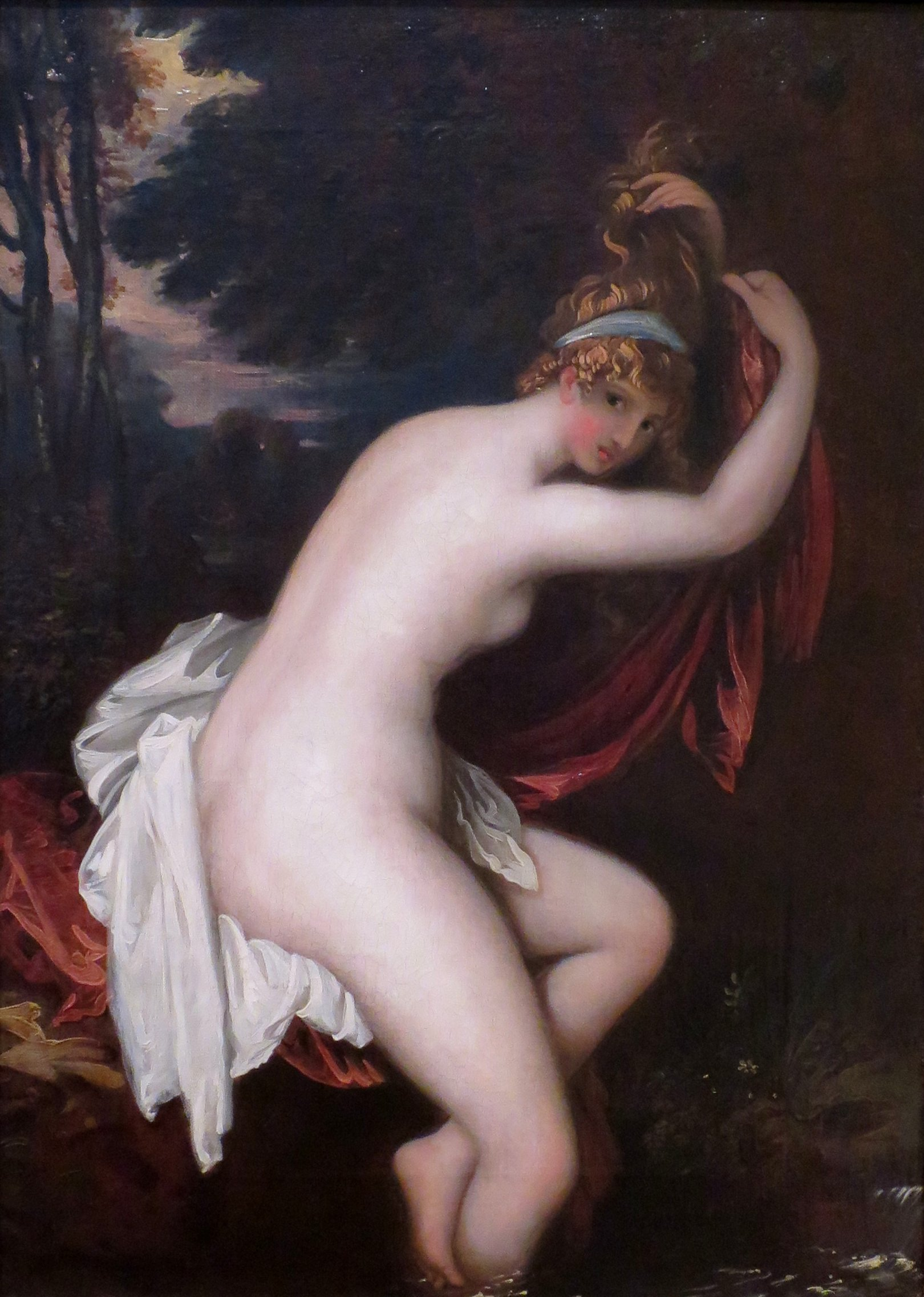
Arethusa by Benjamin West

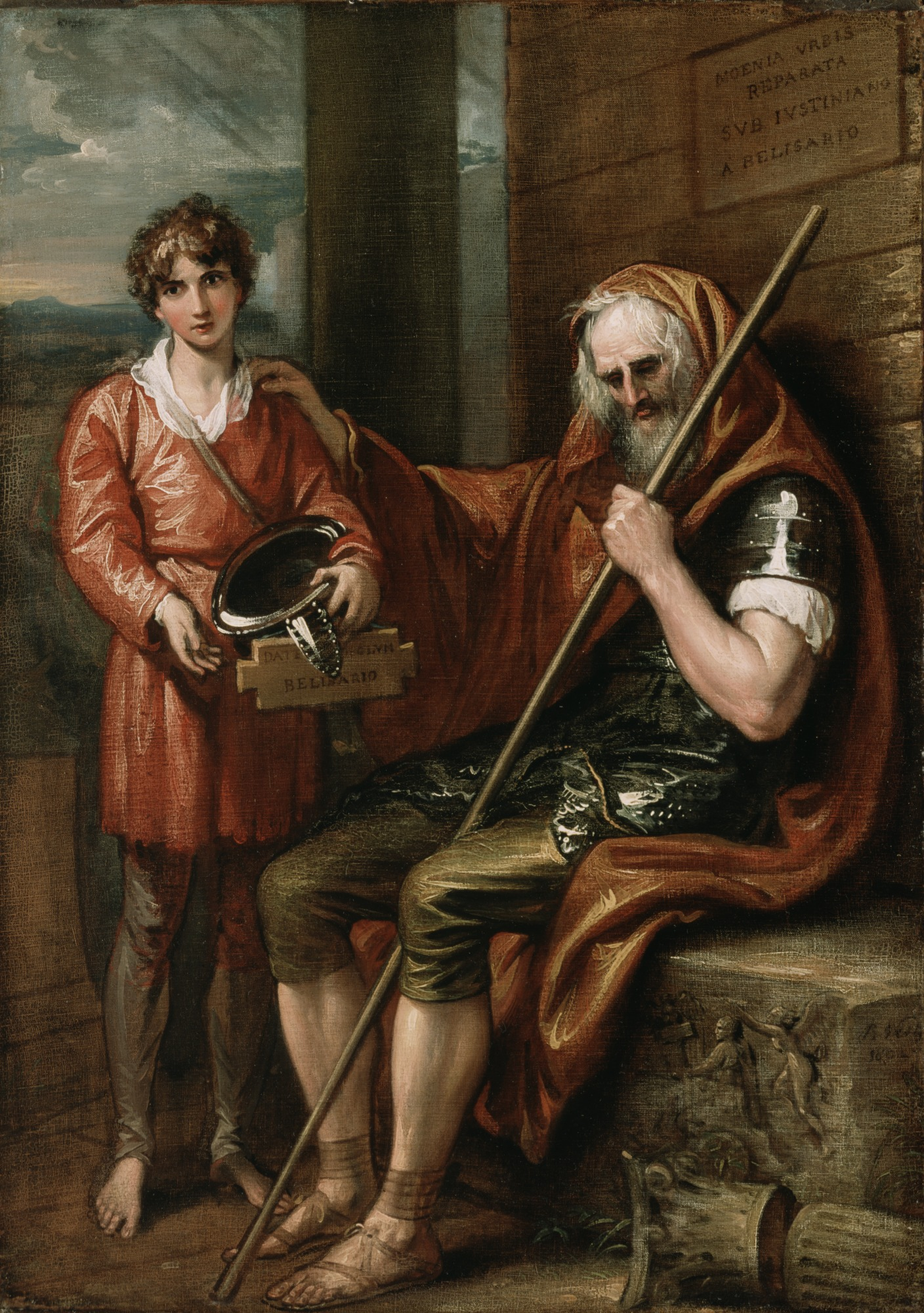
Belisarius and the Boy by Benjamin West

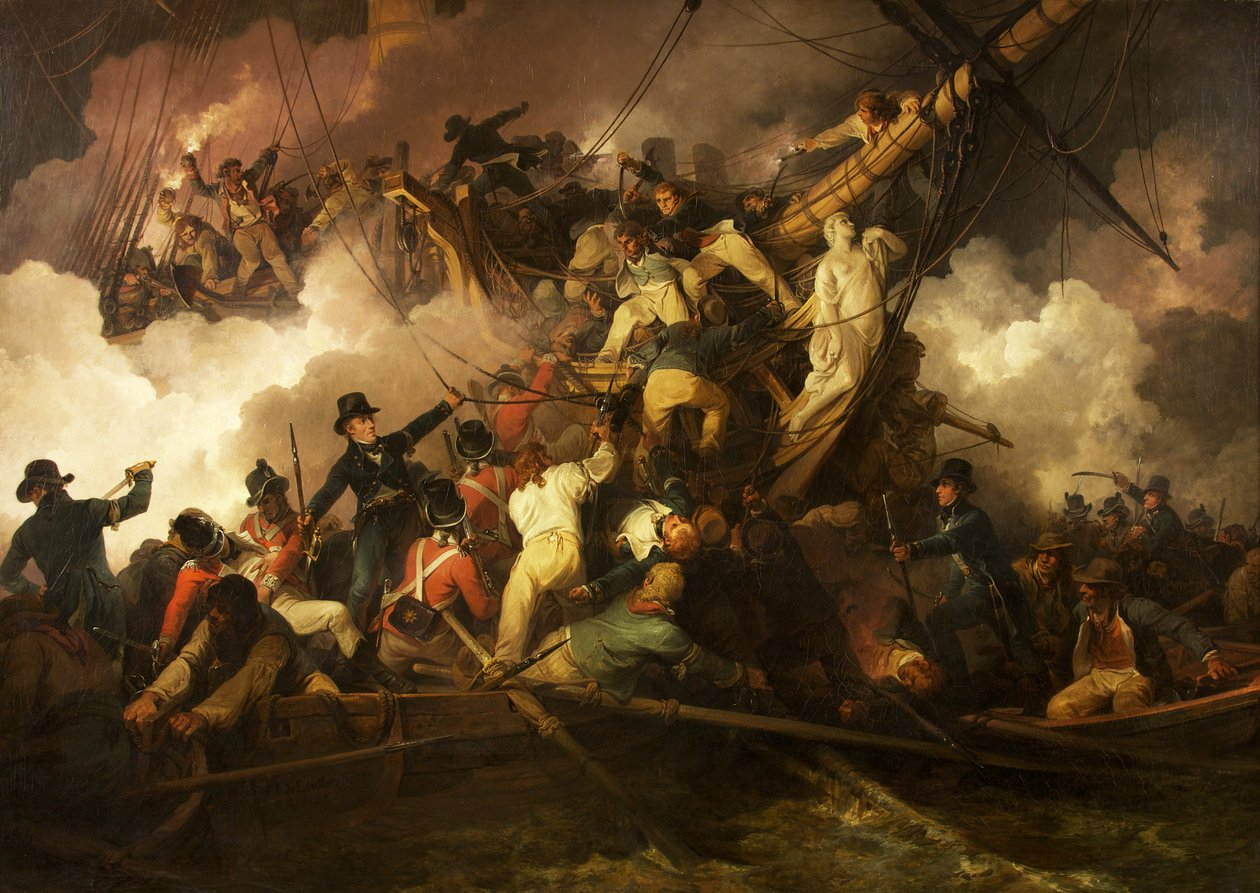
The Capture of the Chevrette by Philip James de Loutherbourg

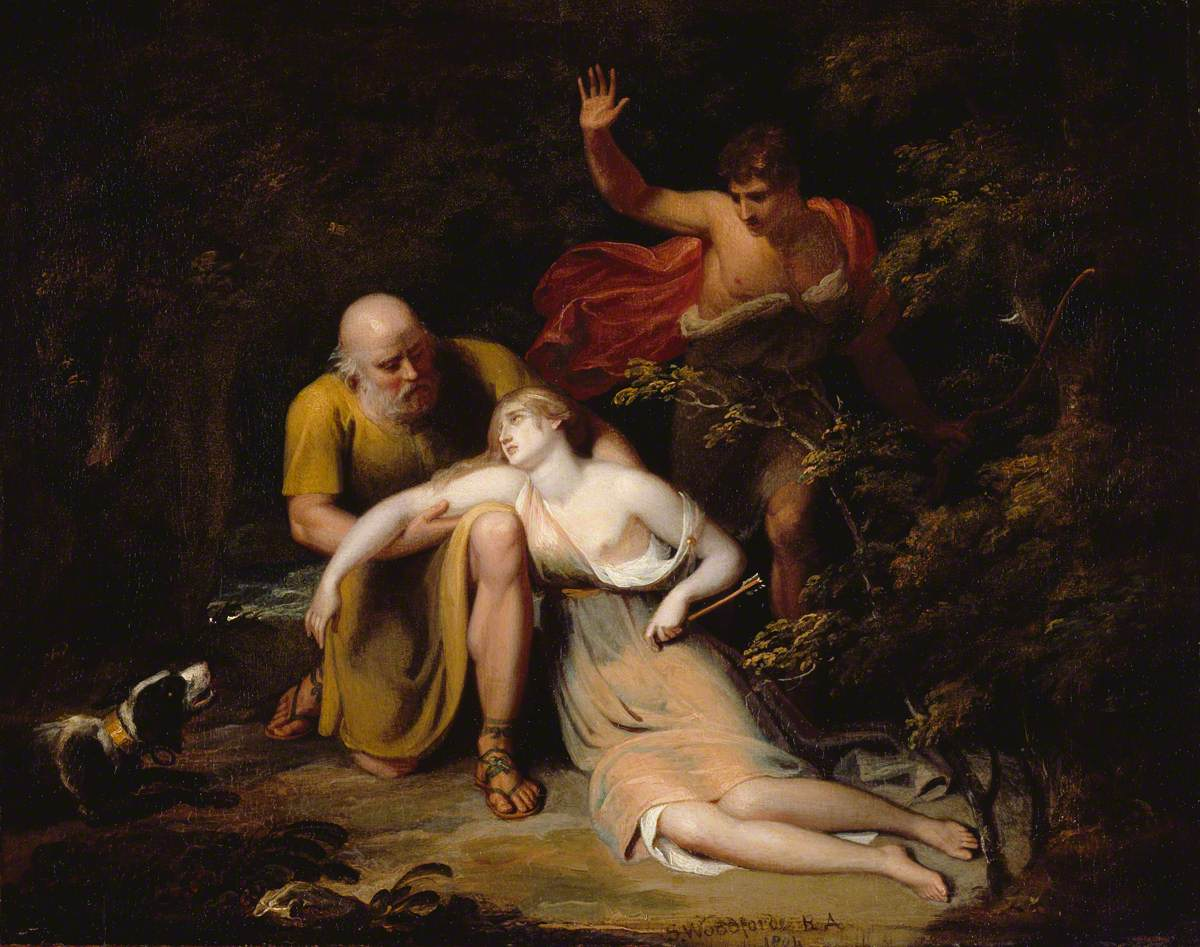
Dorinda, Wounded by Silvio, Is Sustained by Linco by Samuel Woodforde

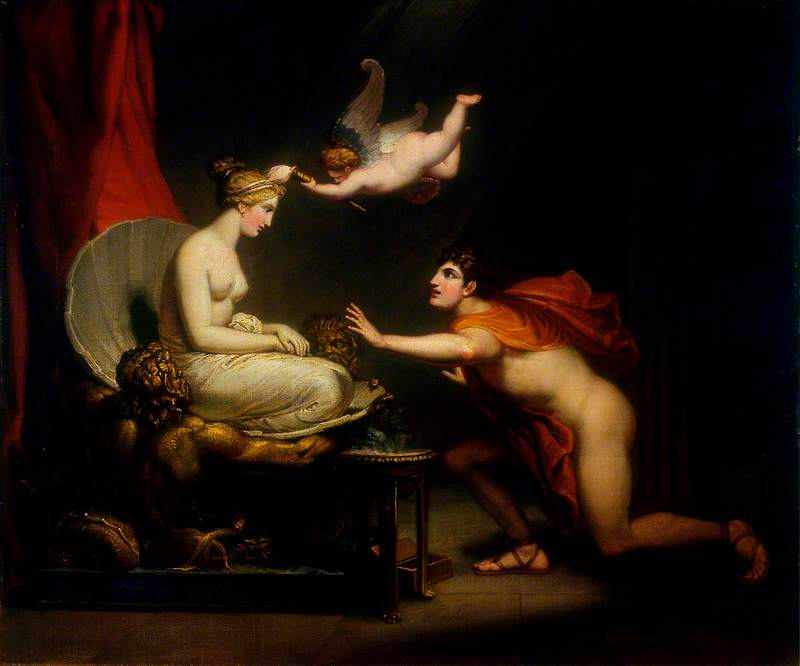
Love Animating Galatea, the Statue of Pygmalion by Henry Howard

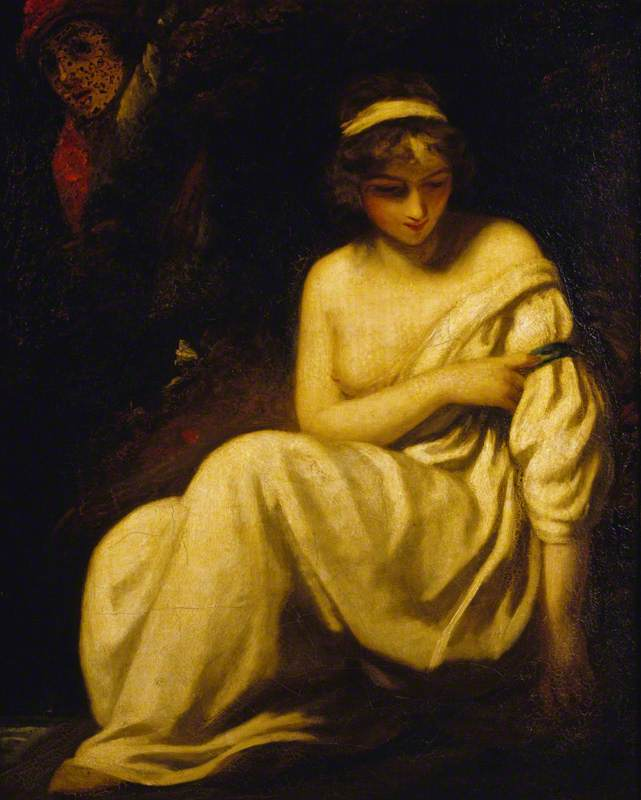
Damon and Musidora by John Opie

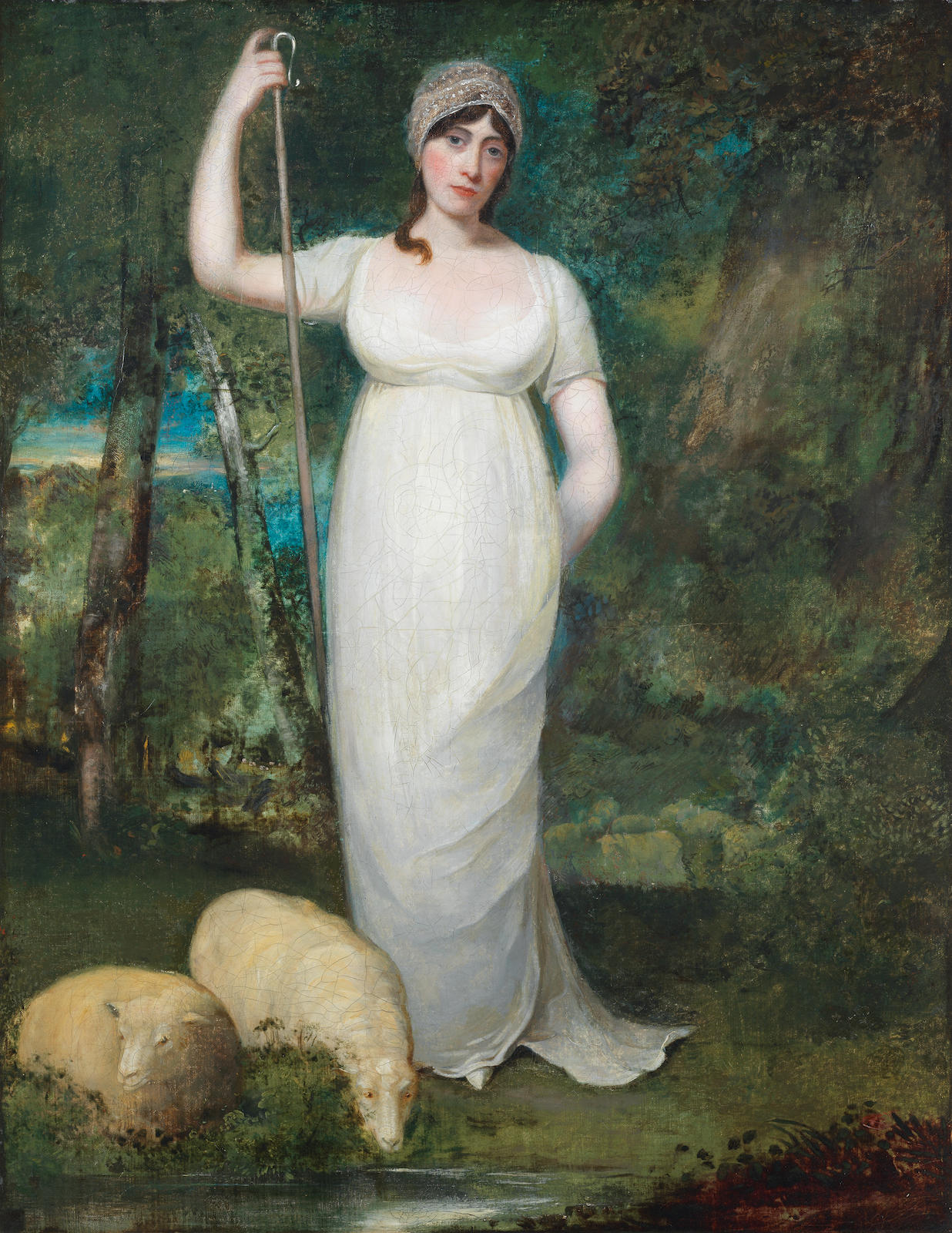
Frances Talbot as Lavinia by John Opie

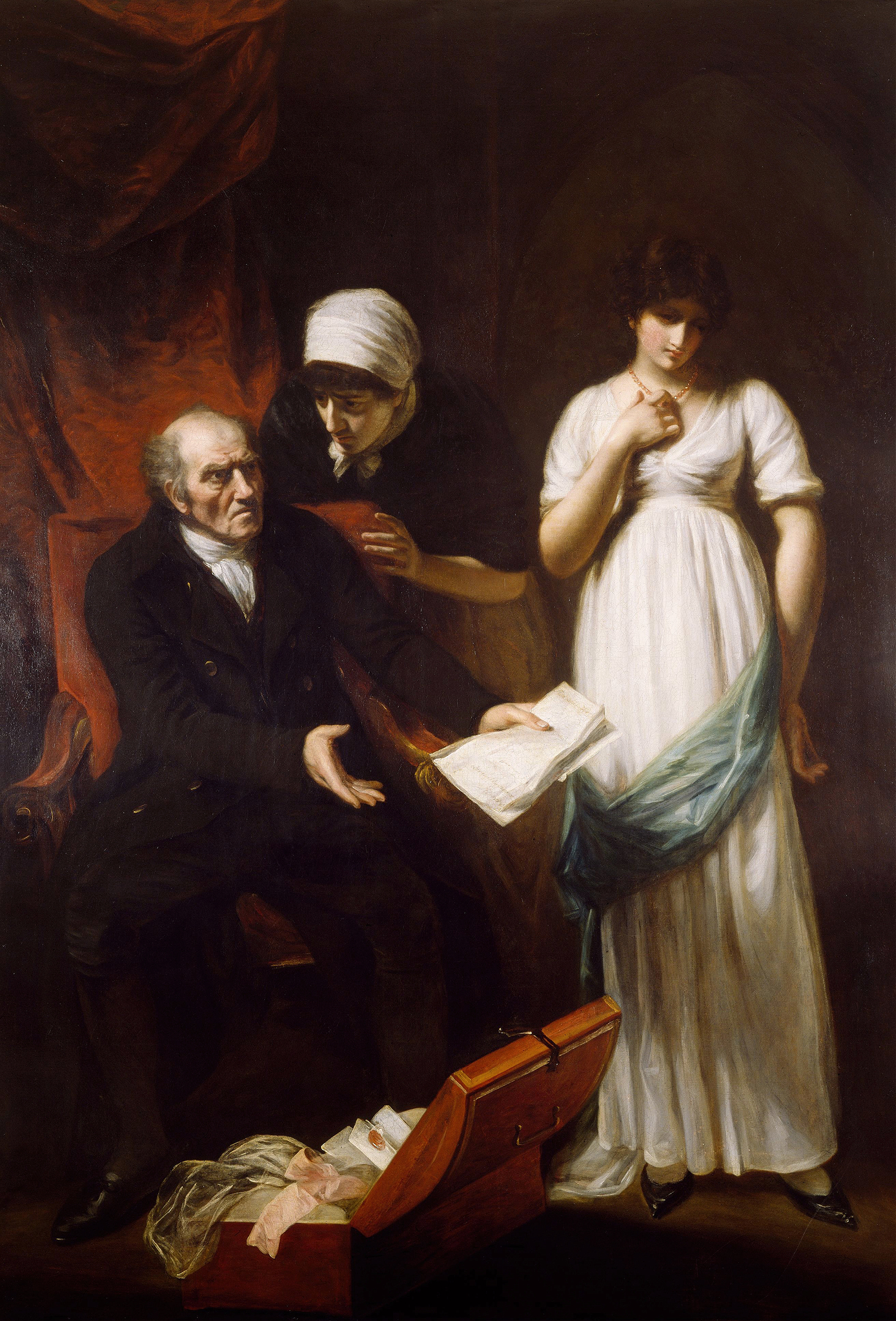
The Angry Father by John Opie

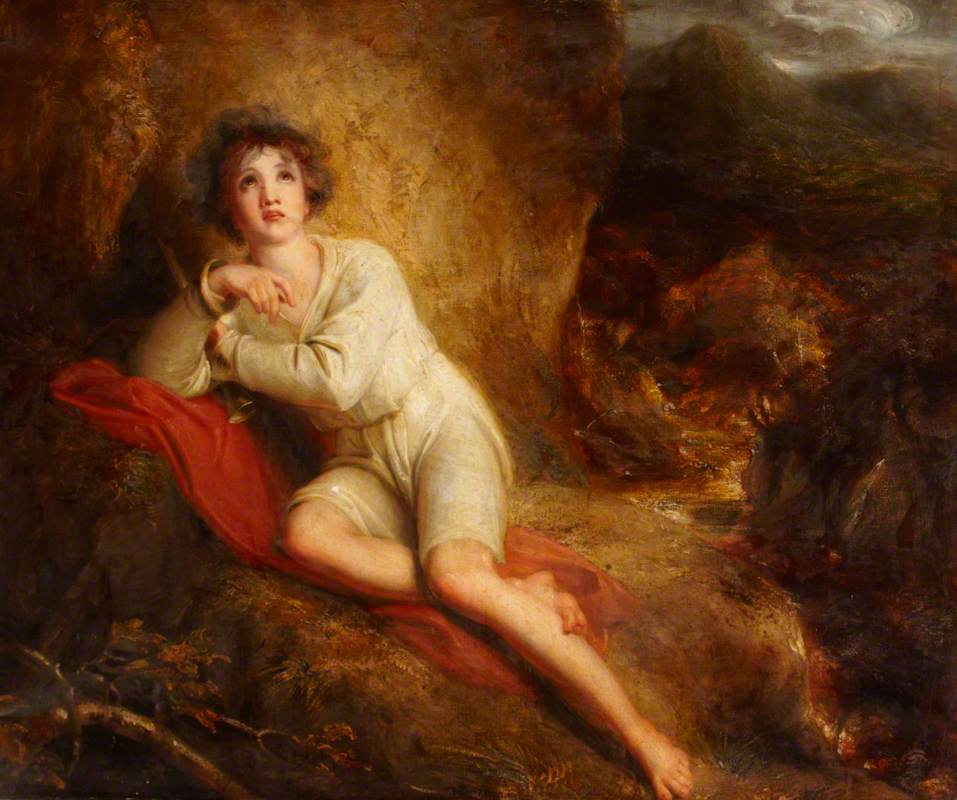
Edwin from The Minstrel by Richard Westall

== See also ==
- Salon of 1802, a French art exhibition held at the Louvre in Paris

== Bibliography ==
- Albinson, Cassandra, Funnell, Peter & Peltz, Lucy. Thomas Lawrence: Regency Power and Brilliance. Yale University Press, 2010.
- Bailey, Anthony. John Constable: A Kingdom of his Own. Random House, 2012.
- Bailey, Anthony. J.M.W. Turner: Standing in the Sun. Tate Enterprises Ltd, 2013.
- Levey, Michael. Sir Thomas Lawrence. Yale University Press, 2005.
- Spencer-Longhurst, Paul. The Sun Rising Through Vapour: Turner's Early Seascapes. Third Millennium Information, 2003.
- Tracy, Nicholas. Britannia's Palette: The Arts of Naval Victory. McGill-Queen's Press, 2007.
