= Portrait of Lady Maria Conyngham =

1825 painting by Thomas Lawrence

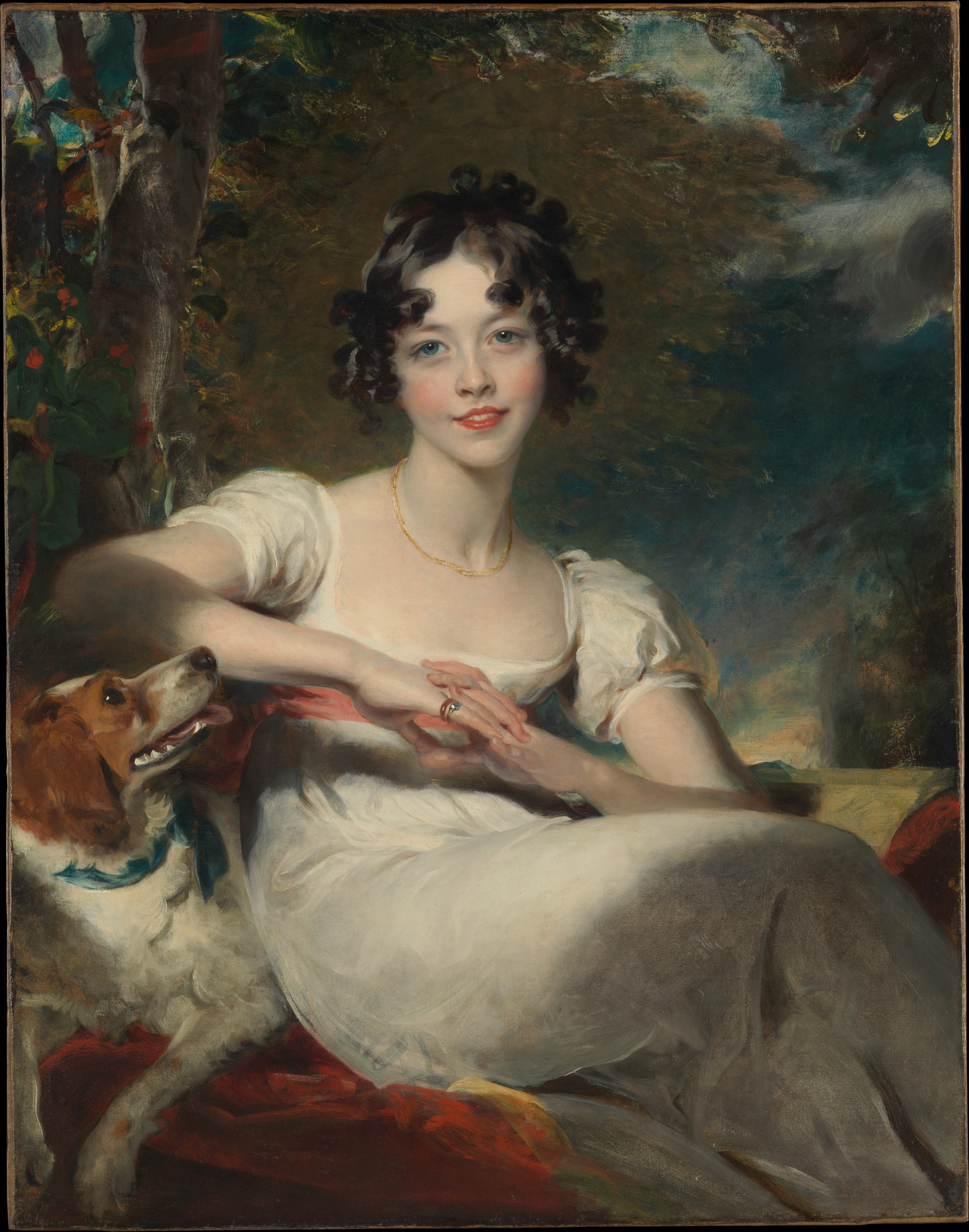
- Artist: Thomas Lawrence
- Year: 1824–25
- Type: Oil on canvas, portrait
- Dimensions: 92.1 cm × 71.8 cm (36.3 in × 28.3 in)
- Location: Metropolitan Museum of Art, New York

Portrait of Lady Maria Conyngham is an 1825 portrait painting by the British artist Sir Thomas Lawrence. It depicts Maria Conyingham, the younger of two daughters of the Anglo-Irish aristocrat Henry Conyngham, 1st Marquess Conyngham and his wife Elizabeth. Her mother was the mistress of George IV from 1820.

== History and description ==
Thomas Lawrence was the leading portraitist of the Regency era and President of the Royal Academy. He was commissioned to point portraits of the family. At the time of the Coronation of George IV in 1821, a portrait Maria's mother was painted by Lawrence and hung at the family's Irish residence Slane Castle. His 1823 portrait of Maria's brother Francis appeared the Summer Exhibition at Somerset House. George was emotionally close to all the Conyngham family, but Maria was a particular favourite of his.

Maria was around fourteen when Lawrence painted her. He includes a pet dog on the left of the picture which is less formal than the paintings of her mother and sister Elizabeth, although all three are dressed in white. George paid the artist £210 for the work. It was hung in the bedroom at the St James's Palace along with Lawrence's painting of her mother and his Portrait of Princess Sophia the king's sister. In 1832 she married William Somerville. The painting is today in the collection of the Metropolitan Museum of Art in New York, having been acquired in 1955.

== See also ==
- Portrait of Countess Conyngham, an 1802 painting of her mother by Thomas Lawrence

== Bibliography ==
- Ambrose, Tom. The King and the Vice Queen: George IV's Last Scandalous Affair. Sutton Publishing, 2005.
- Baetjer, Katharine. British Paintings in the Metropolitan Museum of Art, 1575-1875. Metropolitan Museum of Art, 2009.
- Levey, Michael. Sir Thomas Lawrence. Yale University Press, 2005.
- Smith, E.A. George IV. Yale University Press, 1999.
