= Niccolò Carissa =

Italian painter

Niccolò Carissa (born 1730, date of death unknown) was an Italian painter who produced several still-life paintings of flowers, vegetables, and birds. He worked in Rome and Naples.
