= The Capture of the Chevrette =

Painting by Philip James de Loutherbourg

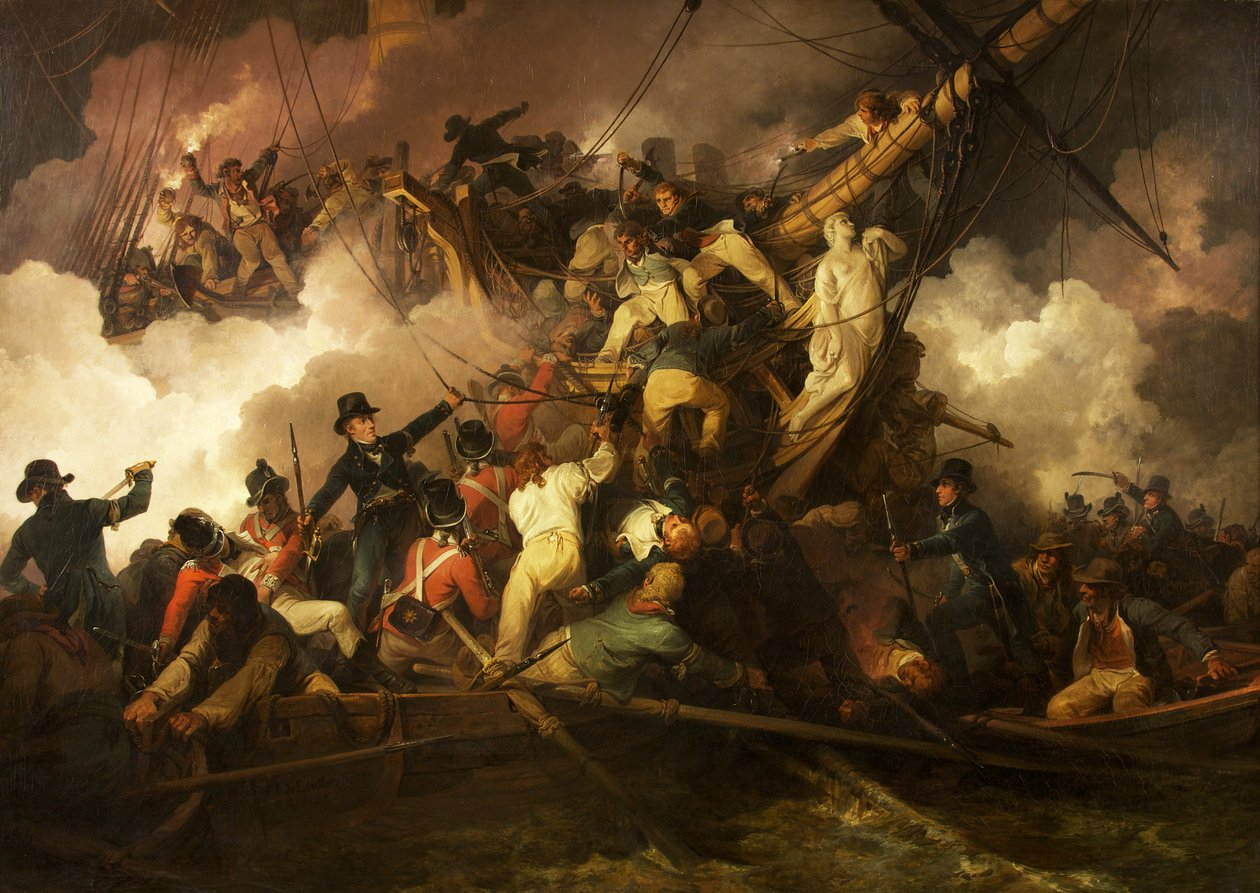
- Artist: Philip James de Loutherbourg
- Year: 1802
- Type: Oil on canvas, history painting
- Dimensions: 152 cm × 165 cm (60 in × 65 in)
- Location: Bristol Museum and Art Gallery, Bristol

The Capture of the Chevrette is an oil on canvas history painting by the French-born British artist Philip James de Loutherbourg, from 1802.

== History and description ==
The painting depicts the capture of the French Navy corvette Chevrette by a British cutting out party in 1801 during the French Revolutionary Wars. Chevrette was moored in Camaret Bay, Brittany under the protection of nearby shore batteries. Ship's boats from four ships of the Royal Navy squadron blockading Brest, HMS Robust, Doris, HMS Beaulieu and HMS Uranie, stormed Chevrette and overpowered its crew before sailing the captured ship out of the bay.

It was exhibited at the Royal Academy's Summer Exhibition of 1802 at Somerset House. Today the painting is in the collection of the Bristol Museum and Art Gallery. The Scottish artist John Christian Schetky also painted the engagement, a copy of which is now in the National Maritime Museum in Greenwich.

== Bibliography ==
- Shaw, Philip. Studies in Culture and Conflict, 1793–1822. Taylor & Francis, 2017.
- Tracy, Nicholas. Britannia’s Palette: The Arts of Naval Victory. McGill-Queen's Press, 2007.
