= Salisbury Cathedral from the Cloisters =

Painting by J. M. W. Turner

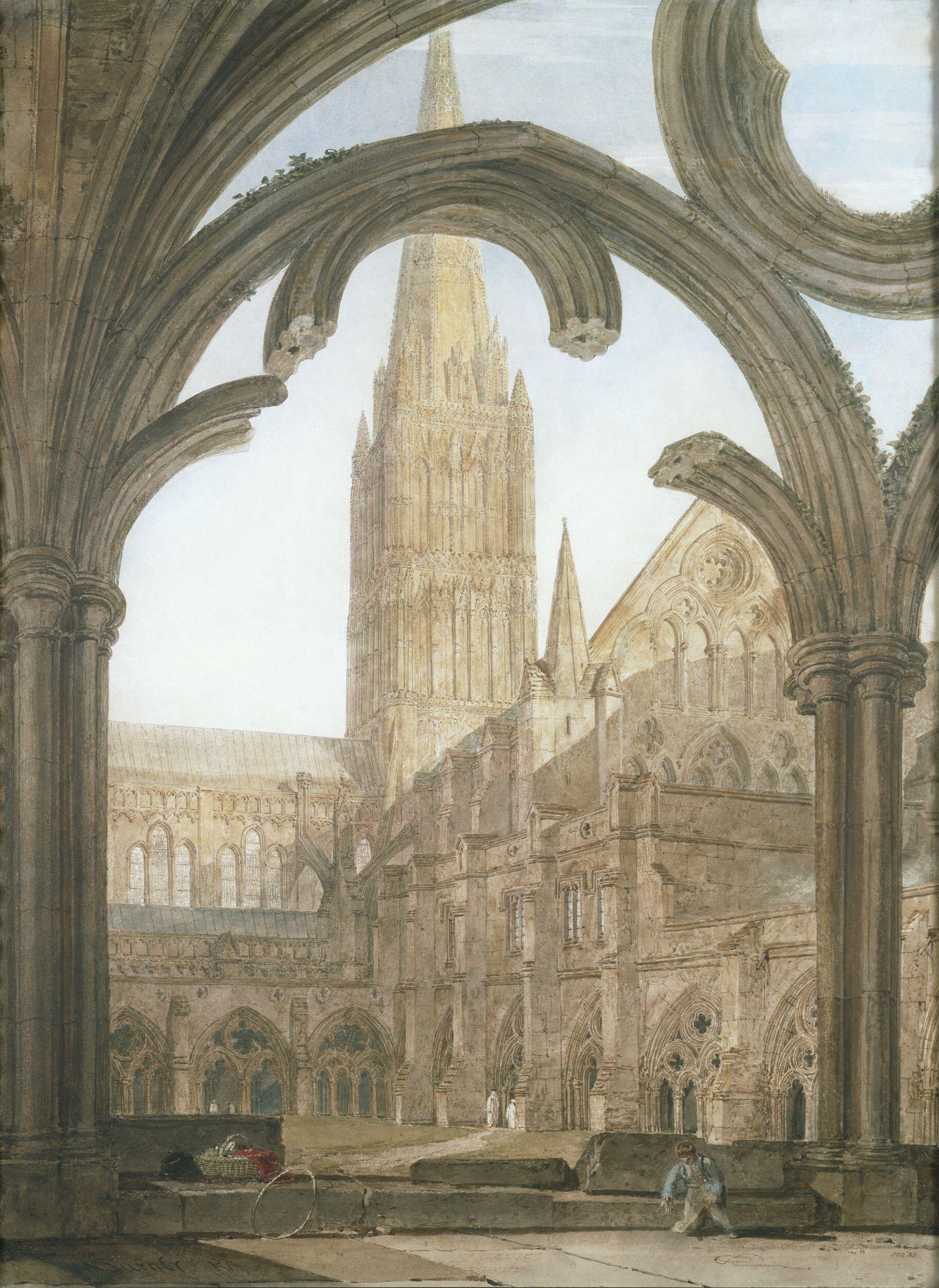
- Artist: J. M. W. Turner
- Year: 1802
- Type: Watercolour, landscape painting
- Dimensions: 88.8 cm × 72.5 cm (35.0 in × 28.5 in)
- Location: Victoria and Albert Museum, London

South View of Salisbury Cathedral from the Cloisters is an 1802 watercolour painting by the British artist J.M.W. Turner. It features a view of Salisbury Cathedral, framed by a ruined stone archway.

The young Turner had visited Salisbury in Wiltshire in 1795 and made extensive sketches. The painting was commissioned by the art collector Sir Richard Hoare as part of a series of views of the city. To expand it beyond a simple topographical study, Turner added a boy playing with a hoop in the cloisters. Hoare planned to produce a series of published prints base on this and other views of the cathedral. While this didn't materialise, this and nine other views of the cathedral were framed and hung at the fashionable country house Stourhead.

Salisbury Cathedral subsequently became associated with Turner's rival John Constable who painted it frequently due to his association with the bishop John Fisher.

The painting is now in the collection of the Victoria and Albert Museum in London, In 2025 it featured in the Turner and Constable: Rivals and Originals exhibition held at Tate Britain.

== See also ==
- List of paintings by J. M. W. Turner

== Bibliography ==
- Concannon, Amy (ed.) Turner and Constable: Rivals and Originals.Tate Publishing, 2025.
- Moyle, Franny. Turner: The Extraordinary Life and Momentous Times of J. M. W. Turner. Penguin Books, 2016.
- Shanes, Eric. The Life and Masterworks of J.M.W. Turner. Parkstone International, 2012.
