= Portrait of Countess Conyngham =

Painting by Thomas Lawrence

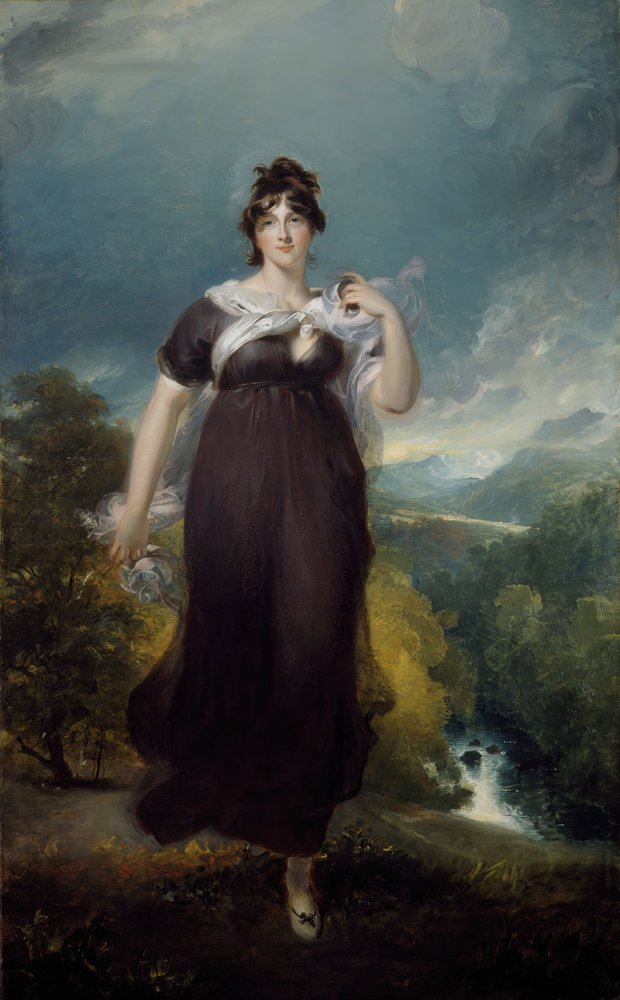
- Artist: Thomas Lawrence
- Year: 1802
- Type: Oil on canvas, portrait painting
- Dimensions: 240 cm × 149 cm (94 in × 59 in)
- Location: Birmingham Museum and Art Gallery, West Midlands

Portrait of Countess Conyngham is an 1802 portrait painting by the British artist Thomas Lawrence. It depicts the Elizabeth, Countess, a member of the Anglo-Irish aristocracy. She is depicted at full length with a vivid Romanticism in a rural landscape.

Lawrence was a self-taught child prodigy son of a Wiltshire innkeeper. By the time he painted Conyngham he was in his early thirties and was a fashionable portraitist of the British elite. He went on to be the dominant painter of the Regency era and as elected President of the Royal Academy in 1820. By that time Conyngham had become the mistress of George IV, a major patron of Lawrence. The painting was displayed at the Royal Academy Exhibition of 1802 held at Somerset House in London. The picture was acquired by the Birmingham Museum and Art Gallery in 1975.

== See also ==
- Portrait of Lady Maria Conyngham, an 1825 portrait of her daughter by Lawrence.

== Bibliography ==
- Ambrose, Tom. The King and the Vice Queen: George IV's Last Scandalous Affair. Sutton Publishing, 2005.
- Ellis, Andrew & Roe, Sonia. Oil Paintings in Public Ownership in Birmingham. Public Catalogue Foundation, 2008.
- Levey, Michael. Sir Thomas Lawrence. National Portrait Gallery, 1979.
- Smith, E.A. George IV. Yale University Press, 1999.
