= Ben Lomond Mountains, Scotland =

Painting by J. M. W. Turner

- Artist: J. M. W. Turner
- Year: c.1802
- Type: Oil on canvas, landscape painting
- Dimensions: 61.1 cm × 98.8 cm (24.1 in × 38.9 in)
- Location: Fitzwilliam Museum; Cambridge

Ben Lomond Mountains, Scotland is an c.1802 landscape painting by the British artist J.M.W. Turner. Produced after Turner's tour of Scotland, it features a view of the mountain of Ben Lomond in the Highlands. It makes reference to the Ossian poems by James Macpherson. The painting was for many years mistaken for another work before being identified by researchers as this work, previously thought to be lost. Before this it was generally known by the title of Welsh Mountain Landscape. The work was displayed at the Royal Academy Exhibition of 1802 at Somerset House in London. It is now in the collection of the Fitzwilliam Museum in Cambridge, having been acquired in 1925.

== See also ==
- List of paintings by J. M. W. Turner

== Bibliography ==
- Bonehill, John, Dulau-Beveridge Anne & Leask, Nigel. Old Ways New Roads: Travels in Scotland 1720–1832. Birlinn Ltd, 2022.
- Porter, James. Beyond Fingal's Cave: Ossian in the Musical Imagination. Boydell & Brewer, 2019.
