= Jacques-François Amand =

French painter

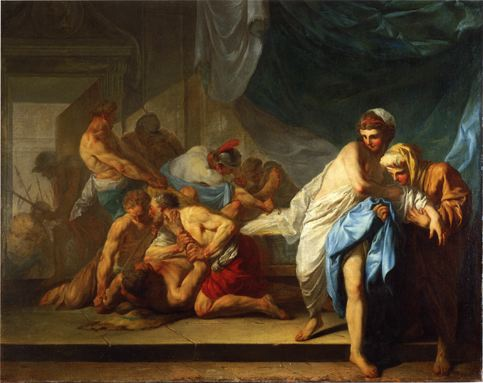
Samson Delivered to the Philistines (1755)

Jacques-François Amand (1730–1769) was a French painter of historical subjects.

Amand was born in 1730, though the exact date is unknown, and the location disputed (Note: Mariette says Paris, but other sources say either 'Gault near Blois' (possibly Saint-Cyr-du-Gault) or Goult, Vaucluse.). He studied under Jean-Baptiste Marie Pierre. In 1756 he was awarded the Prix de Rome for his Samson and Delilah; he spent 1759–1763 in Rome. After returning to Paris, he exhibited at the Salon numerous subjects from ancient history and mythology. He also engraved several of his own compositions. He was admitted to the Académie royale de peinture et de sculpture on 26 September 1767 with a painting of Mago Barca. He died in Paris, on 7 March 1769.
