= The Angry Father =

Painting by John Opie

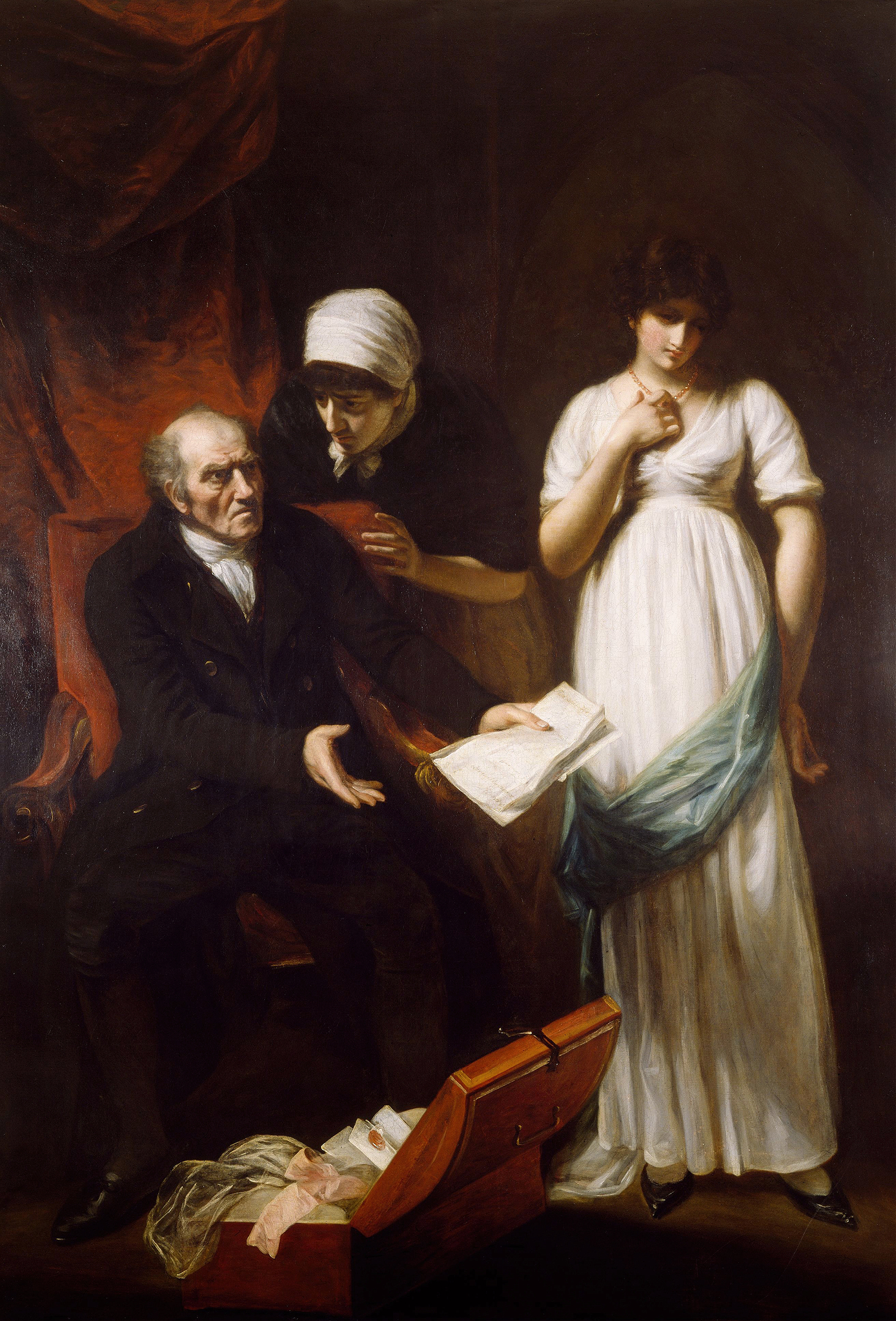
- Artist: John Opie
- Year: 1802
- Type: Oil on canvas, genre painting
- Dimensions: 240.4 cm × 167.2 cm (94.6 in × 65.8 in)
- Location: Aston Hall, Birmingham

The Angry Father is an 1802 oil painting by the British artist John Opie. A genre work, it depicts a young woman whose secret romantic letters have been intercepted, to the fury of her father. The protagonists wear the dress of the very early Regency era. Produced later in his career it ties in with the emerging Romanticism of the new century and has been described as a "novelette" in itself.

Also known as The Discovery of the Clandestine Correspondence, the painting was displayed at the Royal Academy Exhibition of 1802 held at Somerset House in London. It is now in the collection of Aston Hall, having been acquired by the city in 1867. in 1817 the printmaker James Ward produced a popular mezzotint based on the painting.

== Bibliography ==
- Earland, Ada. John Opie and His Circle. Hutchinson & Company, 1911.
- Waterhouse, Ellis. Painting in Britain, 1530 to 1790. Yale University Press, 1994.
