= Fishermen Upon a Lee-Shore in Squally Weather =

Painting by J. M. W. Turner

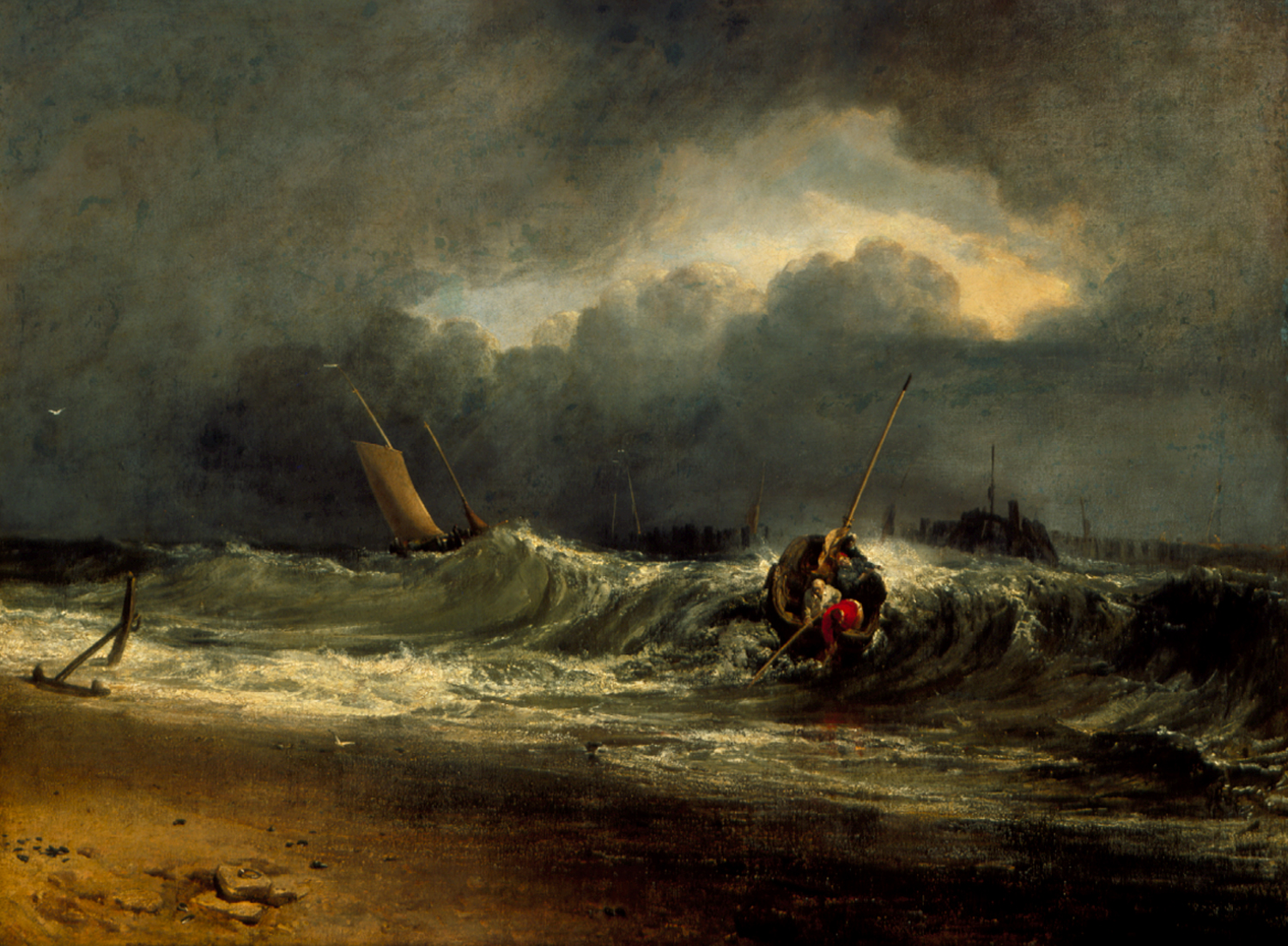
- Artist: J.M.W. Turner
- Year: 1802
- Type: Oil on canvas, landscape painting
- Dimensions: 91.5 cm × 122 cm (36.0 in × 48 in)
- Location: Southampton City Art Gallery; Southampton

Fishermen Upon a Lee-Shore in Squally Weather is an 1802 oil painting by the British artist J.M.W. Turner. It depicts a fishing craft being driven onto a lee shore by the wind, presented in the dramatic style of the developing romantic movement. Turner admired the heroism of the fisherman who went to sea in dangerous conditions. Stylistically it shows the influence of Loutherbourg and Joseph Wright of Derby.

It was one of two seascapes that Turner submitted to the Royal Academy Exhibition of 1802 at Somerset House in London, his first as a full member of the Royal Academy of Arts. Today the painting is in the collection of the Southampton City Art Gallery in Hampshire, having been acquired in 1951.

== See also ==
- List of paintings by J. M. W. Turner

== Bibliography ==
- Bailey, Anthony. J.M.W. Turner: Standing in the Sun. Tate Enterprises Ltd, 2013.
- Hamilton, James. Turner's Britain. Merrell, 2003
- Reynolds, Graham. Turner. Thames & Hudson, 2022.
- Spencer-Longhurst, Paul. The Sun Rising Through Vapour: Turner's Early Seascapes. Third Millennium Information, 2003.
