= Alexander Bannerman (engraver) =

English engraver

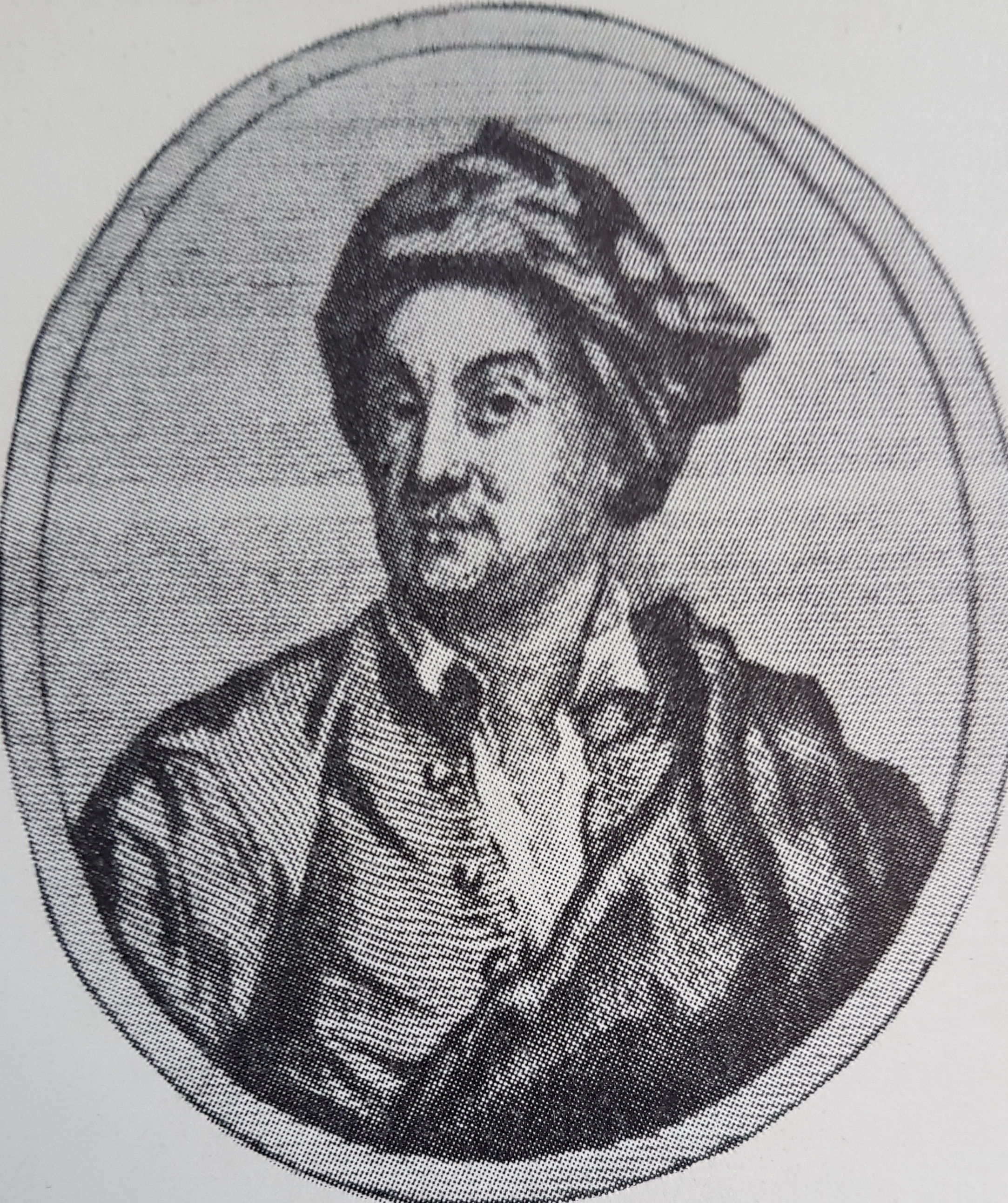
Alexander Bannerman

Alexander Bannerman (fl. 1737–76), was a Scottish engraver.

Alexander Bannerman was possibly the Alexander Bennerman, son of George Bennerman and Ann Watt, baptised in the Canongate of Edinburgh on 11 July 1737. He may therefore have been a late pupil of Richard Cooper senior (1701–1765) or of Cooper's pupil, Andrew Bell (1726–1809). He advertised A Set of Edinburgh Habits in six copper plates in the Caledonian Mercury on 11 May 1756 and a further advertisement in the same on 17 June 1776 where he announced that his stay in Edinburgh would be very short before he returned to London, 'Having a desire to visit his native place, and to add as much as in his power to the advancement of the polite arts in Scotland, he purchased last year of Mr. Strange [Robert Strange, engraver] (before he went abroad) his entire collection of prints by foreign masters, which he was upwards of 20 years in collecting'.

He engraved some plates for Alderman Boydell, ‘Joseph interpreting Pharaoh's Dream,’ after Ribera; the ‘Death of St. Joseph,’ after Velasquez; and ‘Dancing Children,’ after Le Maire. For Walpole's Anecdotes of Painters (London 1765) he also engraved several portraits. In 1766 he was a member of the Incorporated Society of Artists; in 1770 he is known to have been living in Cambridge. In Nagler's dictionary (ed. 1878) is a long list of his works; there are good specimens in the print room of the British Museum.
