= Antonio Capellani =

Italian engraver

Antonio Capellani (born c. 1730) was an Italian engraver. He was born at Venice, where he was a pupil of Joseph Wagner, and engraved several plates both at Rome and Venice. He engraved most of the portraits in the edition of Vasari, published by Bottarini at Rome in 1760. He also engraved several of the plates for the Schola Italia Picturae under the direction of Gavin Hamilton.

Among his prints are:

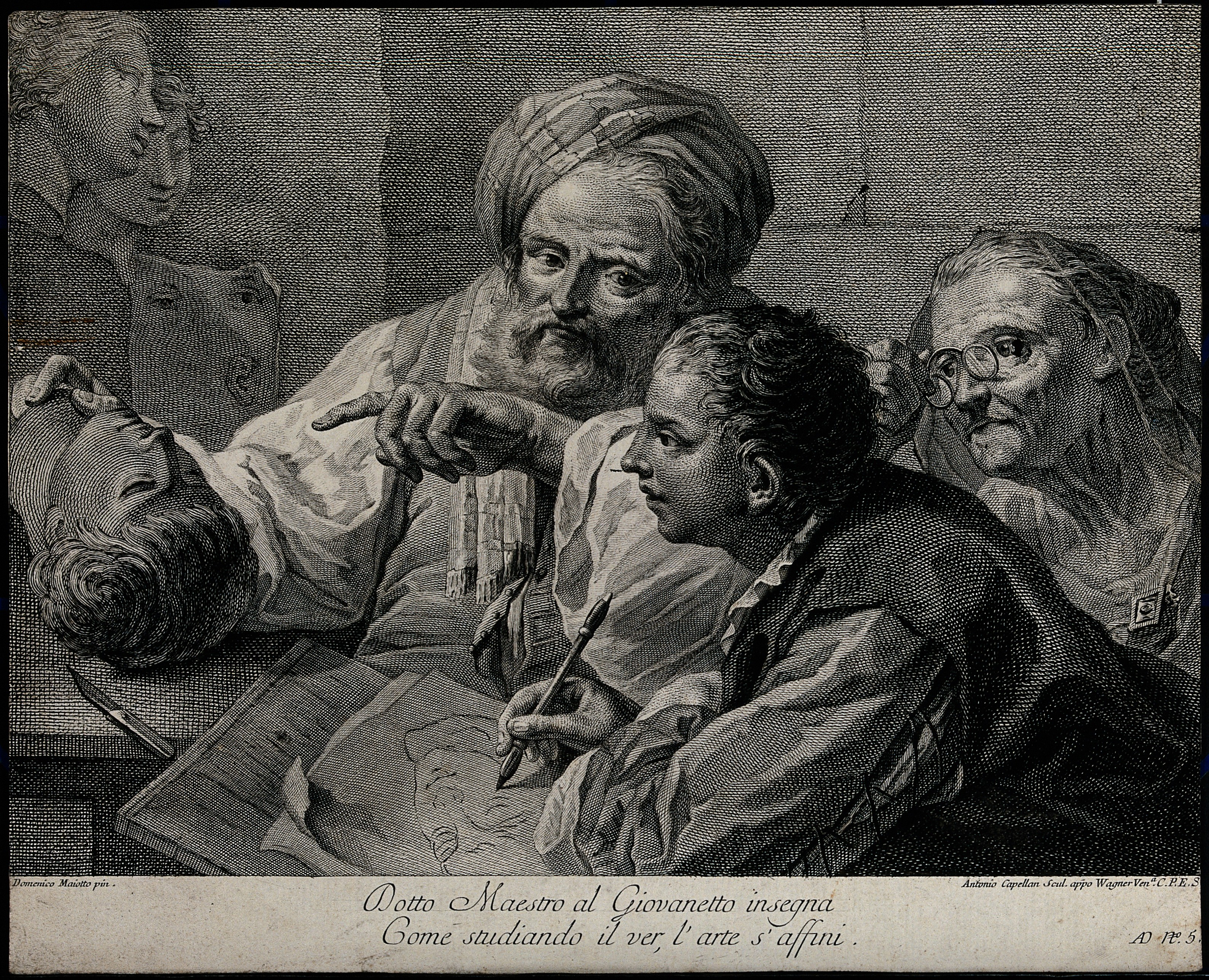
The drawing school

- Portrait of Michelangelo Buonarroti.
- The Drawing School; after Domenico Maggiotto.
- Diana and Endymion; after the same.
- Apollo and Daphne; after the same.
- Adam and Eve driven from Paradise; after the same.
- The Creation of Eve; after Michelangelo.
- Marriage of St. Catharine; after Correggio.
- View of the Portico of the Villa Albani; after Panini.
- The Repose in Egypt (1772); after Federico Barocci.

== Sources ==
- Bryan, Michael (1886). Robert Edmund Graves (ed.). Dictionary of Painters and Engravers, Biographical and Critical. Vol. I: A-K. London: George Bell and Sons. p. 228.
