= Ships Bearing Up for Anchorage =

Painting by J. M. W. Turner

Ships Bearing up for Anchorage
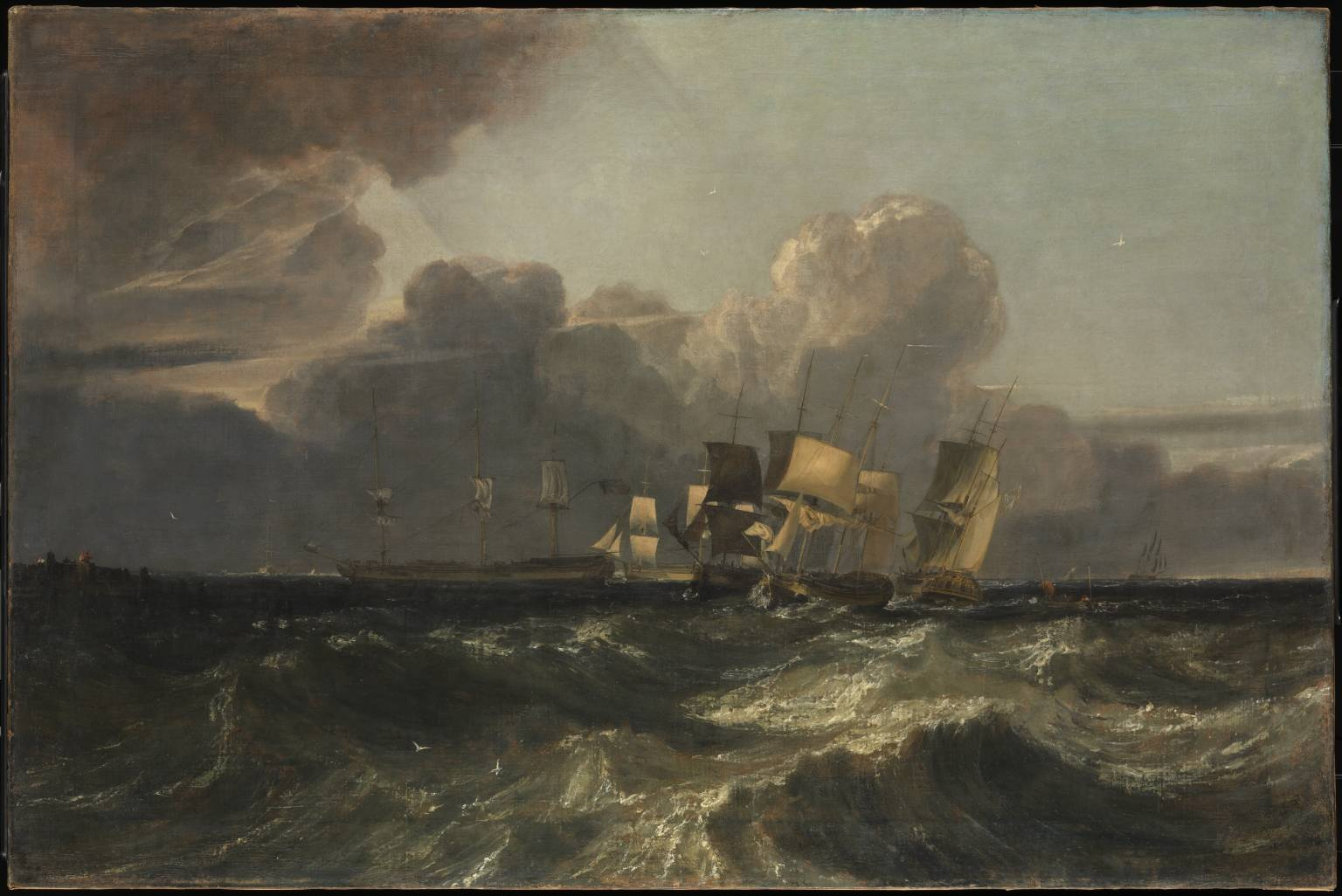
- Artist: J. M. W. Turner
- Year: 1802
- Type: Oil on canvas, marine painting
- Dimensions: 119.5 cm × 180.5 cm (47.0 in × 71.1 in)
- Location: Petworth House; Sussex

Ships Bearing up for Anchorage is an 1802 marine painting by the British artist J. M. W. Turner. Along with the previous year's Dutch Boats in a Gale it marked Turner's move into using a style reminiscent of Nicolas Poussin for his seascapes. It was bought by the art collector, George Wyndham, 3rd Earl of Egremont and it also known as The Egremont Seapiece.

It was one of the four paintings, two of them seascapes, that Turner displayed at the Royal Academy's Summer Exhibition of 1802 - the first since he had been elected to full membership of the Academy. It was also the first painting he exhibited when he signed himself as J.M.W. Turner rather than William. It was acquired by the government via acceptance in lieu in 1984 and was assigned to the Tate Gallery which holds much of the Turner Bequest. It is on permanent loan at the National Trust property Petworth House in West Sussex, the historic home of Lord Egremont.

== See also ==
- List of paintings by J. M. W. Turner

== Bibliography ==
- Bailey, Anthony. J.M.W. Turner: Standing in the Sun. Tate Enterprises Ltd, 2013.
- Eitner, Lorenz. 19th Century European Painting: David To Cezanne. Avalon Publishing, 2002.
- Rowell, Christopher, Warrell, Ian & Brown, David Blayney. urner at Petworth. Harry N. Abrams, 2002.
- Spencer-Longhurst, Paul. The Sun Rising Through Vapour: Turner's Early Seascapes. Third Millennium Information, 2003.
