= Marc van Duvenede =

Flemish painter

Marc van Duvenede (c. 1674–1730) was a Flemish painter, born at Bruges. He went to Rome when he was very young, and became a scholar of Carlo Maratti, in whose academy he studied four years. There are several of his pictures in the churches and convents of his native city, of which the most esteemed is the 'Martyrdom of St. Laurence' in the chapel of St. Christopher. He died at Bruges in 1730.

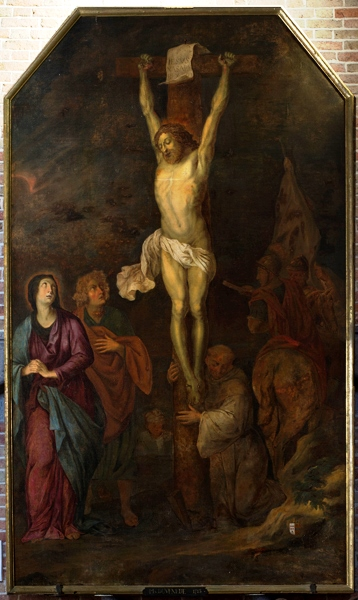
Onze-Lieve-Vrouw-Bezoekingskerk (Lissewege)

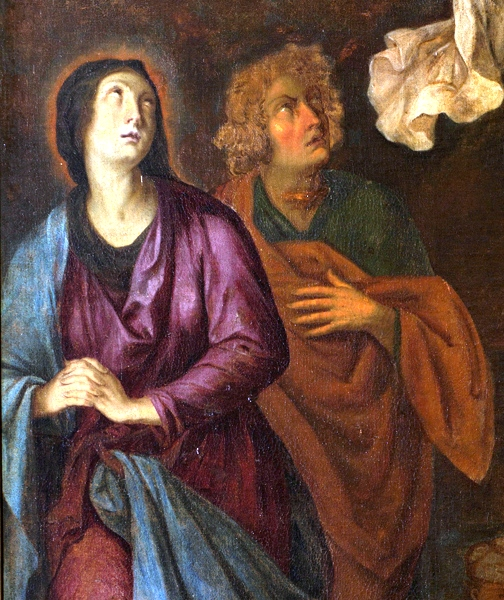
Christ on the Cross, Lissewege (detail)

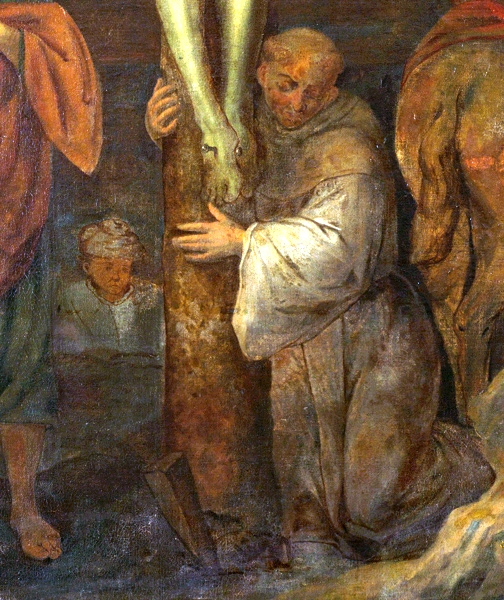
Christ on the Cross, Lissewege (detail)
