= Bartolommeo Torregiani =

Italian painter

Bartolommeo Torregiani (died c. 1674) was an Italian painter of the Baroque. He was a follower of Salvatore Rosa, and painted landscapes and portraits. He is said to have died in 1674.
