= 1791 in art =

Events from the year 1791 in art.

== Events ==
- The Society of Artists of Great Britain is dissolved.

== Works ==
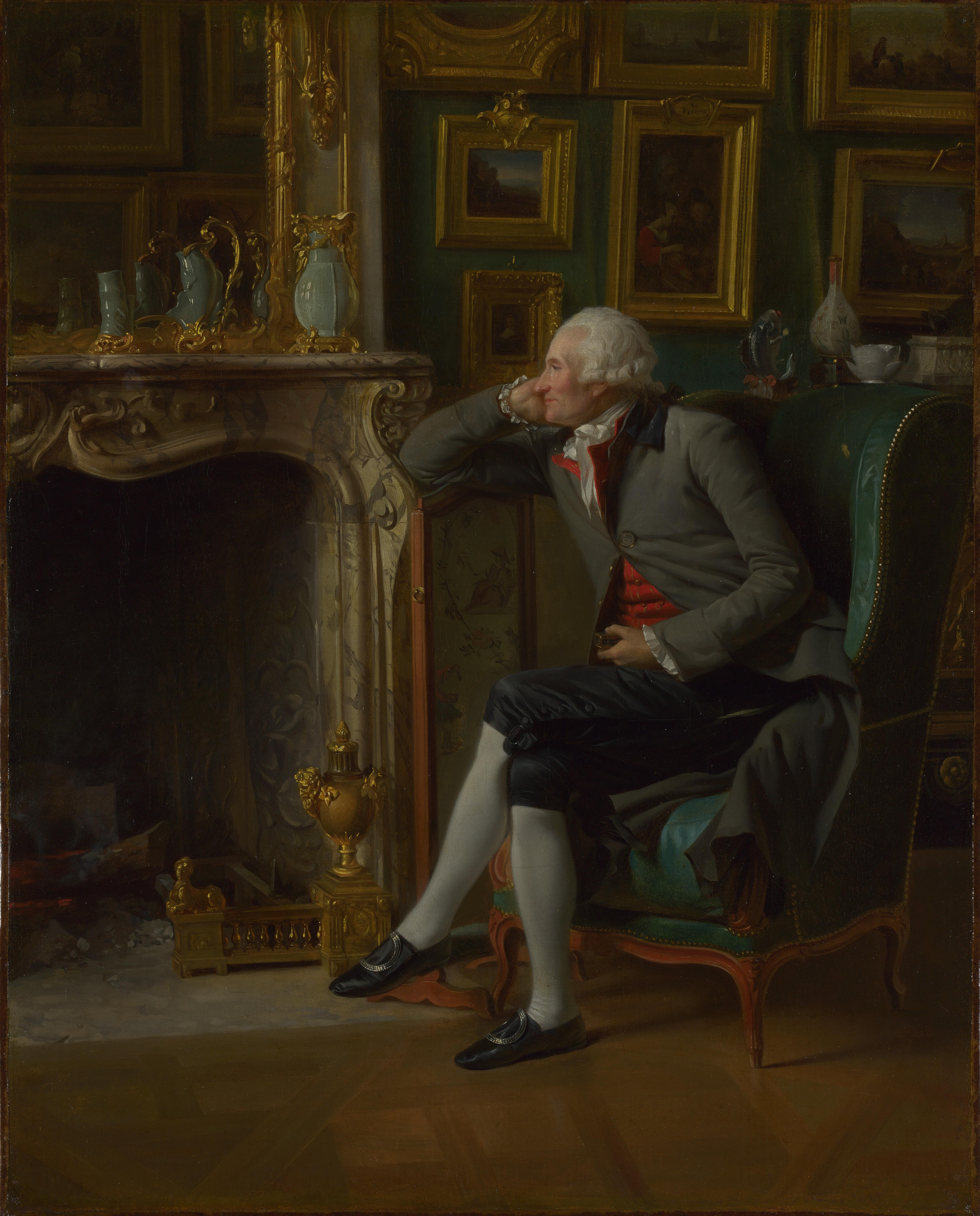
H.-P. Danloux – Le Baron de Besenval dans son salon de compagnie at the Hôtel de Besenval in Paris

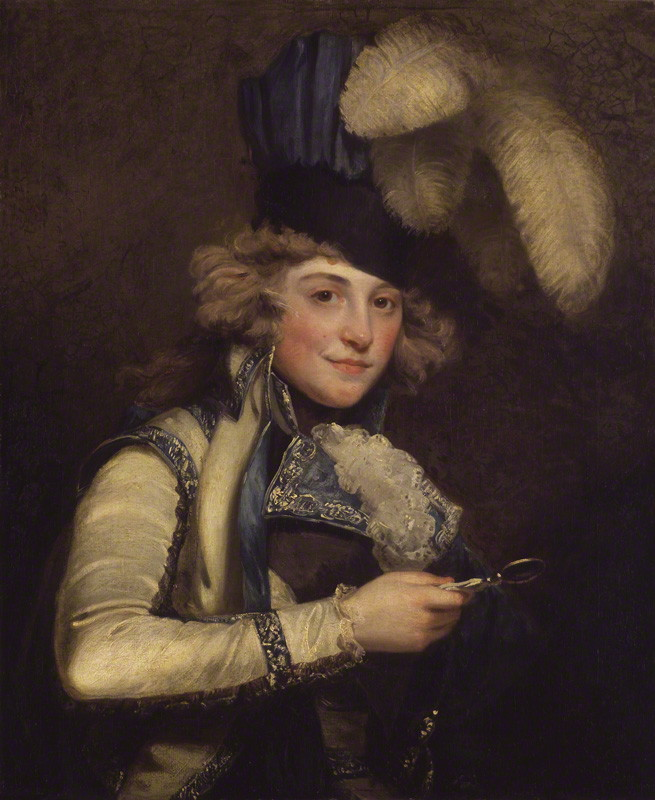
Dorothea Jordan as Hippolyta by John Hoppner

- James Barry – The Thames (or Triumph of Navigation)
- William Beechey – Portrait of John Carr
- Henri-Pierre Danloux – Baron de Besenval in his Study (National Gallery, London)
- Anne-Louis Girodet de Roussy-Trioson – Endymion: Moonlight (The Sleep of Endymion)
- Anton Graff – Friedrich Schiller
- John Hoppner – Dorothea Jordan as Hippolyta
- Élisabeth Vigée Le Brun – Portrait of Hyacinthe Gabrielle Roland
- George Morland – The Slave Trade
- Jean-Laurent Mosnier – Portrait of the Chevalier d'Eon
- Henry Raeburn – Portrait of Sir John and Lady Clerk of Penicuik
- Jacques Sablet – Roman Elegy
- George Stubbs – Equestrian portrait of The Prince of Wales
- François-André Vincent – Democritus Among the Abderites
- Joseph Wright of Derby – Three Children of Richard Arkwright with a Goat

== Births ==
- January 6 – William Bent Berczy, painter and political figure in Upper Canada (died 1873)
- February 10
  - Francesco Hayez, Italian historical, portrait and political painter (died 1881)
  - Ōtagaki Rengetsu, Japanese Buddhist nun and poet, skilled potter and painter, and expert calligrapher (died 1875)
- February 13 – Sylvester Shchedrin, Russian landscape painter (died 1830)
- February 21 – Hezekiah Augur, American sculptor and inventor (died 1858)
- March 20 – Marie Ellenrieder, German painter (died 1863)
- April 27 – Samuel F. B. Morse, American inventor and painter of portraits and historic scenes (died 1872)
- June 18 – William Cowen, English landscape painter (died 1864)
- August 2 – August Piepenhagen, German painter active in Bohemia (died 1868)
- September 26 – Théodore Géricault, French painter and lithographer, pioneer of the Romantic movement (died 1824)
- December 17 – Samuel Amsler, Swiss engraver (died 1849)
- date unknown
  - Kapiton Pavlov, Russian portrait painter (died 1852)
  - Pyotr Sokolov, Russian aquarelle portraitist (died 1848)
  - Antoine Jean-Baptiste Thomas, French painter and lithographer (died 1833)

== Deaths ==
- January 4 – Étienne Maurice Falconet, French Rococo sculptor (born 1716)
- January 23 – François-Thomas Germain, French silversmith (born 1726)
- January 25 – Giovanni Pichler, German-Italian artist in engraved gems (born 1734)
- February 12 – William Parry, Welsh portrait painter (born 1743)
- March 20 – Marie Jeanne Clemens, Danish engraver and painter, member of Danish Academy of Fine Arts (born 1755)
- June 5 – Giuseppe Ghedini, Italian painter and university professor of painting (born 1708)
- June 22 – Giuseppe Antonio Landi, Italian neoclassical architect and painter of quadratura (born 1713)
- June 30 – Jean-Baptiste Descamps, French painter of village scenes (born 1714)
- October 17 – Per Floding, Swedish designer and engraver (born 1731)
- November 7 – Dorning Rasbotham, English writer and painter (born 1730)
- November 16 – Edward Penny, English portrait and historical painter (born 1714)
- November 25 – Jean-Claude Richard, French painter and engraver (born 1727)
- date unknown
  - Robert Carver, Irish painter, especially of theater scenery (born 1730)
  - Kang Sehwang, Korean politician, painter, calligrapher and art critic (born 1713)
