= 1791 in Russia =

Events from the year 1791 in Russia

== Incumbents ==
- Monarch – Catherine II

== Events ==
- Russo-Turkish War (1787–1792) continues
  - July 10: Battle of Măcin
  - August 11: Battle of Cape Kaliakra
- Kakhovka founded
- Pale of Settlement established
- Zoological Museum of Moscow University founded

== Births ==
- Vladimir Fyodorovich Adlerberg, general
- Sergey Aksakov, writer
- Nikolay Bestuzhev, navy officer, writer, inventor, painter, Decembrist
- Kapiton Pavlov, portrait painter
- Yekaterina Saltykov, courtier
- Pyotr Sokolov (portraitist), portrait painter
- Alexandru Sturdza, diplomat and writer

== Deaths ==
- Prince Alexander of Kartli (1726–1791), Georgian prince
- Yakov Knyazhnin, writer
- Grigory Potemkin (born 1739)
- Potap Kuzmich Zaikov, navigator in Russian America
