= François Dilasser =

French painter

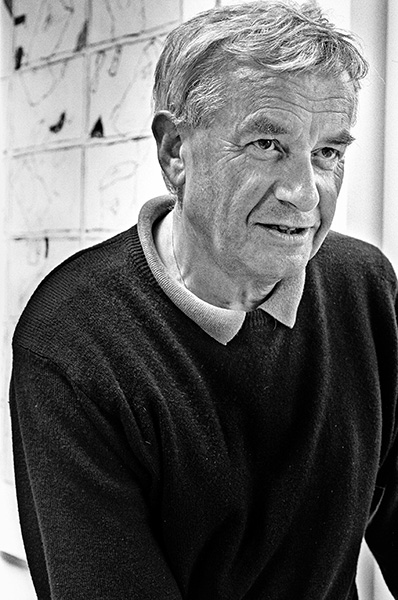
- Born: March 5, 1926; Lesneven
- Died: September 16, 2012 (aged 86); Guilers
- Occupation: Painter
- Years active: 1975-2012

François Dilasser (5 March 1926 – 16 September 2012) was a French painter.

== Biography ==
François Dilasser was born on 5 March 1926 in Lesneven, France. He was involved in painting since childhood. From 1970, he regularly exhibited in galleries, museums and art centers. He participated in the Salon d'Automne in Paris from 1972 to 1976, in the Salon des Réalités Nouvelles from 1973 to 1984, and in numerous collective exhibitions in Brittany. Dilasser died on 16 September 2012 in his hometown of Lesneven.

== Solo exhibitions (Selection) ==
- 2022: Le bruit de nos vies, Eymoutiers, Nouvelle-Aquitaine, Fr
- 2018: Les Paysages de François Dilasser, Galerie de Rohan, Landerneau, Fr
- 2016 Dilasser, le dessin, Musée des Beaux-Arts de Brest, Brittany, Fr
- 2016: Dilasser chez lui, Musée du Léon, Lesneven, Fr
- 2015: Des histoires sans fin, MAMCO, Geneva, Switzerland
- 2013: François Dilasser. L'atelier – Œuvres choisies 1972-2007, Domaine de Kerguéhennec, Bignan, Fr
- 2009: Les rois ont perdu leur couronne pour un chapeau, Musée des Beaux-Arts de Bordeaux, Bordeaux, Fr
- 2008: Les rois ont perdu leur couronne pour un chapeau, Musée des Beaux-Arts de Brest, Brittany, Fr
- 2003: Planètes, Étoiles, Galerie Frédéric Giroux, Paris, Fr
- 2002: Claire Brétécher rencontre François Dilasser, portraits/autoportraits, Faculty of Letters and Human Sciences - Victor Segalen, Brest, Fr
- 2001: Abbey of Sainte-Trinité, Caen, Caen, Fr

== Gallery ==
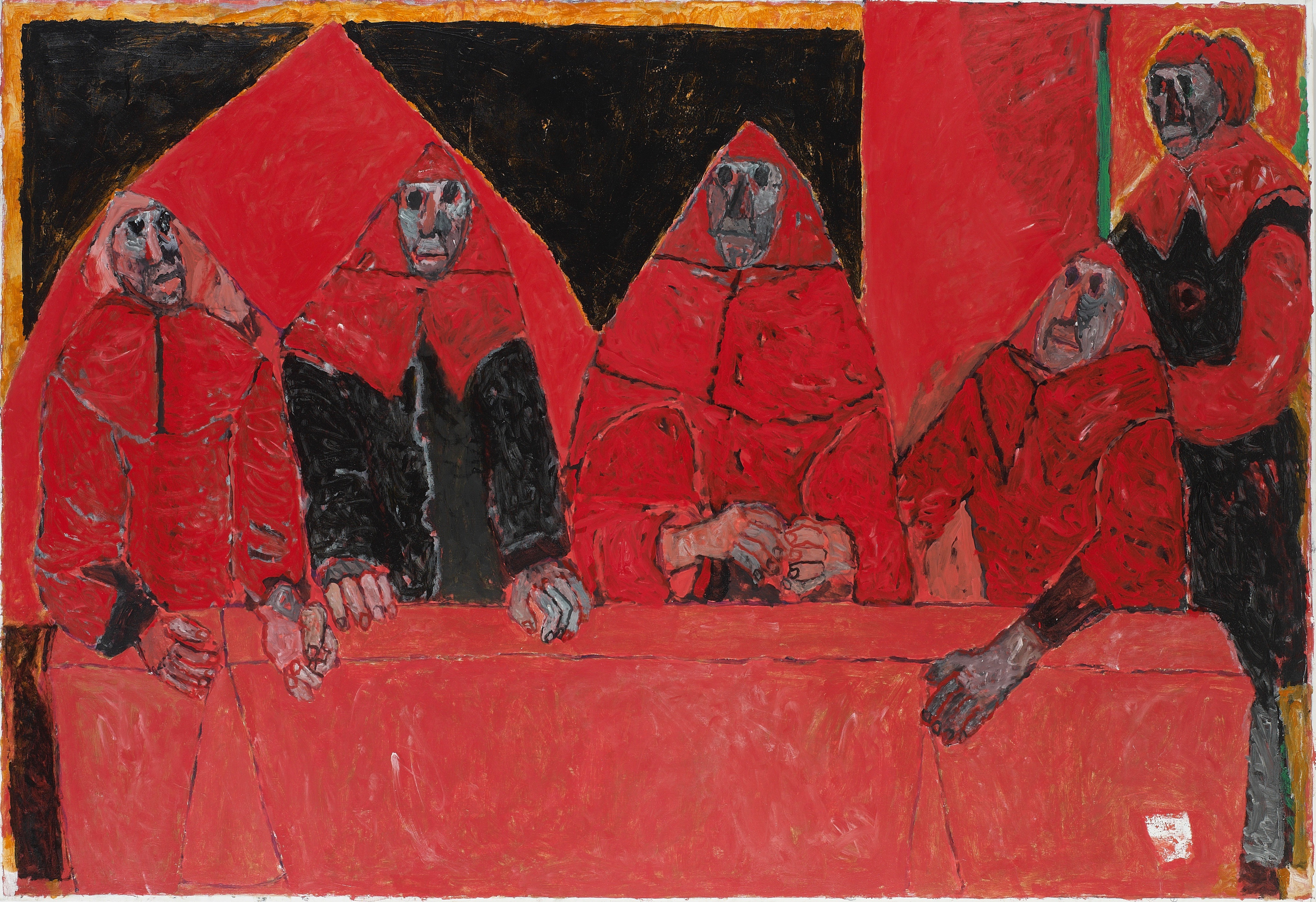
François Dilasser, Untitled, 1995, series Les Régentes.

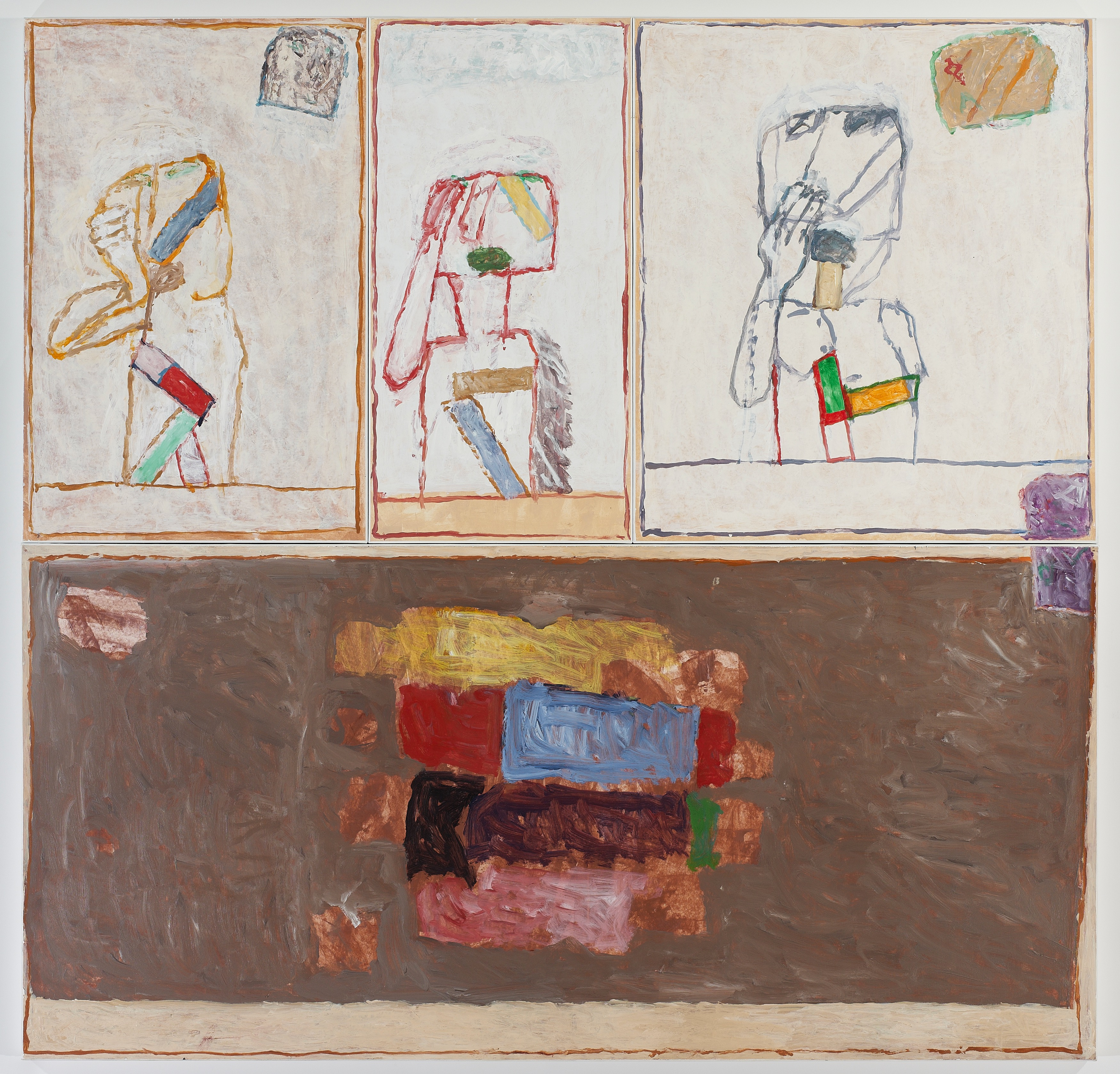
François Dilasser, 1994

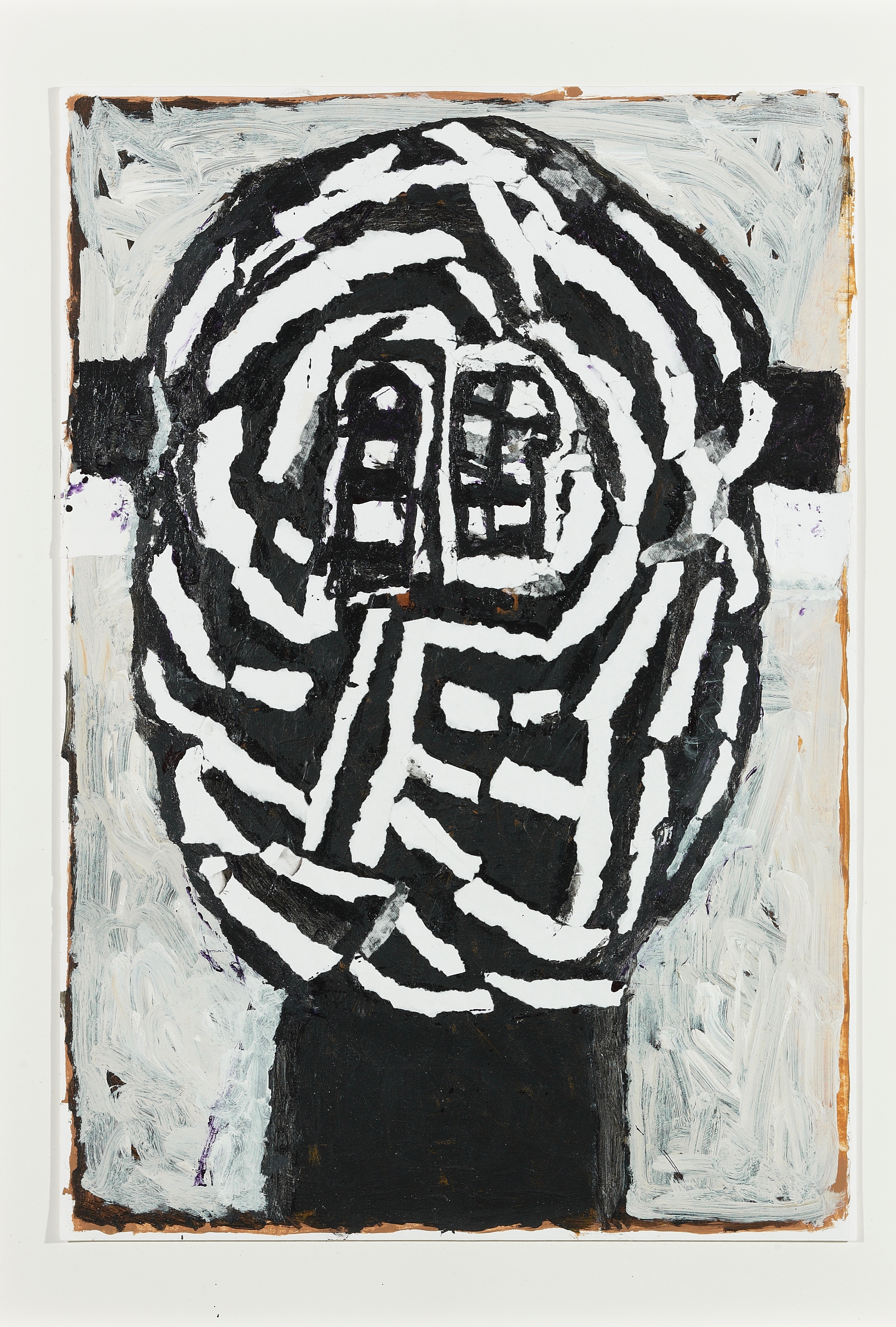
François Dilasser, Untitled, 2000
