= Roman Elegy =

Painting by Jacques Sablet

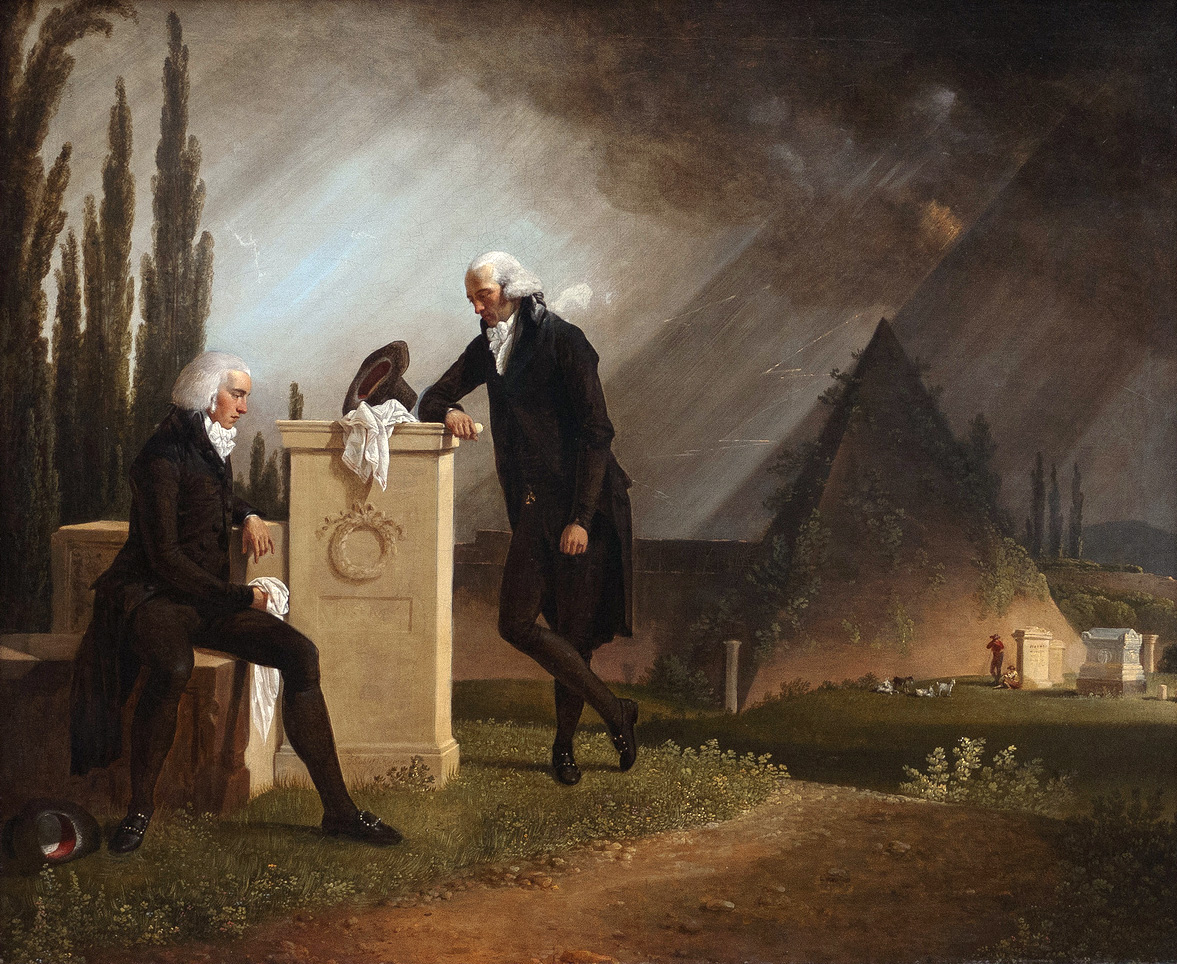
- Artist: Jacques Sablet
- Year: 1791
- Type: Oil on canvas, portrait painting
- Dimensions: 61.7 cm × 74 cm (24.3 in × 29 in)
- Location: Musée des Beaux-Arts; Brest

Roman Elegy (French: Élégie romaine) is a 1791 oil painting by the Swiss artist Jacques Sablet. It depicts two men in the Protestant Cemetery in Rome mourning over a friend's tomb. In the background is the Pyramid of Cestius while shepherds are shown tending their flock of sheep. A conversation piece, it is distinctly Neoclassical in style although its mournful atmosphere reflects the emerging Romantic movement. The picture may feature a self-portrait of the artist along with his brother Jean-François Sablet. The title is a reference to Johann Wolfgang von Goethe's series of poems Roman Elegies. The painting is now in the Musée des Beaux-Arts de Brest in Brittany.

== Bibliography ==
- Bowron, Edgar Peters & Rishel, Joseph J. Art in Rome in the Eighteenth Century. Merrell, 2000.
- Luzzi, Joseph. Romantic Europe and the Ghost of Italy. Yale University Press, 2008.
- Tarabra, Daniela. European Art of the Eighteenth Century. Getty Publications, 2008
