= Musée des Beaux-Arts de Brest =

French art museum

Brest’s Museum of Fine Arts
- Musée des Beaux-Arts de Brest
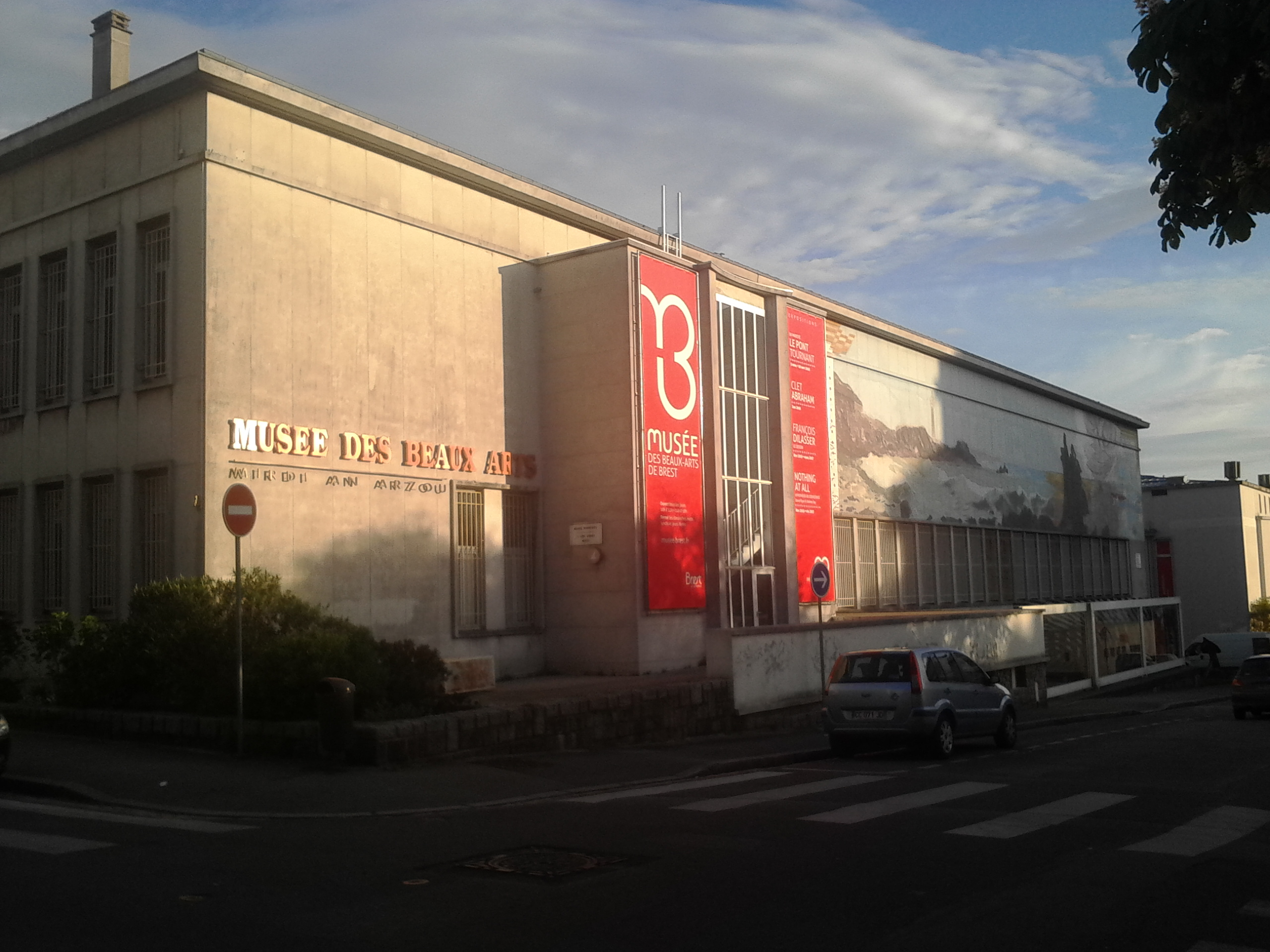
- Location: Brest, France
- Coordinates: 48°23′06″N 4°29′25″W
- Website: musee.brest.fr/brests-museum-of-fine-arts-3235.html

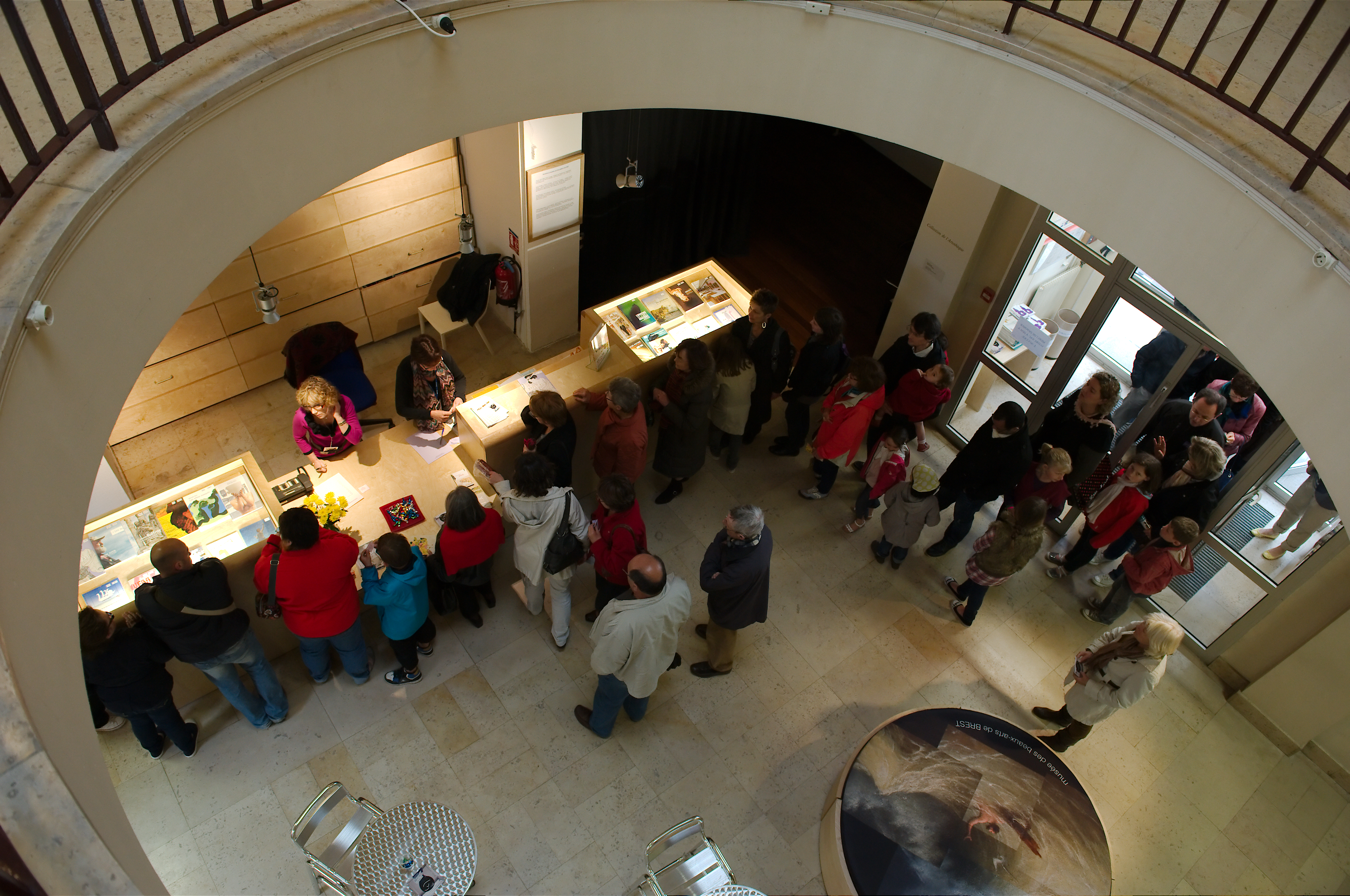

The Musée des Beaux-Arts de Brest is the main art museum in the city of Brest, Brittany, France, housing French and Italian old masters as well as more modern art. It and most of the city were destroyed by Allied bombing during the Second World War and the building and its collections both had to be recreated in the post-war period, making it what one author has called "the largest collection [of old masters] to have been formed in France since 1945". The museum building was completed in 1968 and is typical of Brest's functional post-war architecture.

== History ==
=== Destruction ===
On 20 September 1938 the director general of fine arts at the ministry of national education in Paris invited curator Jean Lachaud to produce a list of artworks to be protected in case of war. From September 1939 the Danguillecourt and Rodellec du Portzic collections and some other precious works, altogether totalling 95 works, were evacuated by the city council to the château de Penmarch near Lesneven, a building owned by the city of Brest. As the war got closer, the decision was taken to move the 27 crates at Penmarch by train to the château du Plessis-Macé near Angers, then to the château de la Lorie.

There were also plans to evacuate the rest of the works in the collection. The artworks were unframed, rolled and crated but a lack of manpower and transport prevented their being moved and some of them were damaged in a three hour bombing raid on 31 March 1941 against three German heavy cruisers then in harbour at Brest. Full evacuation of the museum was planned for 9 July the same year but on the night of 4–5 July another British raid against the cruisers completely destroyed the museum. The rubble was pillaged, leading to the "Dépêche de Brest" on 12 July demanding that the city's inhabitants return objects stolen from the museum's ruins. Only a few objects such as counters, iron weapons and bronze cannon were recovered as the rubble was cleared. The city library moved to the ground floor of the école professionnelle des filles on rue Danton before moving into two classrooms at the école maternelle Bugeaud.

Destruction of the 'halle aux blés'

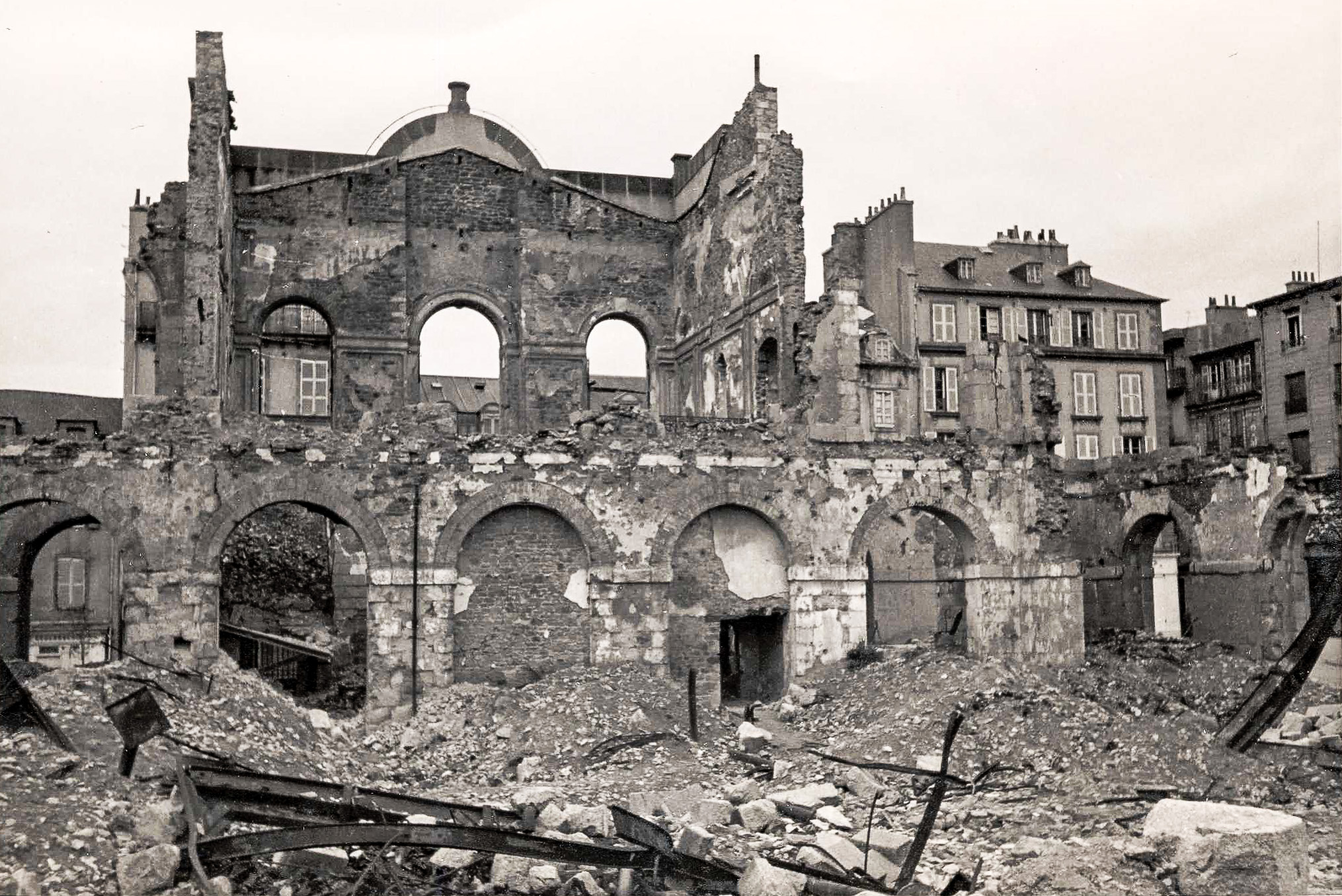

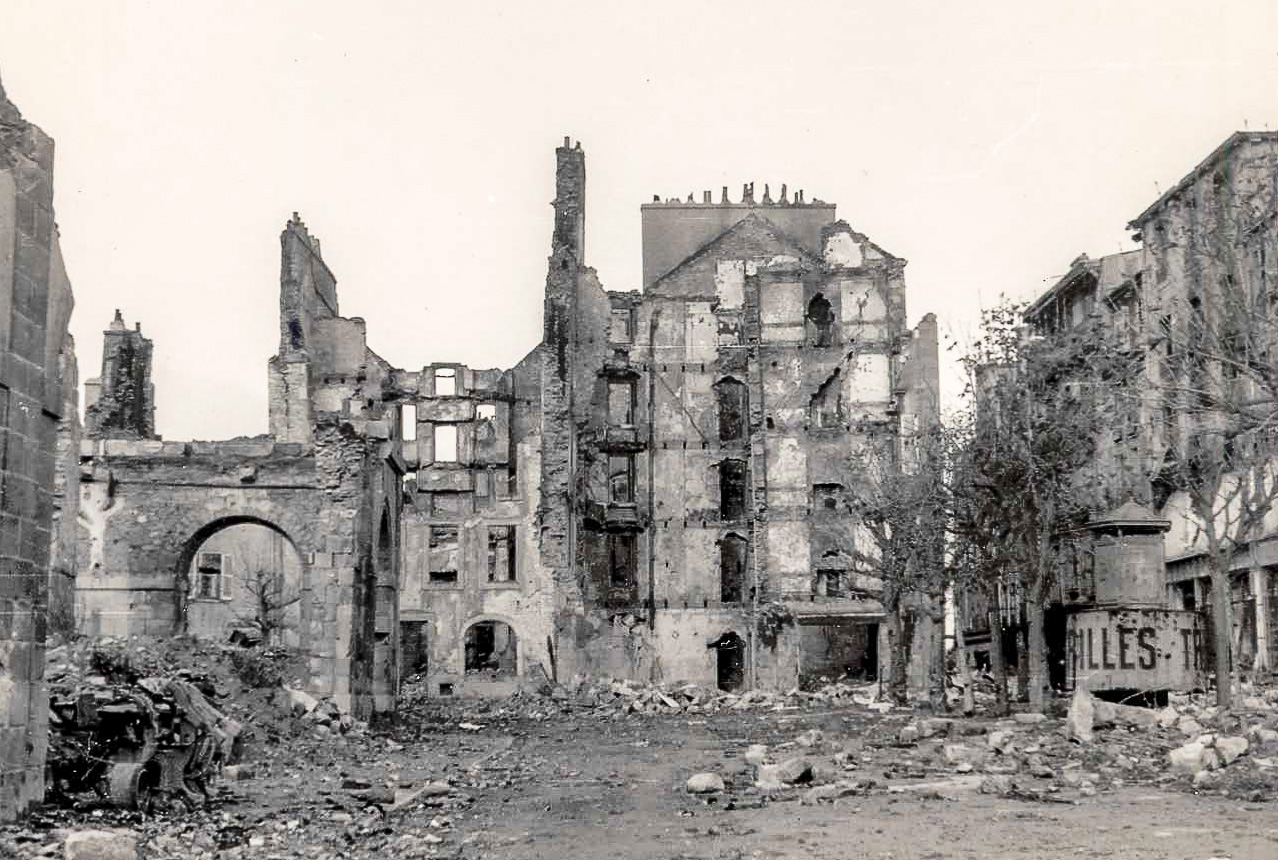

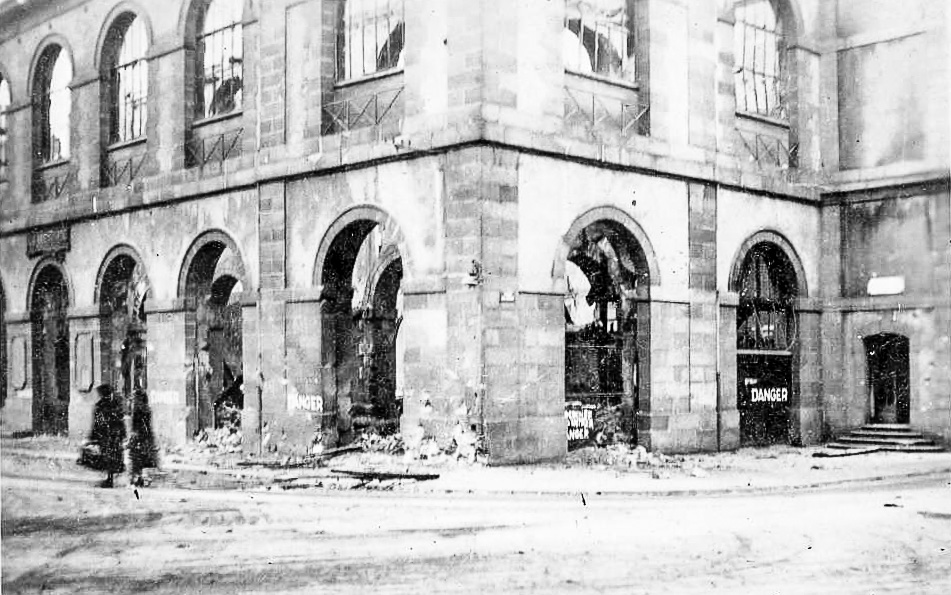

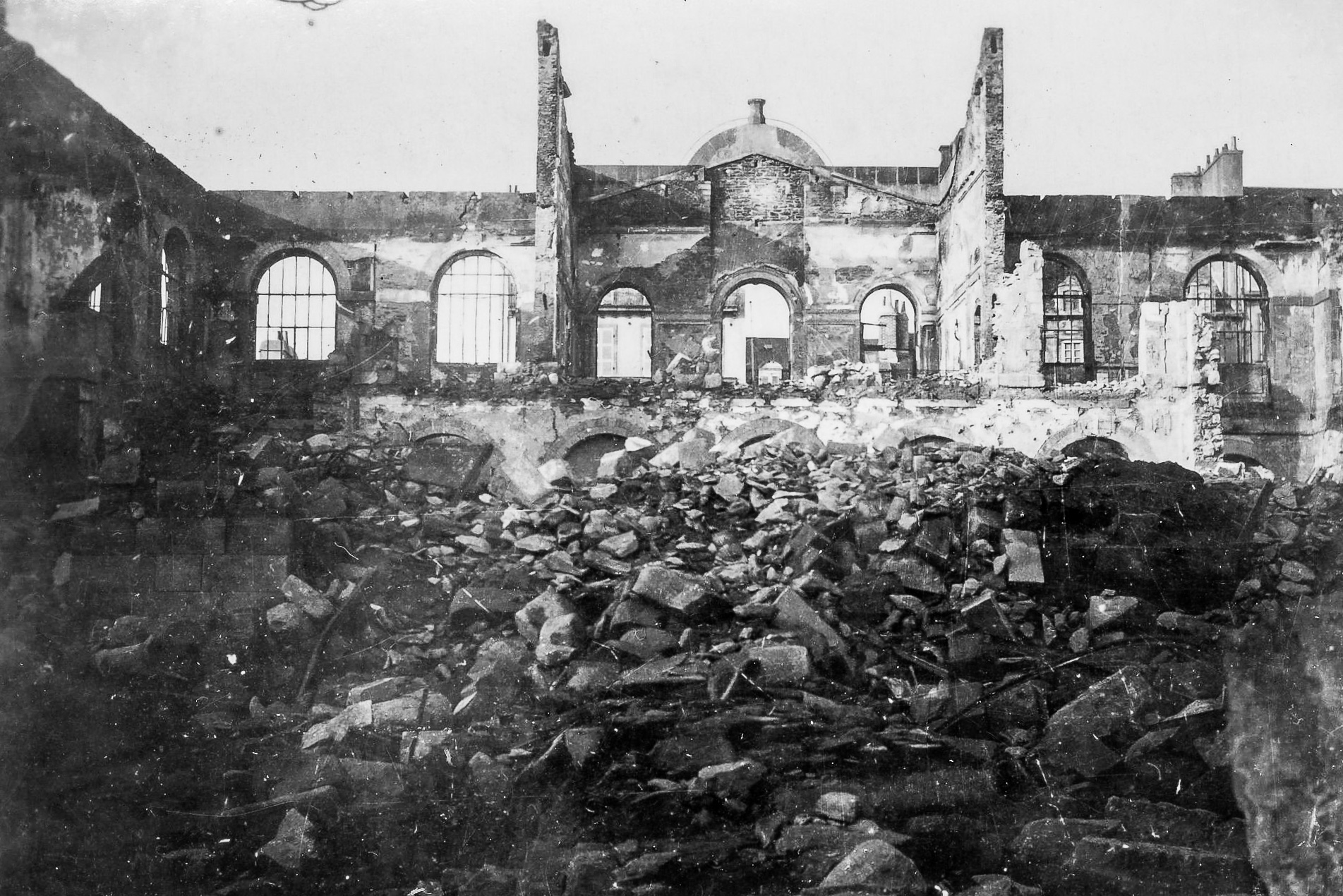

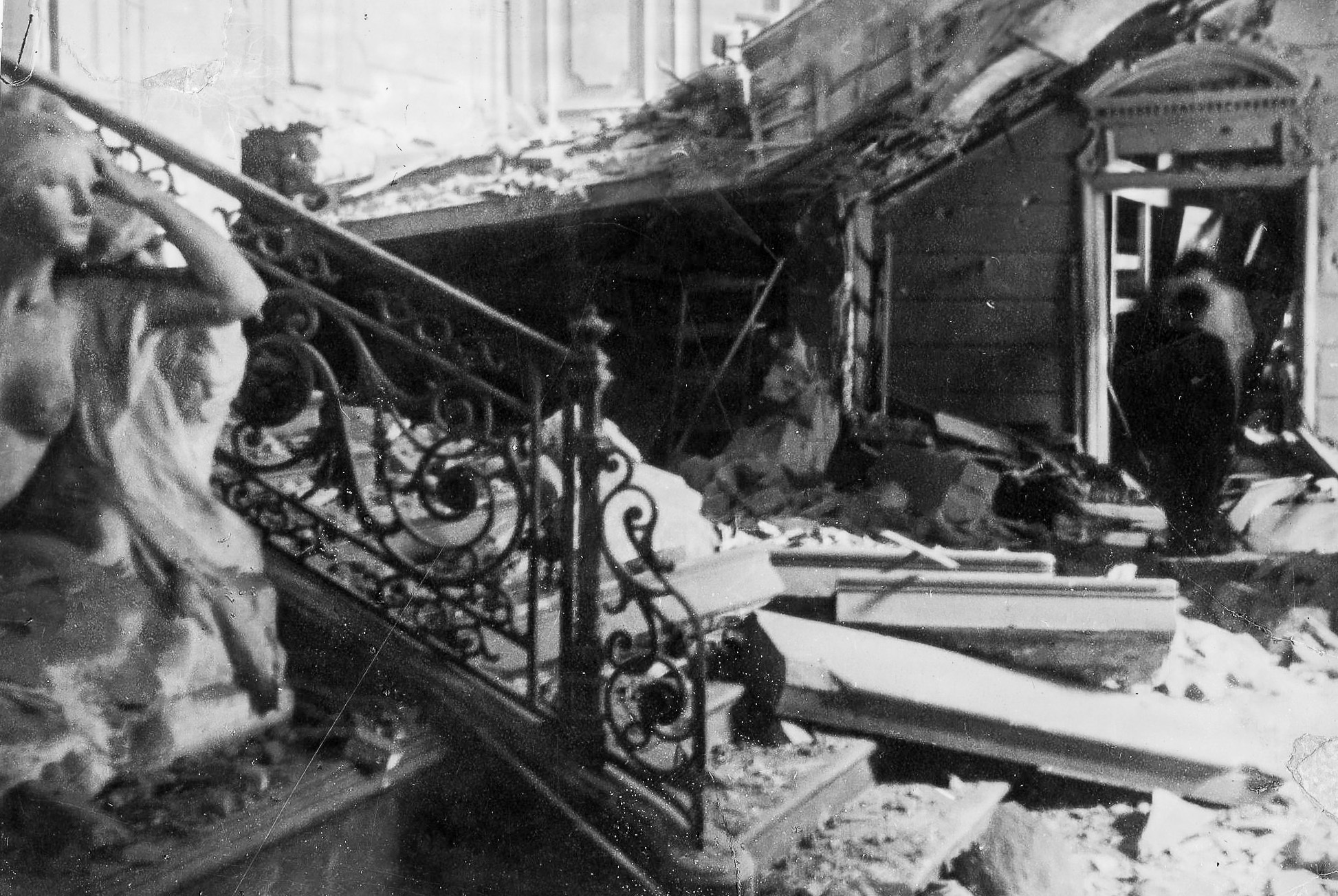

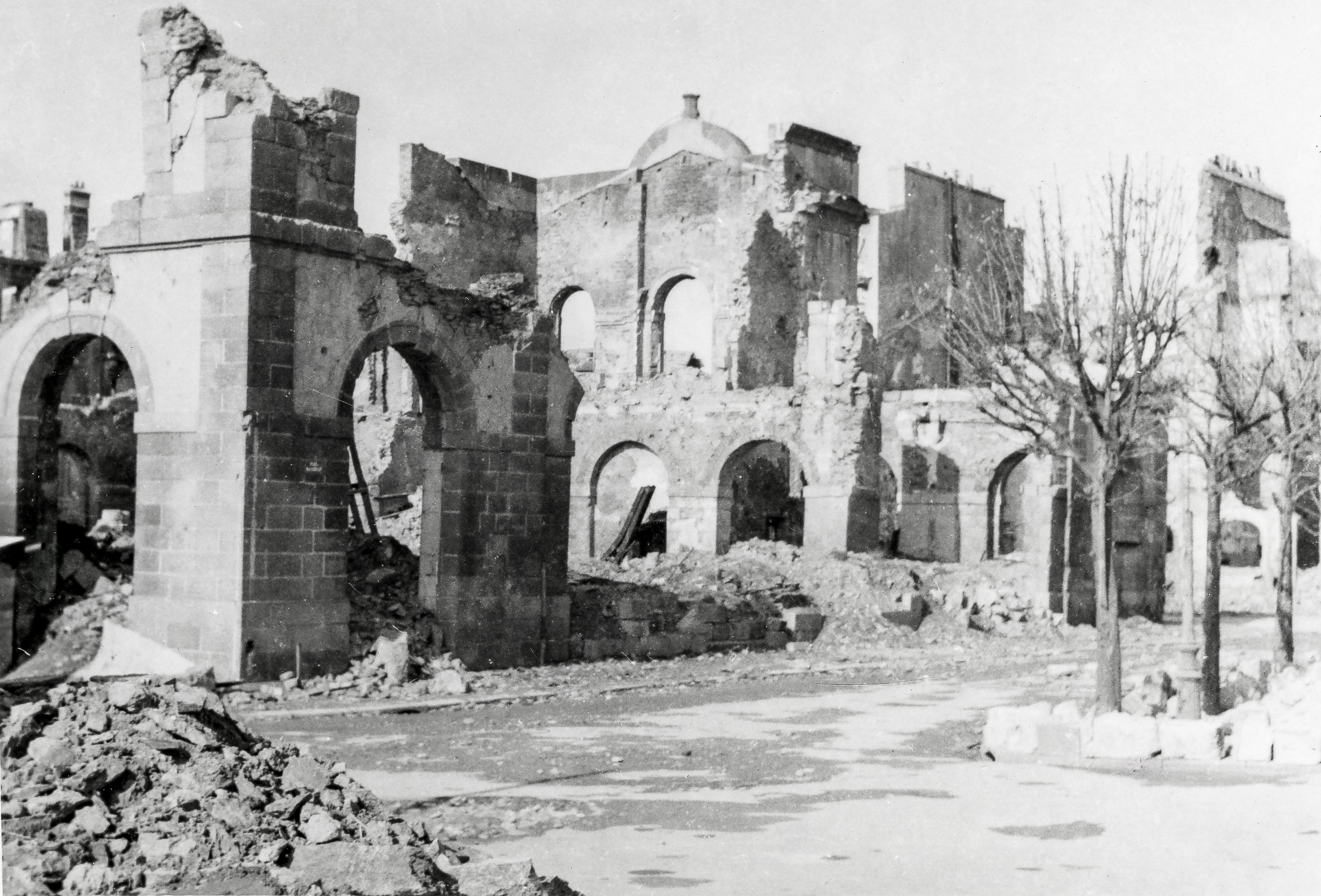

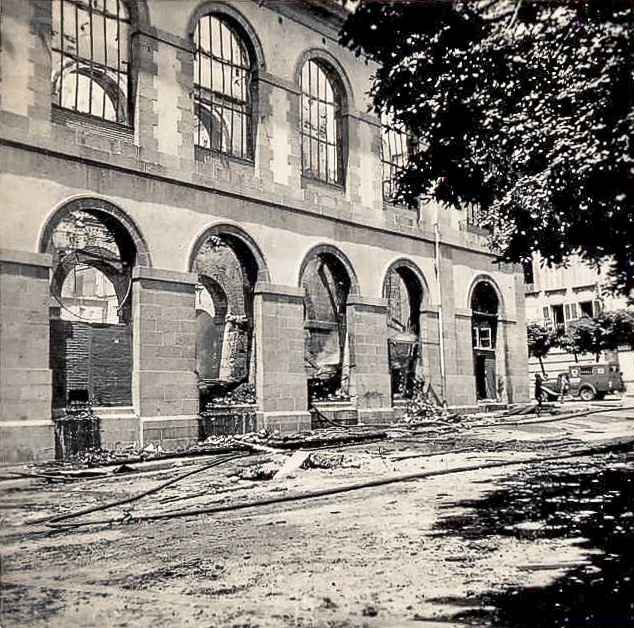

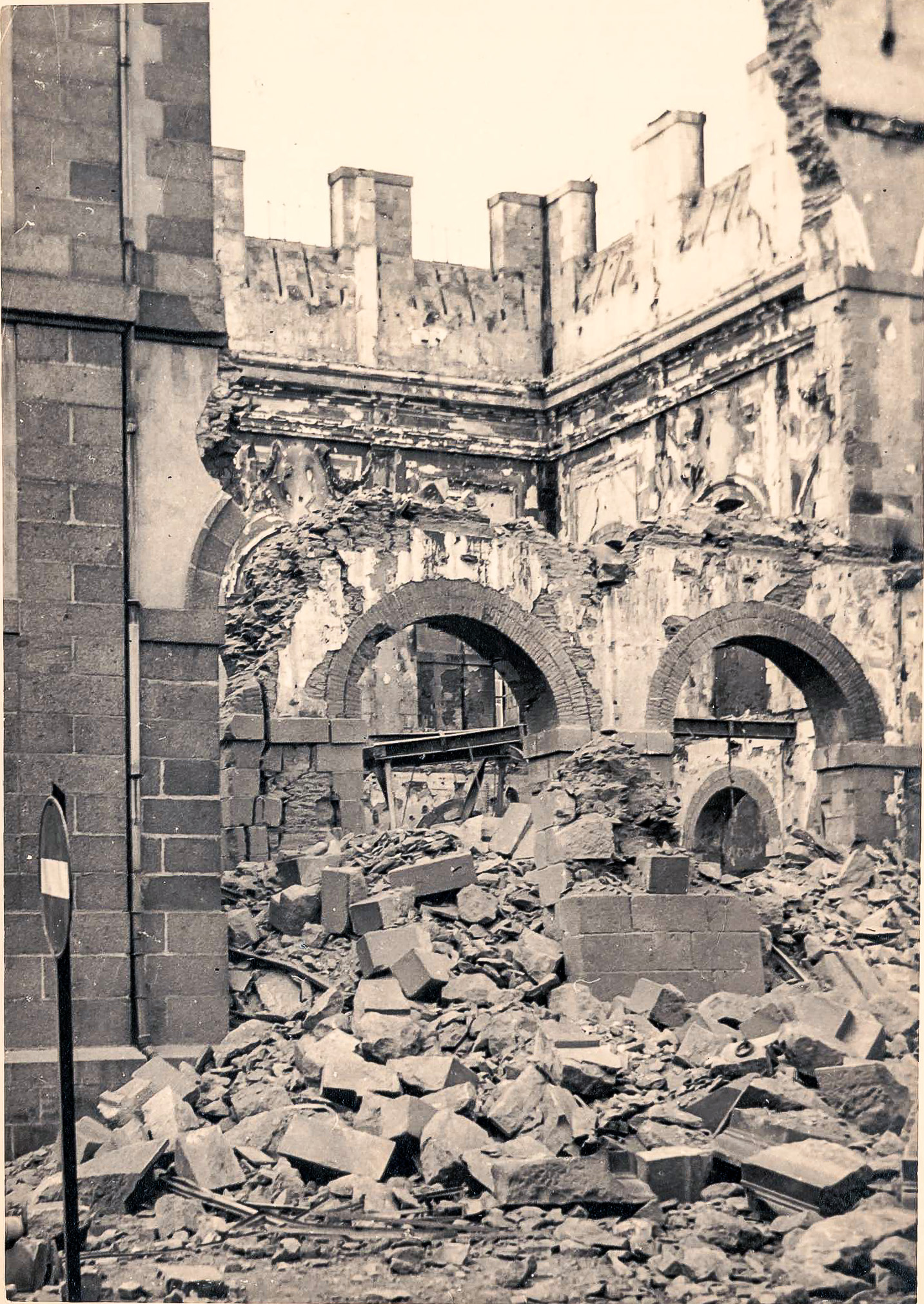

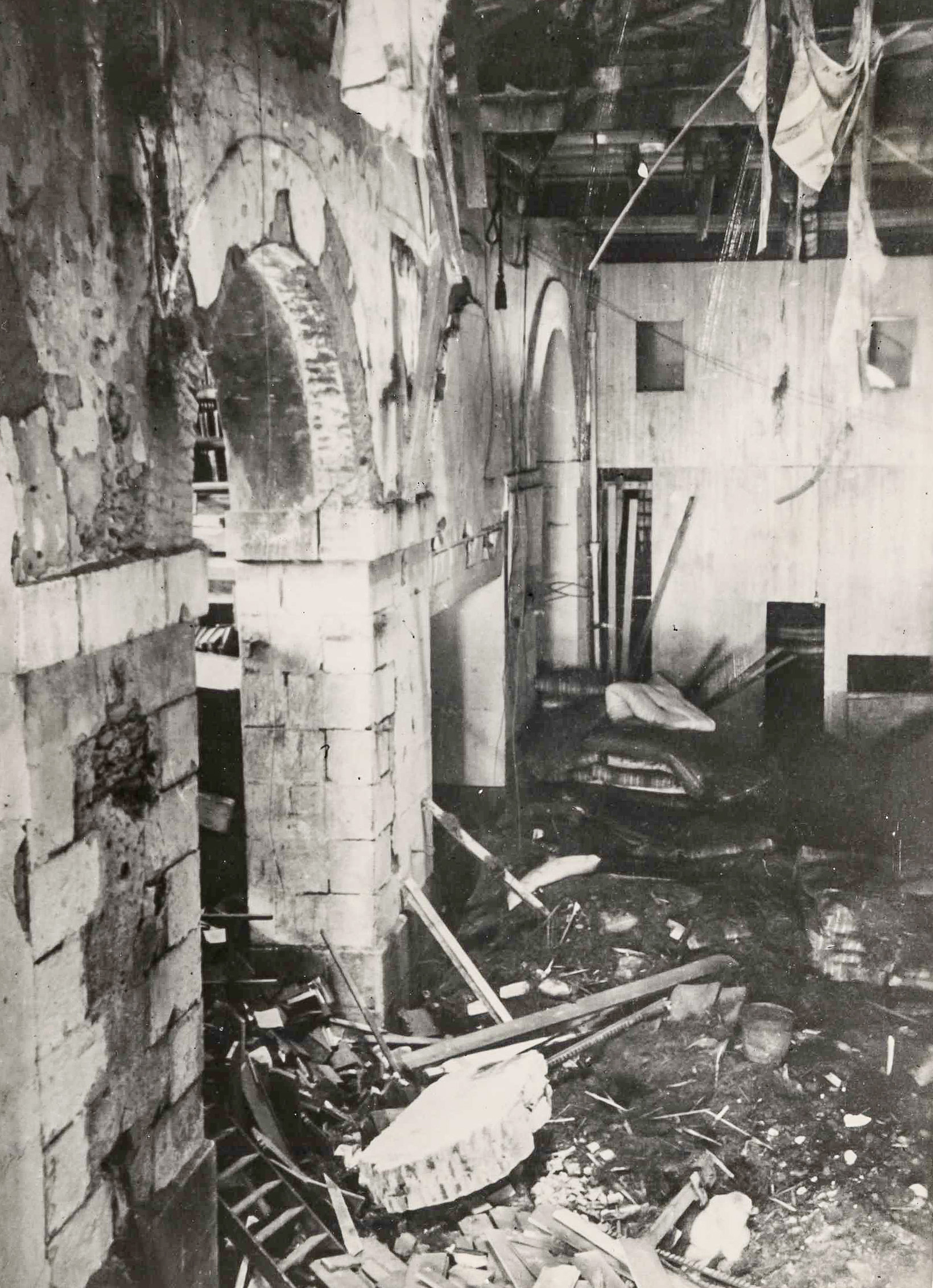

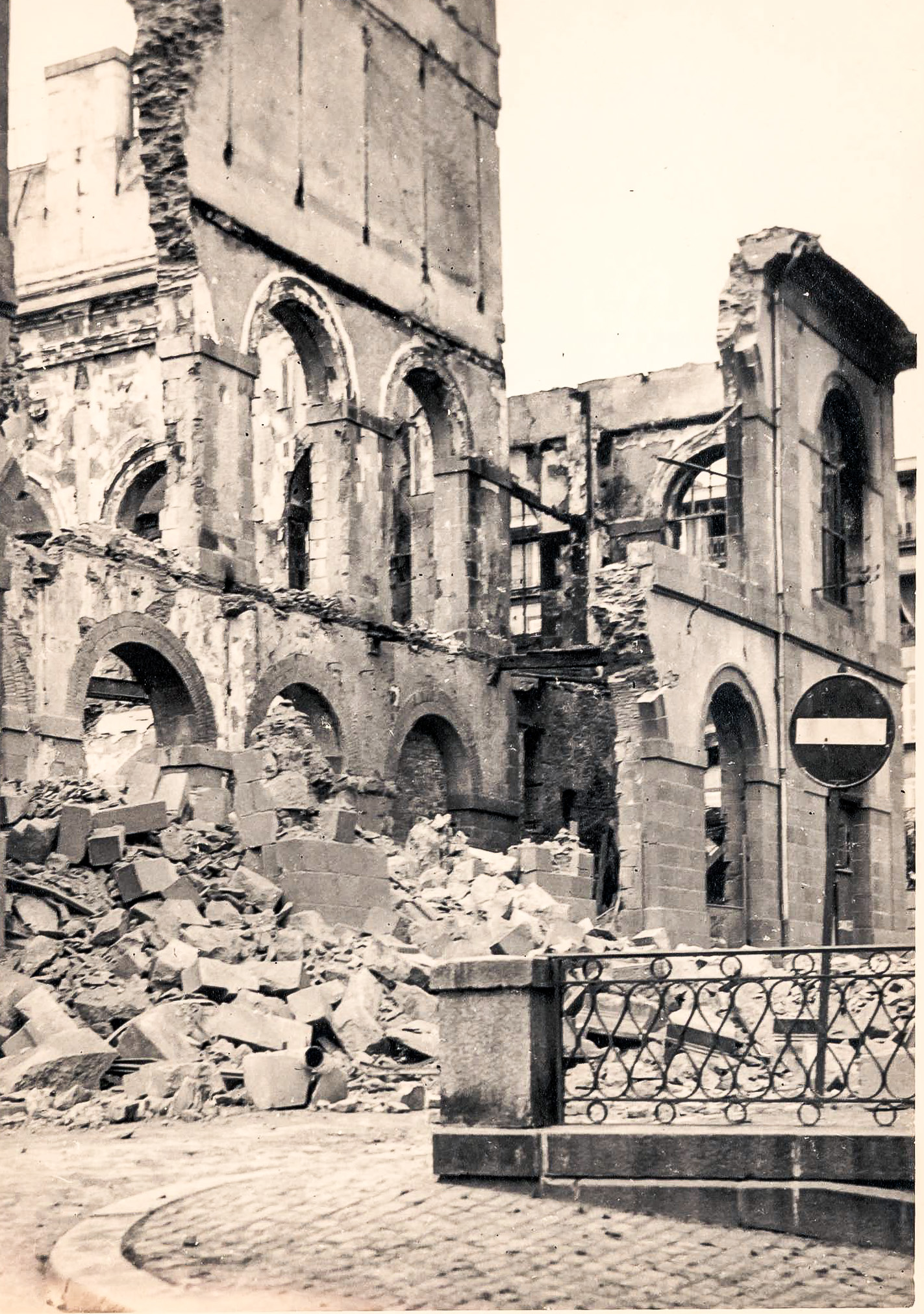

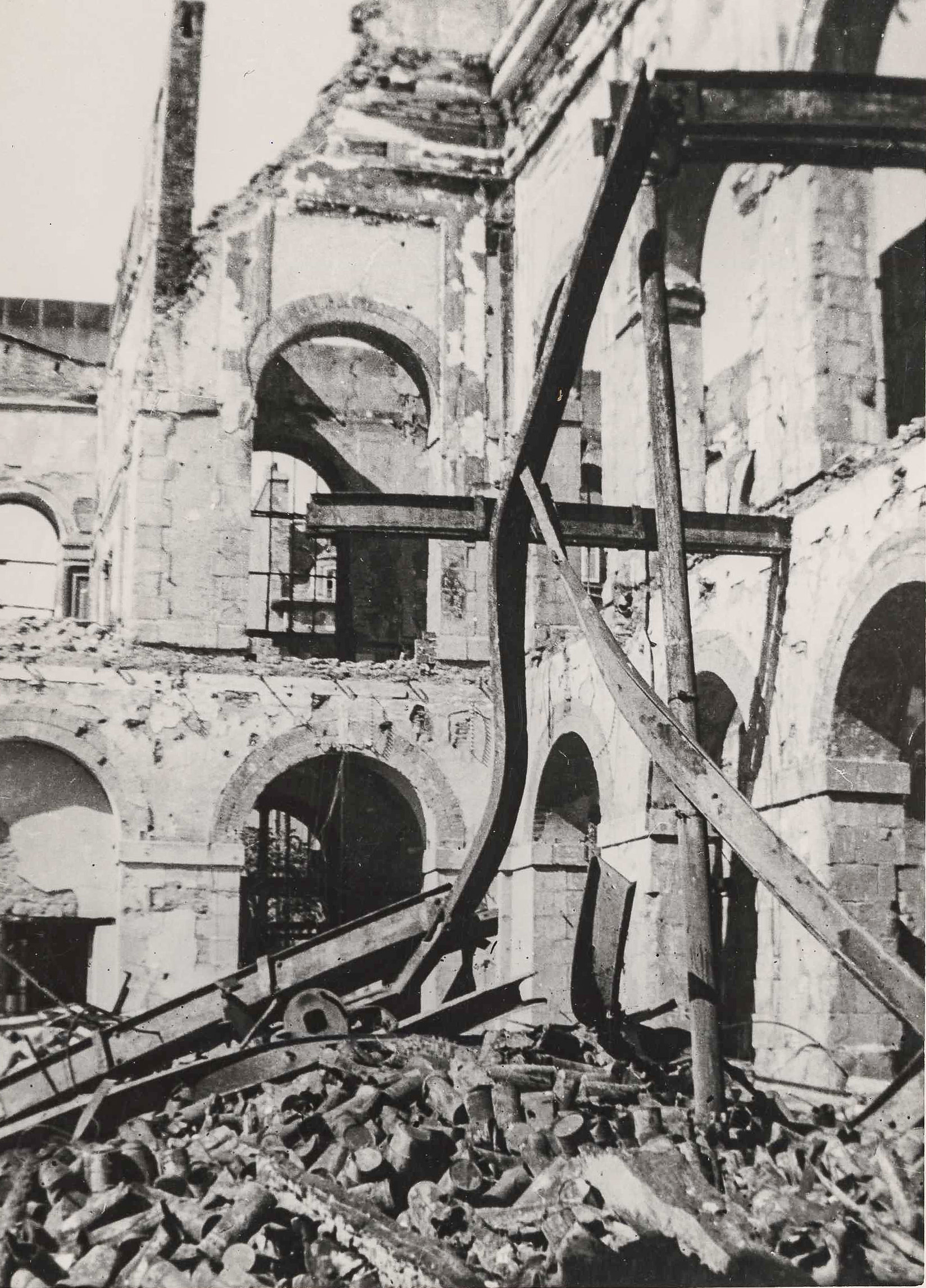

== Collections ==
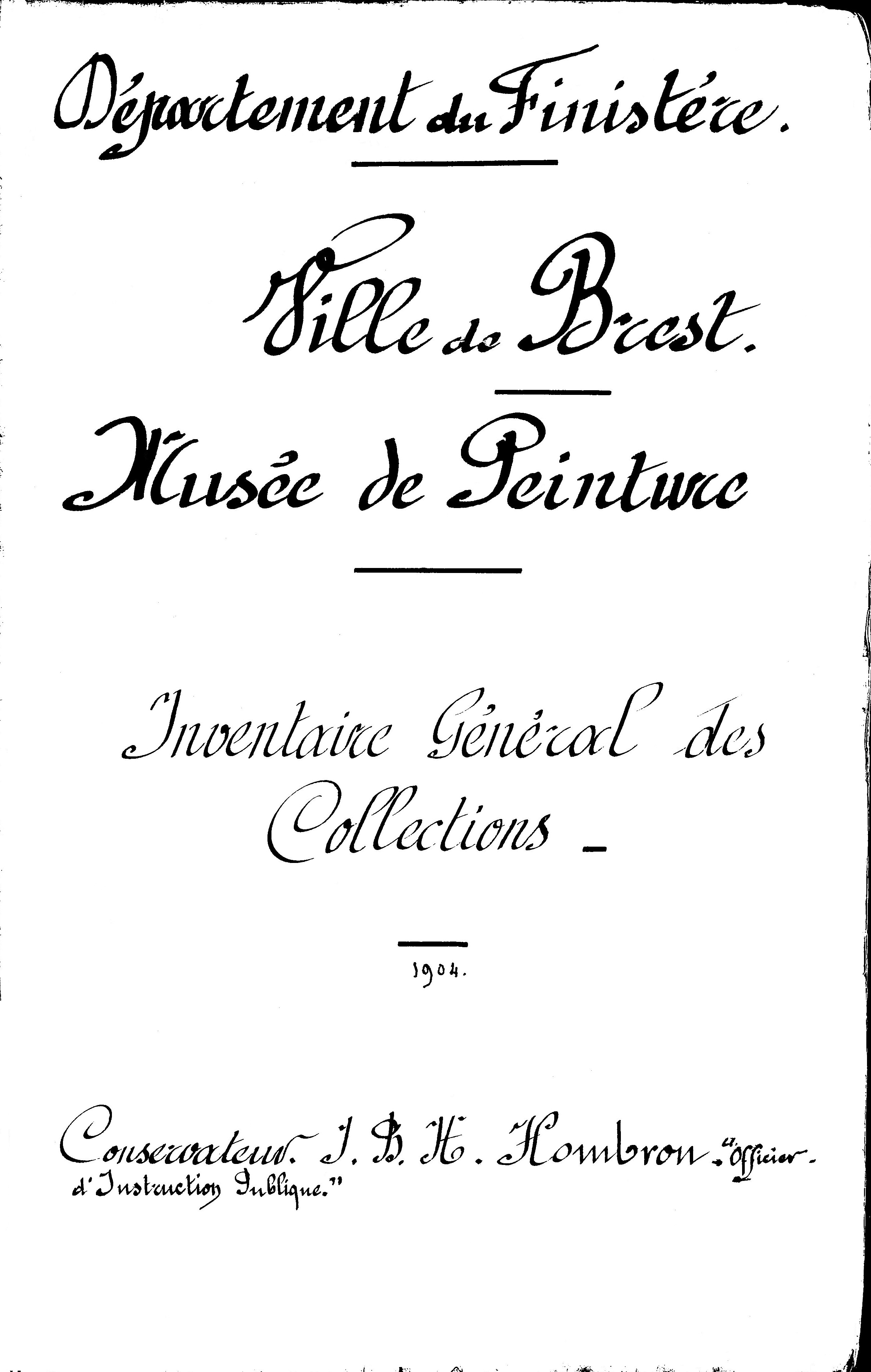
Front cover of the inventory of Brest's "musée de peinture", 1904

The collection was built up in stages, with the first catalogue (written by curator Henri Hombron in 1892) encompassing 228 paintings, 291 engravings and drawings and 38 sculptures.

=== 16th-18th centuries ===
- Italy - Jacopo Bassano, Palma il Giovane, Carlo Saraceni, Guercino, Carlo Dolci, Daniele Crespi, Giuseppe Recco, Giuseppe Cesari, Pietro della Vecchia, Jacopo Vignali, Luca Giordano (Saint Luke Painting the Virgin), Canaletto and Pompeo Batoni.
- France - Charles Antoine Coypel, Jacques Courtois, Charles de La Fosse, Louis-Nicolas Van Blarenberghe, Charles-Joseph Natoire, Jean-François de Troy, Sébastien Bourdon, Henry d'Arles, Jean-Laurent Mosnier, François-Édouard Cibot, Auguste Couder, Jean-Baptiste Regnault and Carle van Loo.
- Flanders, Netherlands, Germany - Bonaventura Peeters, Bartholomeus Breenbergh, Herman van Swanevelt, Jan Weenix, Leonard Bramer and Angelica Kauffmann.

=== 19th century to present ===
This period in the collections is dominated by French work, including Romantics, Academics, Post-Impressionists, Symbolists and Surrealists and artists such as Eugène Isabey, Alexandre-Gabriel Decamps, Eugène Fromentin, Suzanne Valadon, Maurice Utrillo and Maurice Asselin. There is a major focus on Brest's history, seascapes and Breton painters such as Jean-Jacques Morvan. The "salle Charles Estienne" displays artists close to lyrical abstraction, geometric abstraction and Art Brut such as Yves Tanguy, Marcelle Loubchansky, Jean Degottex, Jean Deyrolle, René Duvillier, Jan Krizek and François Dilasser.

Also represented are the Pont-Aven School and Les Nabis (Henri-Gabriel Ibels, Henri Delavallée, Claude-Émile Schuffenecker, Henry Moret, Armand Seguin, Émile Bernard, Maxime Maufra, Édouard Manet, Pierre Bonnard, Georges Lacombe, Paul Sérusier, Maurice Denis, Julie Delance-Feurgard, Albert Clouard and Jean-Julien Lemordant), Orientalists such as Paul Leroy, Charles de Tournemine and Anna Quinquaud and Symbolists such as Edgar Maxence, Henri Martin, Alexandre Séon, Eugène Carrière, Lucien Levy-Dhurmer, René Ménard, Charles-Marie Dulac and Léon Spilliaert.

== Gallery ==
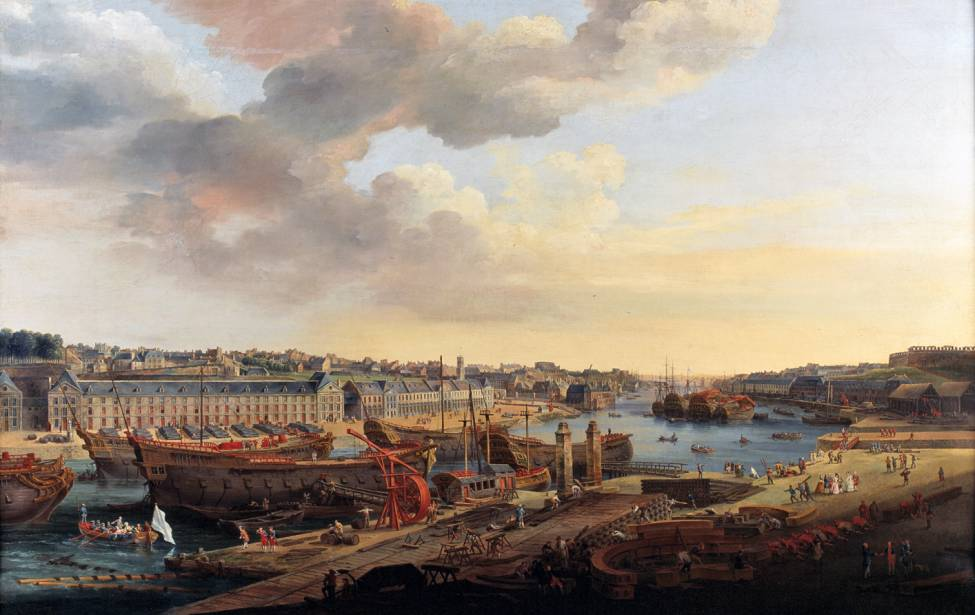
Louis-Nicolas Van Blarenberghe, The Port of Brest from the Terrasse des Capucins

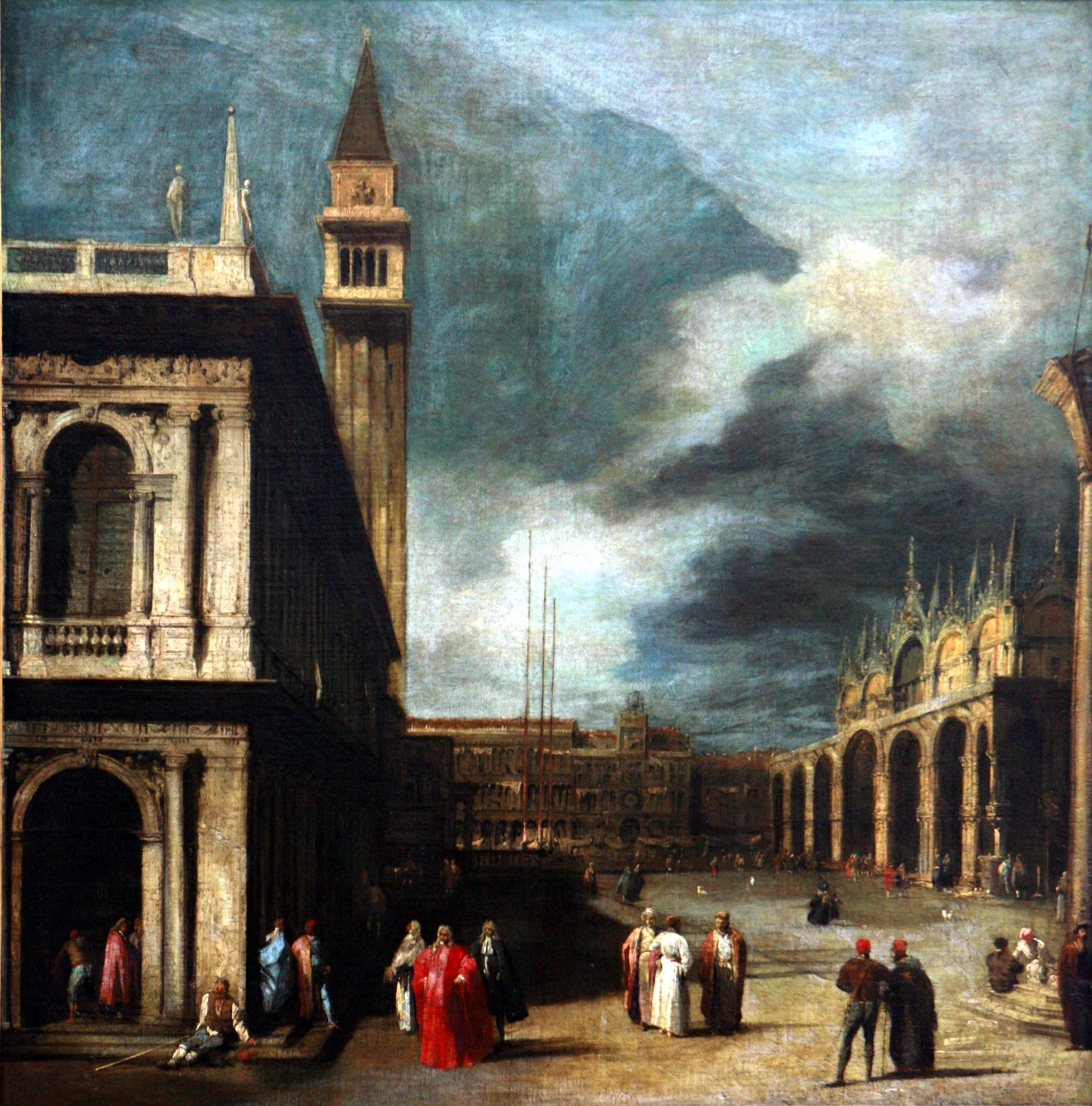
Canaletto, Venice, Piazza San Marco

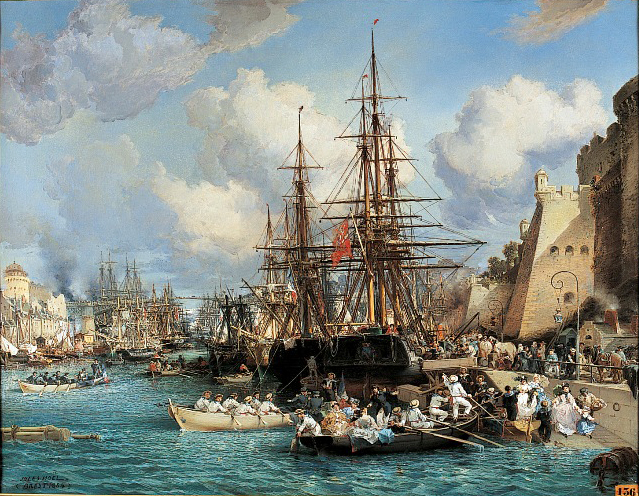
Jules Noël, Port of Brest

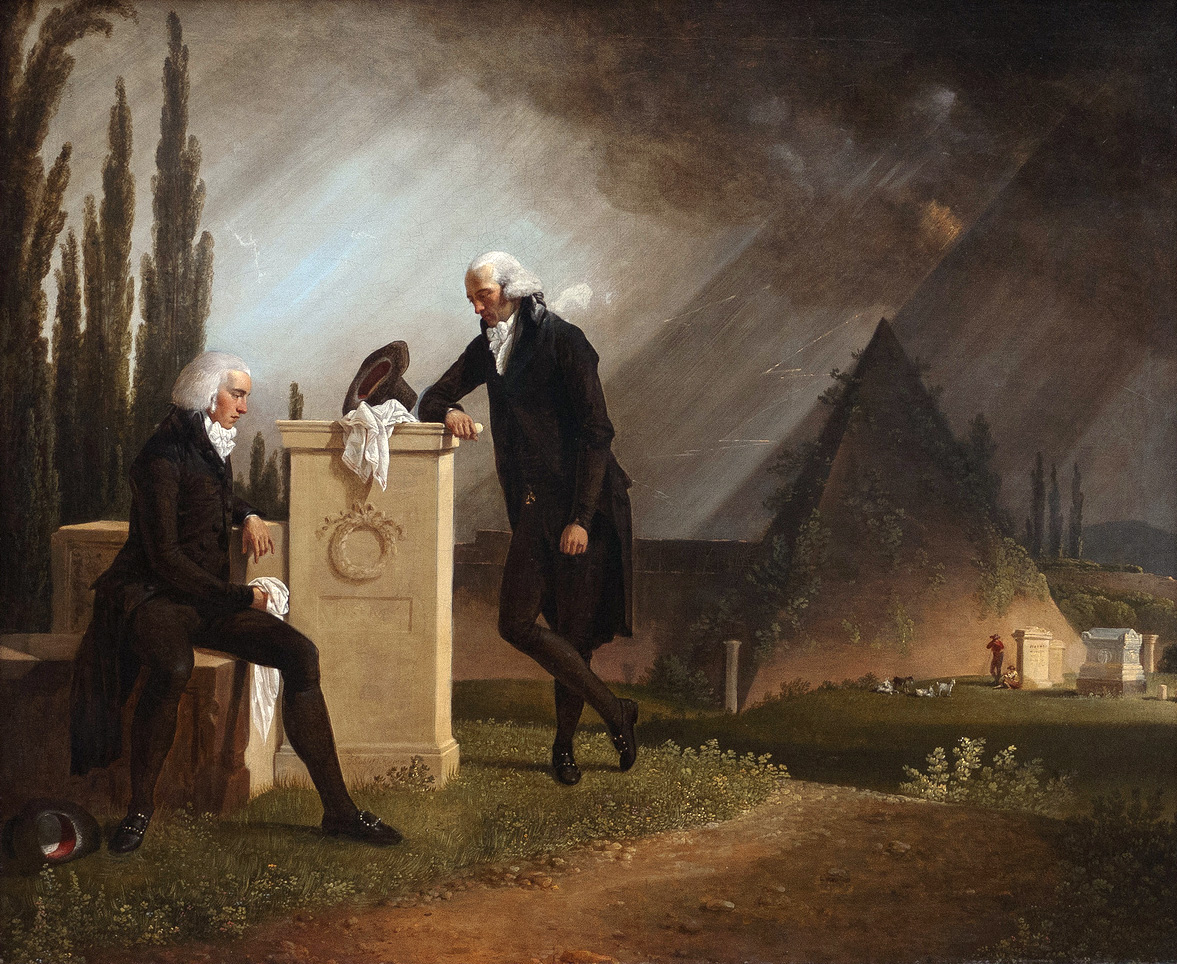
Jacques Sablet, Roman Elegy (1791)

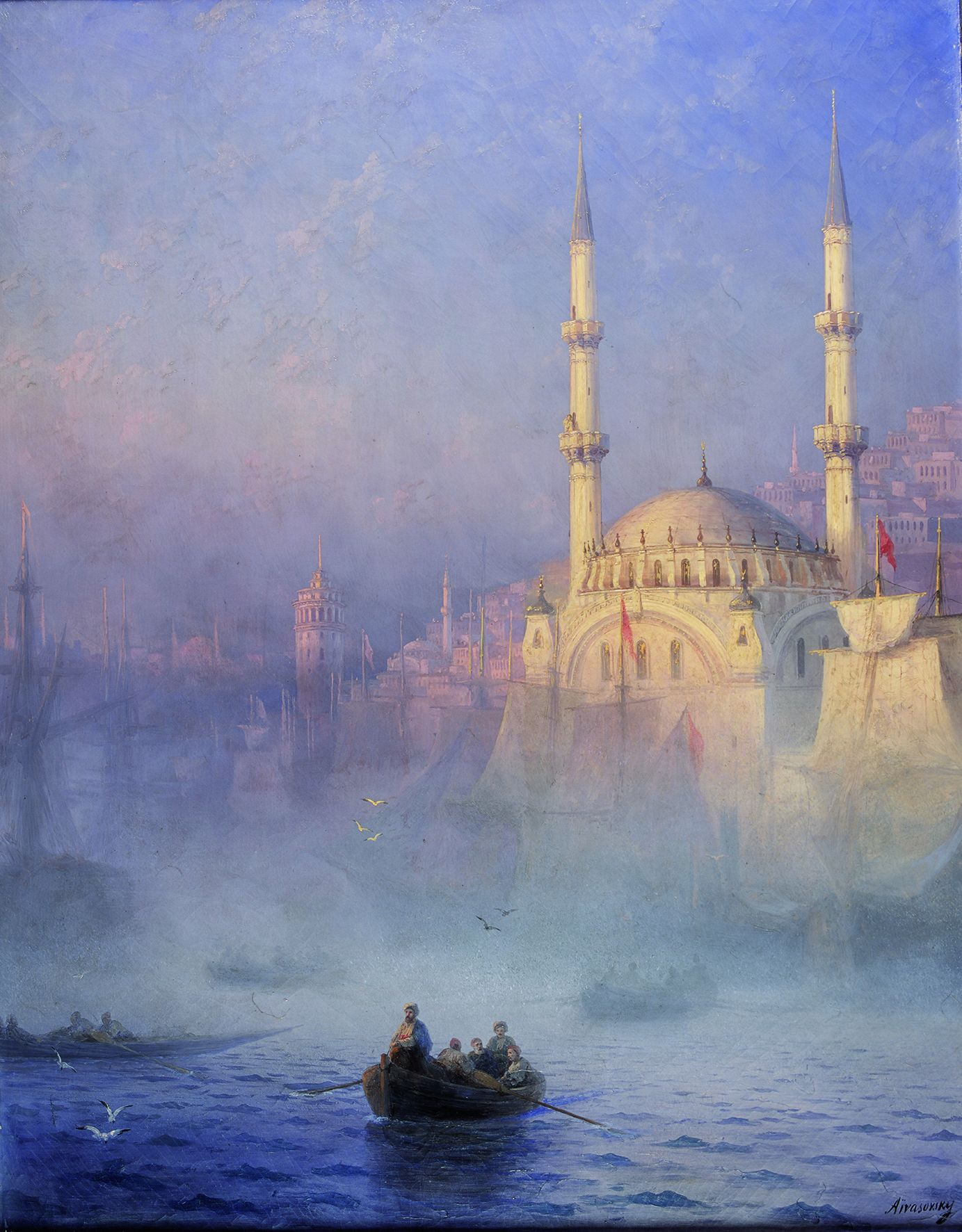
Ivan Aivazovsky, Constantinople, Nusretiye Mosque

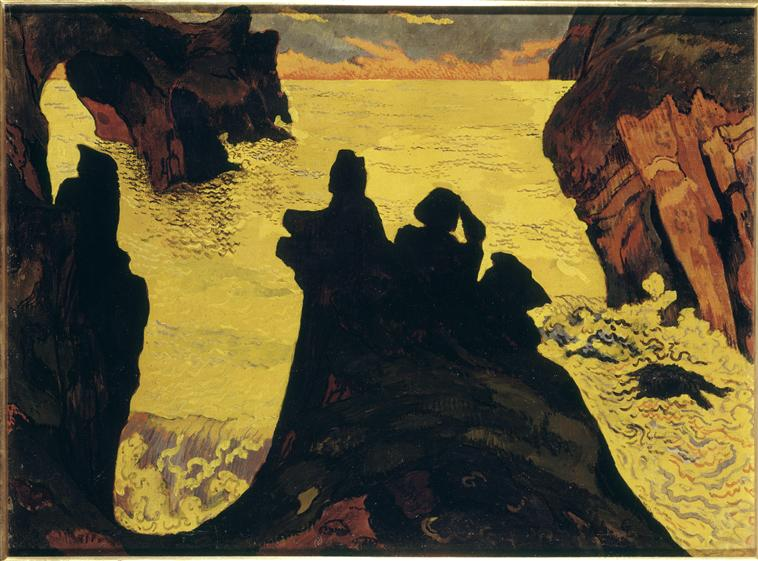
Georges Lacombe, Yellow Sea, Camaret

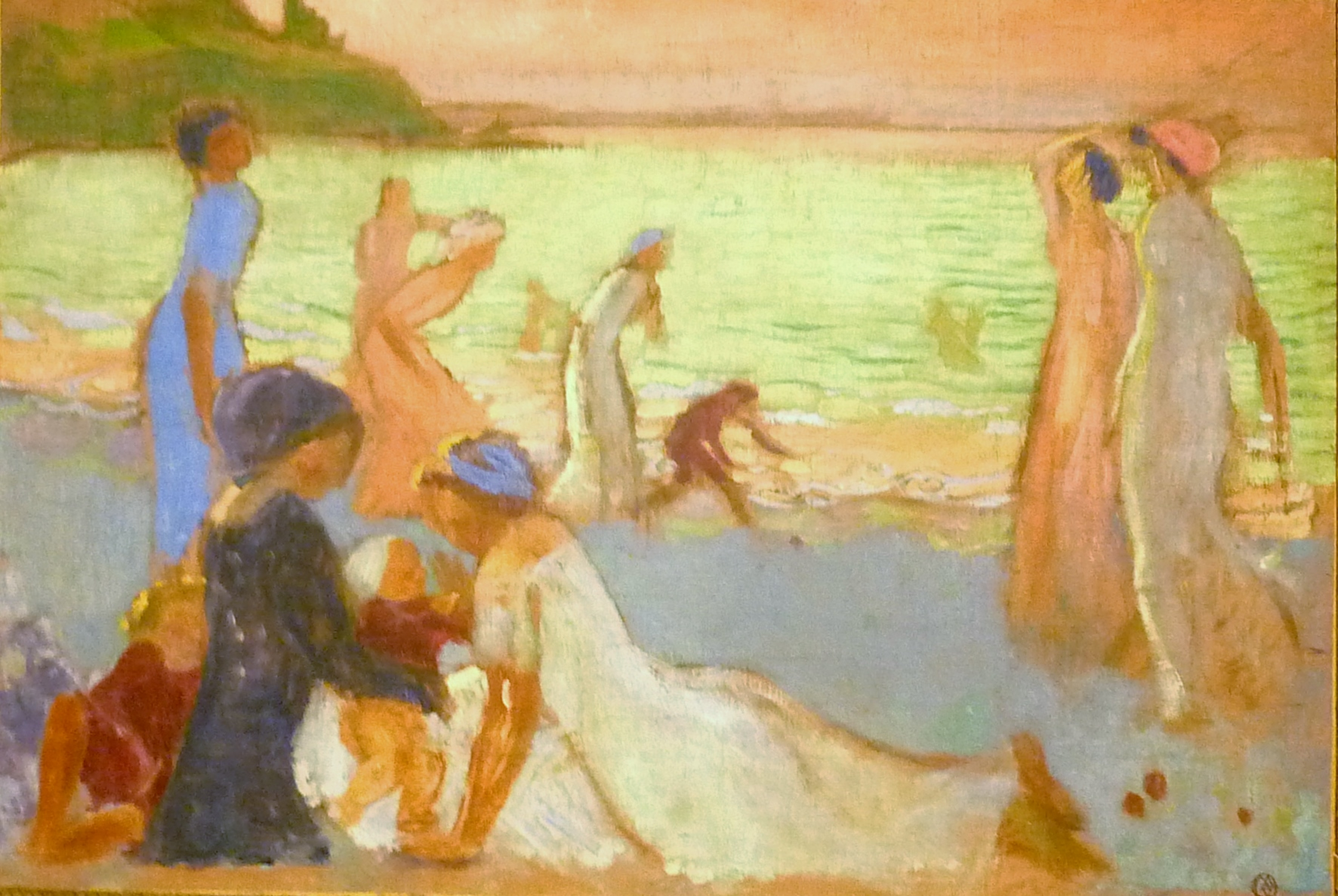
Maurice Denis, September Evening

== Bibliography ==
- (in French) Yves Coativy, « La société académique de Brest et la naissance du premier musée », Les Cahiers de l'Iroise, no 226, avril-juin 2017, p. 52-68 (online)

== External links (in French) ==
- Modélisation 3D de l'extérieur de la halle aux blés qui comprenait le premier musée sur Wiki-Brest, par Mylène et Daniel Larvor.
- Official site
- Virtual visit
