= Ekaterina Feodorovna Baryatinskaya-Dolgorukova =

Russian noblewoman

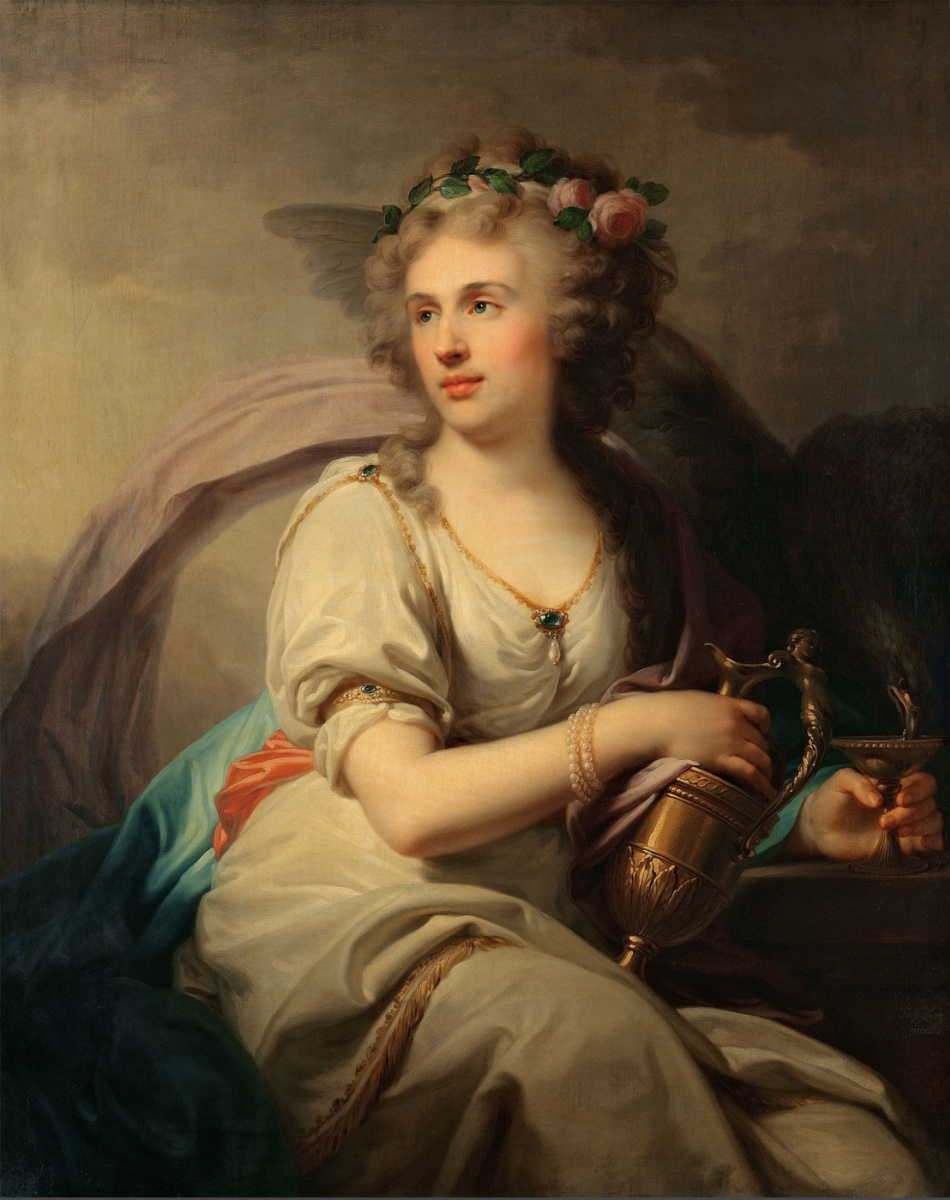
Ekaterina as Hebe

Ekaterina Feodorovna Baryatinskaya-Dolgorukova (29 October 1769 – 30 October 1849) was a Russian court official.

== Life ==
She was the only child of marshal Feodor Baryatinsky (1742-1814) and his wife princess Maria Vasilevna Chovanskaya (died 1813). Ekaterina came to public attention in 1785, aged 17, during a stay at the Anichkov Palace as a guest of Grigory Potemkin, and soon afterwards became a lady in waiting to the empress In January 1786 she married prince Vasily Vasilevich Dolgorukov (1752-1812), with whom she had five children:

- Vasily (27 March 1786 – 12 December 1858), married Barbara Sergeevna Gagarin, three children
- Nikolai Vasilevich (8 October 1789 – 2 June 1872), married Ekaterina Golitsyn
- Ekaterina (21 April 1791 – 18 January 1863), married count Sergej Nikolayevich Saltykov, no issue
- Alexandr Vasilevich (1794-1795)
- Sofia (born and died 1798)

After their marriage the young couple settled in Saint Petersburg. They also spent two years in Dresden before travelling to Vienna and Paris before returning to Russia. The outbreak of war with France prevented another trip to France and so instead Ekaterina and her three children spent winter 1804-1805 in Naples. In August 1806 they moved to Vienna before returning to Russia in July 1807. Her husband died of apoplexy in 1812, leaving her with half a million roubles in debt. She was made a grand cross of the Order of Saint Catherine in 1841.

== Sources ==
- http://www.as-pushkin.net/pushkin/text/zametki/dnevnik-pushkina-1834.htm#al273
