= Jean-François Sablet =

French painter

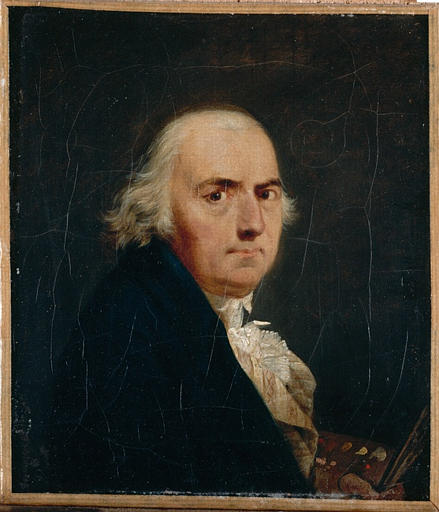
Self-portrait (date unknown)

Jean-François Sablet (23 November 1745 – 24 February 1819) was a French painter; part of a family of artists of Swiss origin.

== Biography ==
Jean-François Sablet was born in Morges. He studied with his father, the painter and picture dealer Jacob Sablet (1720–1798), before moving to Paris in 1772. There, he and his younger brother Jacques-Henri Sablet (1749–1803) both studied at the Académie royale de peinture et de sculpture as pupils of Joseph-Marie Vien. Jean-François studied at the Académie from 1768 to 1773 and Jacques-Henri from 1772 to 1775. Although their careers did not follow a similar course, the attribution of their works has frequently been confused.

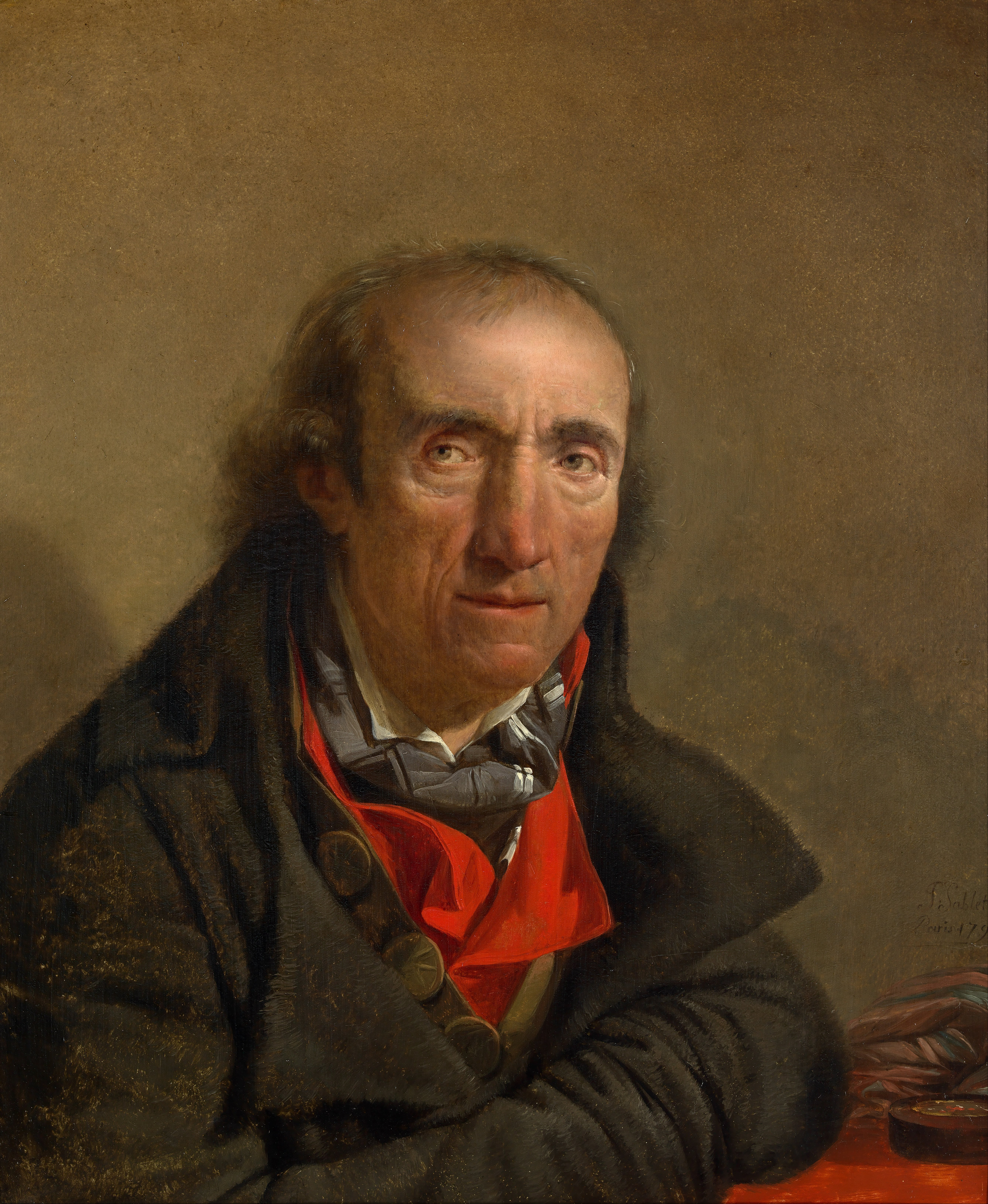
Portrait of a Conventionnaire

Among Jean-François Sablet's early portraits are those of Charles de Bourbon, Comte d'Artois, as Colonel General of the Swiss and Grison Guards (1774; ex-Bourbon-Chalus Collection, Paris) and Charles-Henri, Comte d'Estaing (untraced). He also painted genre scenes, such as Childhood in the Country and Visit to the Wet-nurse (both untraced), and mythological scenes (e.g. Nationalmuseum, Stockholm).

In 1791 Jean-François left Paris for Rome to join his brother Jacques-Henri. While there he concentrated on landscapes, also depicting people in local costume. In February 1793 Jean-François Sablet was obliged to leave Rome with the rest of the French community and by October was in Paris as a member of the Revolutionary Commune des Arts. He produced a number of Revolutionary portraits, including Joseph-Agricol Viala, William Tell and Lycurgus (all untraced), but spent most of his time quietly in Normandy. In 1802 he worked in Paris for the printmakers Francesco Piranesi (1758-1810) and his brother Pietro Piranesi (1773-after 1807), the sons of Giovanni Battista Piranesi. In 1805 he established himself in Nantes, producing small-scale portraits of the city's notables with sometimes scathing sincerity. In 1812 he decorated the Le Palais de la Bourse in Nantes, with six large grisailles depicting the Visit of Napoleon to Nantes in 1808 (untraced).

He died in Nantes in 1819.

== Sources ==
- Web Gallery of Art, Biography Jean-François Sablets (b. 1745, Morges, Vaud, d. 1819, Nantes).
- Larousse, "Dictionnaire de la peinture", Sablet.
- Artnet, Jean-François Sablet.
