= Jacques Sablet =

Swiss-French painter

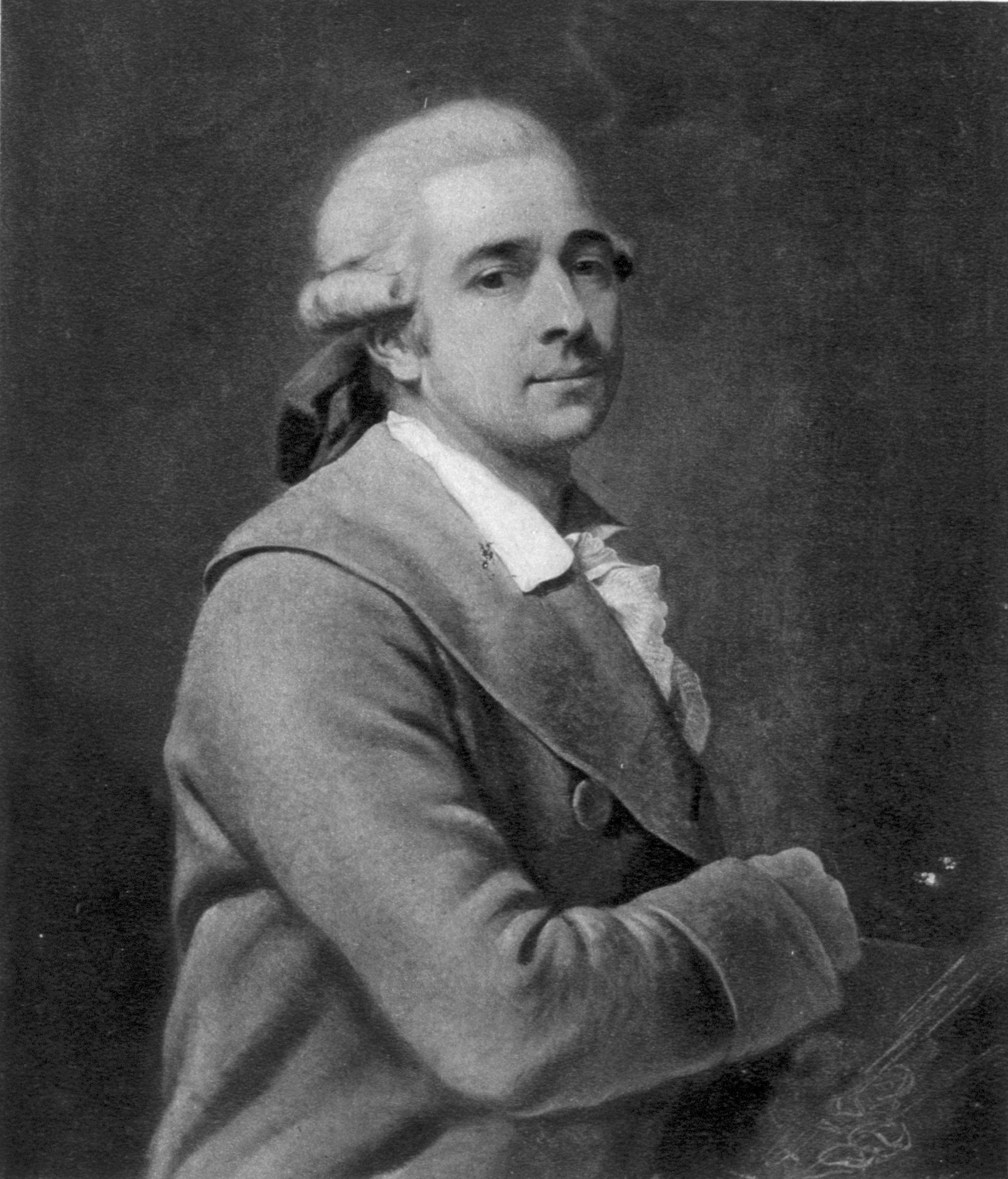
Self-portrait of Jacques-Henri Sablet

Jacques-Henri Sablet (b. 28 Jan. 1749, Morges, † 22 Aug.1803, Paris) was a Swiss-French painter, part of a family of artists of Swiss origin. He was also known as Franz der Römer, Giacomo Sablez, Giacomo Sablé, Jacob Henry Sablet, Sablet le Jeune, Sablet le Romain or le peintre du Soleil.

== Early life ==
Sablet was born in Morges, near Lausanne. After a brief local training in Lausanne studying with his father, the painter and picture dealer Jacob Sablet (b. 4 April 1720, Morges - † 29 April 1798, Lausanne), and a slight detour to Lyon, he was moving to Paris in 1772. There, he and his older brother Jean-François Sablet (1745–1819) studied at the Académie royale de peinture et de sculpture as pupils of Joseph-Marie Vien. Jean-François studied at the Académie in 1768–1773 and Jacques-Henri in 1772–1775. Although their careers did not follow a similar course, the attribution of their works has frequently been confused.

== Roman Period ==
When in 1775 Vien was named director of the French Academy in Rome, Sablet accompanied him there. In Rome he painted "Les premiers pas de l'enfance" ("Primi passi", in Italian) (1789), which now belongs to the Pedriali Collection (Collezione Pedriali), in the Museo Civico di San Domenico, of Forlì (Italy).

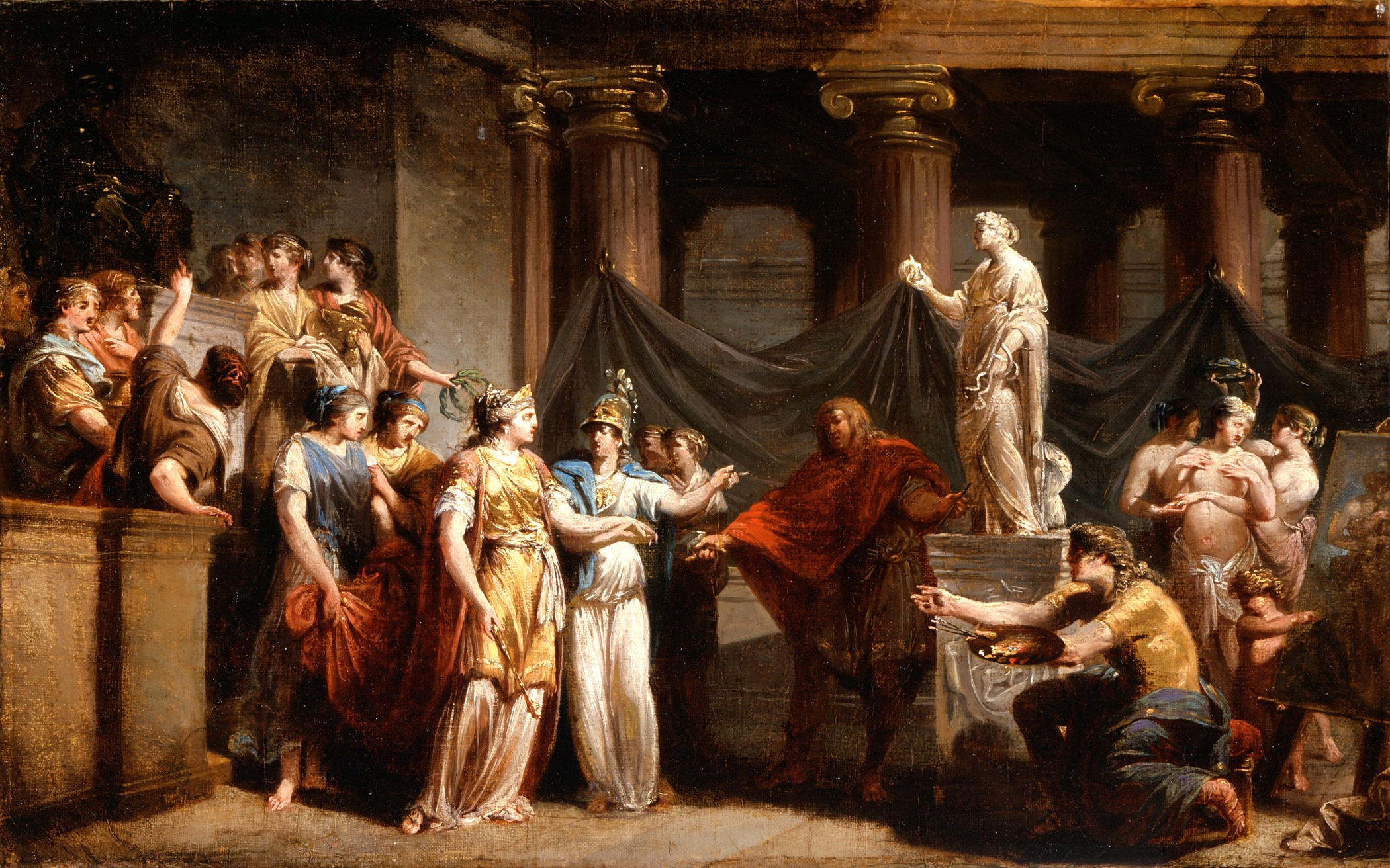
"Allegory of the City of Bern" aka "The Temple of the Liberal Arts, with the City of Bern and the Goddess Minerva" (1779) by Jacques Sablet (Coll. LACMA)

His ambition was really to be a history painter : he won second prize at the Accademia di San Luca with "Erminie et les bergers" (1777) and first prize at the Parma competition with "La mort de Pallas" (1778). He then painted an "Allégorie de la République de Berne protégeant les Arts" (Allegory of the Republic of Bern protecting the arts) and other mythological subjects such as "Helen Saved by Venus from the Wrath of Aeneas", now both at LACMA, and "Mars and Minerva", without obtaining the necessary encouragement or commissions, facing stiff competition from the likes of Jacques-Louis David and Pierre Peyron, among others, and lacking solid academic training.

So instead, at the age of 32, he turned to portraiture, genre painting, and landscape painting. Most of his genre scenes depicted the city's everyday life and customs of the Campagna (countryside).

In Rome, bustling street scenes featuring contemporaries in local attire became a successful genre in the 2nd half of the 18th century. Popular with tourists on their Grand Tour, they were an important source of income for foreign artists such as Jacques Sablet and Louis Ducros, both natives of the Swiss canton of Vaud. The pair worked briefly together in 1781-1782 to produce plain and coloured etchings. During that period, they published a series of twelve engravings, entitled "Scènes et costumes italiens" (Italian Scenes and Costumes). The engravings and aquatints, which excel at fine-grained detailing, were drawn by Sablet and engraved by Ducros to imitate wash ("lavis" in French) , a technique perfected by Jean-Baptiste Le Prince to create the illusion of an original drawing. In 1782 Ducros also executed a large composition in wash together with Sablet: "Scène d'enterrement dans un cimetière" (Burial scene in a cemetery), in a landscape format, with numerous figures arranged in the manner of low-reliefs.

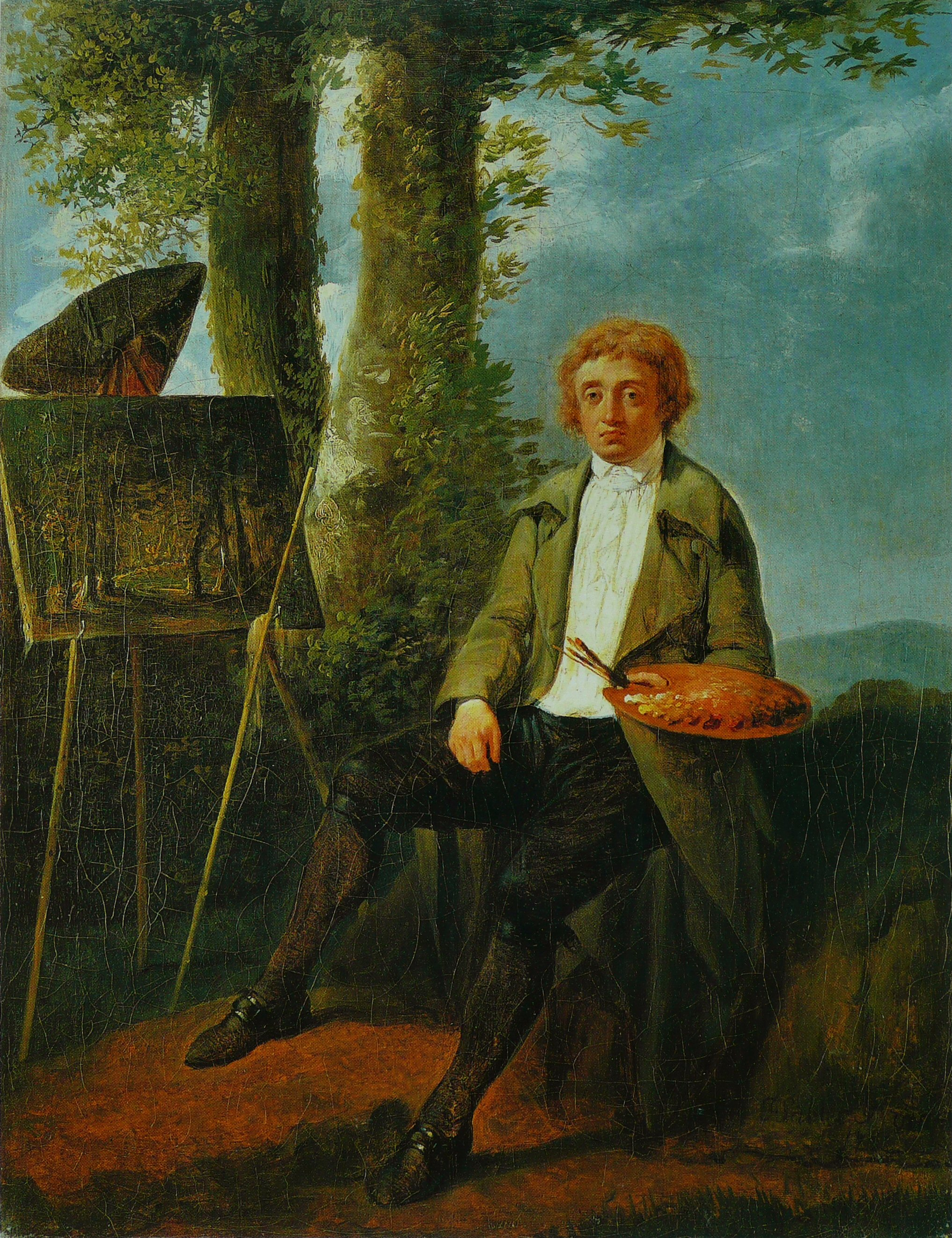
"Portrait of the painter Conrad Gessner" (1788), (Kunsthaus Zürich)

After breaking up with Ducros, he leaves to settle with Jean-Pierre Saint-Ours near Santa Maria del Popolo. In 1782 he entered the Académie des Arcades de Rome (l’Accademia dell’Arcadia) and began to make a name for himself: he was a friend of Salomon Gessner (his son Conrad went to live with him in 1787 and shared his studio), Johann Heinrich Wilhelm Tischbein, known as the Goethe Tischbein, Alexander Trippel (Schaffhausen, 1744 - Rome, 1793), Johann Friedrich Reiffenstein and Carl Ludwig Hackert (Prenzlau, 1740 - Morges, 1796), brother of Jacob Philipp Hackert.

As said earlier, he abandoned history painting for genre painting: from 1784 onwards, Gustav III of Sweden would acquire "Les divertissements napolitains" (Neapolitan entertainments) and "Le dévouement d'un père de famille" (The Self-sacrifice of a Father), among other subjects of miscellaneous events or inspired by Jean-Baptiste Greuze. The critics did not spare their praise. Linked with the French milieu, the architects Percier and Fontaine, the painters Henri-Pierre Danloux, Lethière, Michallon, Alexandre-Hyacinthe Dunouy, Jean-Germain Drouais, the Flemish painter Simon Denis, a friend, and the English sculptor John Flaxman, he perfects an intimate portrait (Louis Masreliez, 1782), sometimes in a landscape (Conrad Gessner, 1788). He became famous for his scenes of Roman life and his «conversation pieces», such as the "Portrait de famille avec le Colisée" and its counterpart, the "Portrait de famille avec la Basilique de Maxence" (1791).

[Jacques-Henri Sablet shared a studio with history painter Hubert Drouais (?) ^{[ impossible, Hubert died in 1767 in Paris and, his son, François-Hubert also died in Paris, 21 October 1775, neither lived in Rome; maybe, instead, it concerns the grand-son, Jean-Germain, who was in Rome around that time...? ]} ]

== Exile and Return ==
He was enjoying the favours of society, when the aftermath of the French Revolution came: the riots were in the streets, and the French were forced into exile; with the rise of anti-French sentiment in the Papal States, Jacques Sablet, joined by his brother François, who indeed harboured revolutionary ideas, fled to Florence in 1793, where he was admitted to the Academy on the 3rd of May that same year. But perhaps because of the competition he would face there from Louis Gauffier he soon returned to Switzerland and then travelled to Paris. Back in Paris in January 1794, he was accepted, along with the other artists who had been forced to flee Rome, into the Société populaire et républicaine des Arts. He won a second prize that same year for his "Forgeron républicain" (engraved by Jacques Louis Copia). But the print which best recommends the name of the painter is the one that Copia published under this title: "Le Maréchal de la Vendée", signed : Sablet jeune pinxit, Copia sculpsit.

Staying at the Louvre, he exhibited regularly at the Salon: Italian scenes and landscapes seduced critics and great collectors such as François Cacault, Cardinal Fesch, Lucien Bonaparte. The latter, Minister of the Interior until November 5, 1800, reappointed Ambassador to Spain, took Sablet along on his brief Ambassadorship to Madrid in 1801, serving as an adviser on his art collection. He painted a Venus in a Mantilla (engraved by Pietro Parboni, Rome, 1783-1841) and died shortly after his return to Paris in 1803.

== Work ==
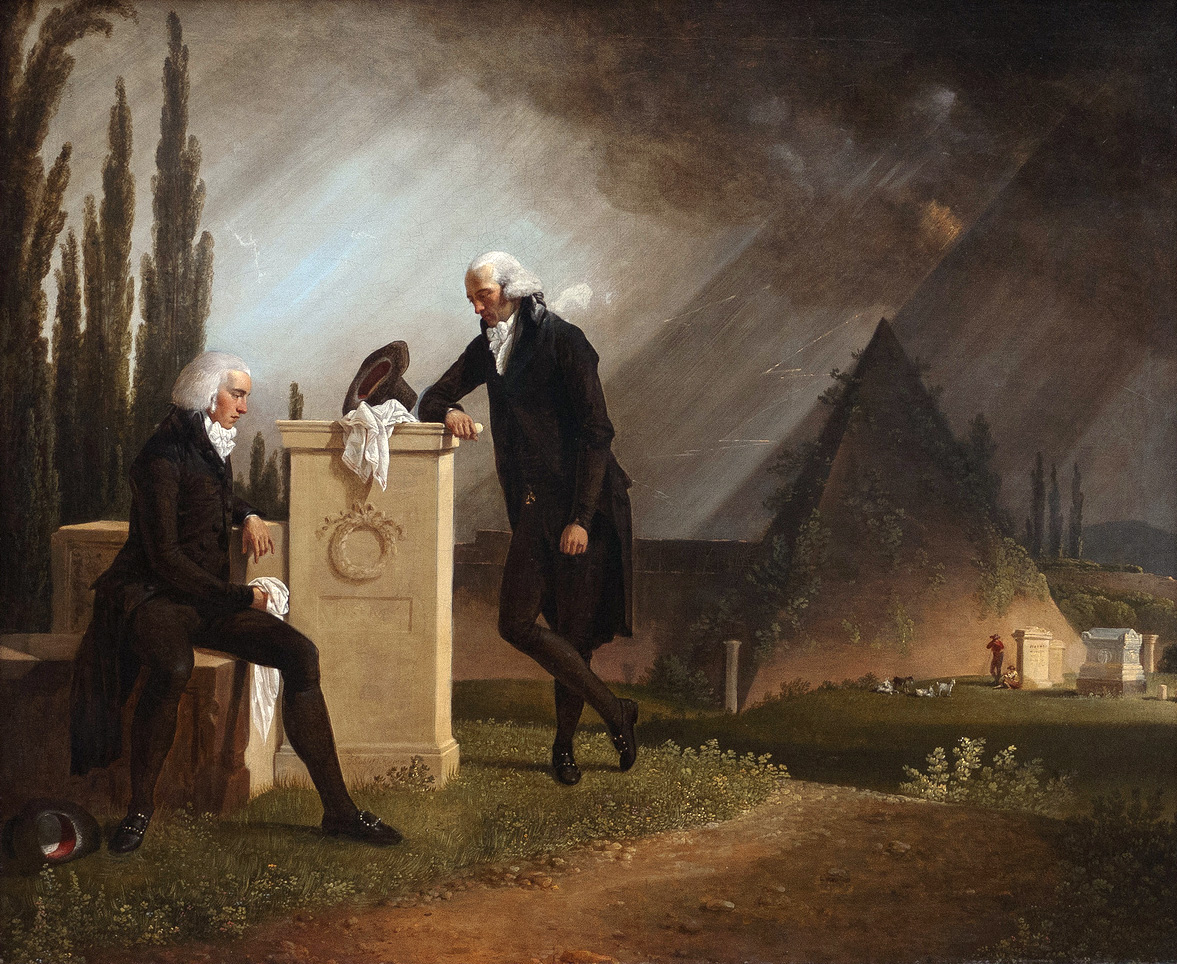
Roman Elegy, 1791

The painter's output being limited, few works have come down to us, some under other more prestigious names. He stood apart from the rest, and had to go abroad for his training and career: in Paris, he could not follow the academic curriculum, being a Protestant; in Rome, he had to find his admirers among the foreigners passing through. The events of 1789 turned Europe upside down: he lost his fortune but managed to rebuild it in Paris. After falling into oblivion, confused with his brother, the Gottfried Keller Foundation is responsible for bringing him out of obscurity.

Several of Sablet's oil paintings belonging to Letizia Bonaparte, mother of Napoleon and Lucien Bonaparte, gifted to Cardinal Fesch, her half-brother, in 1836, are still to be seen at the Palais Fesch in Ajaccio, Corsica, now a local art museum.

Other works can be seen at the Musée Cantonal des Beaux-Arts de Lausanne (MCBA), in the Palais de Rumine.

In addition, the Los Angeles County Museum of Art (LACMA), the Kunstmuseum Bern, the Musée des Beaux-Arts de Brest, the Nationalmuseum in Stockholm, the Museum Oskar Reinhart in Winterthur and the Kunsthaus Zürich all hold work by Sablet.

== Style ==
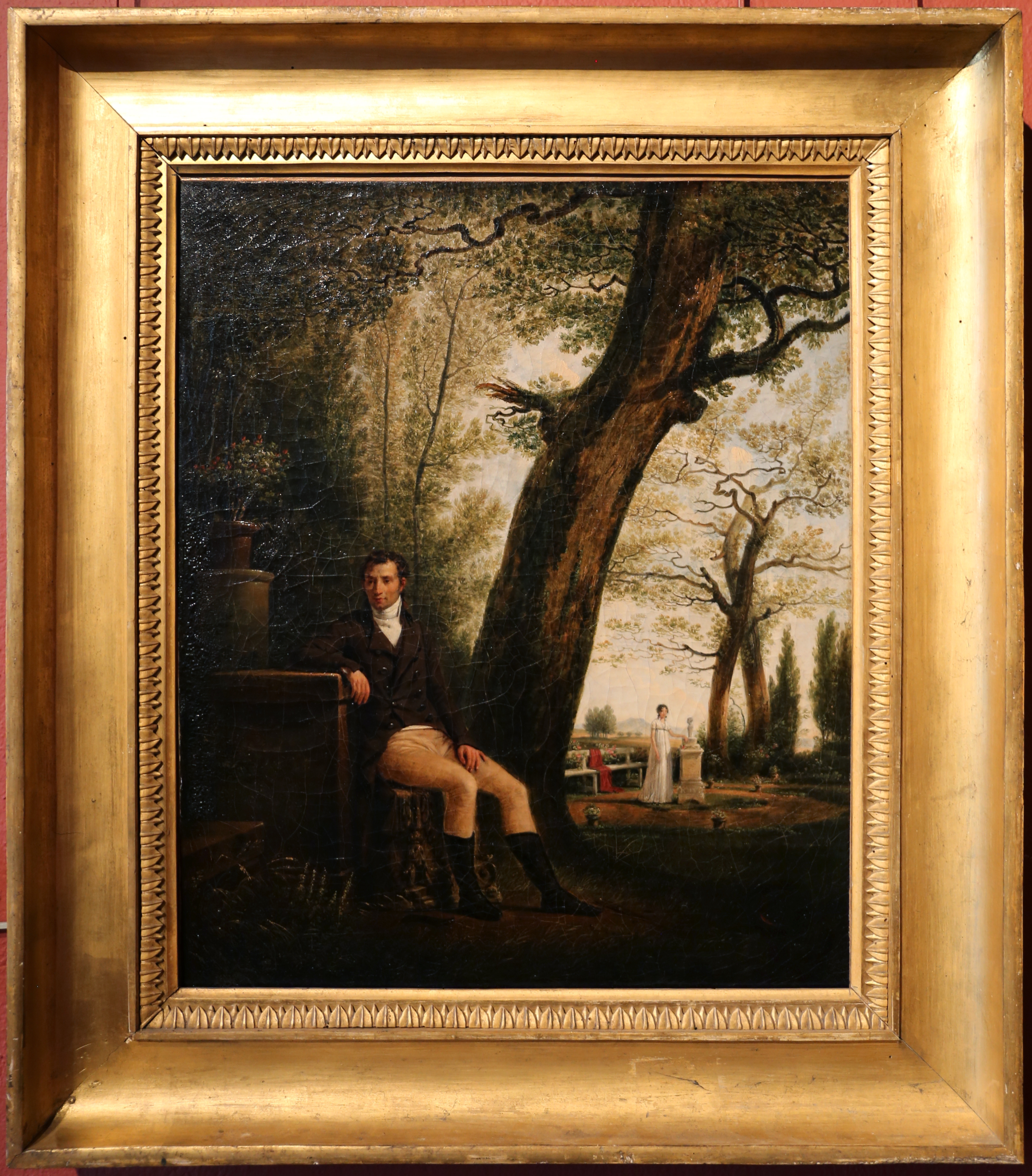
"Portrait of Lucien Bonaparte with his first wife, Christine Boyer, in the background" (1794-1800) by Jacques Sablet (Musée Fesch)

A painter of undoubted originality, his body of work is little known apart from family portraits in which fragile silhouettes stand out against large, pure skies, and Italian scenes with warm colours and sharp contrasts, successful themes of Giandomenico Tiepolo or Goya, such as the "Colin-maillard" (1791), a masterpiece of the genre. Almost all the mythological paintings have disappeared, whereas in his early days, Jacques Sablet represented himself as a history painter in his "Autoportrait dans l'atelier" (around 1779). A contemporary history painting, "Le dix-huit brumaire", was not executed (but a preparatory oil sketch, "La salle des Cinq-Cent à Saint-Cloud le soir du 18 brumaire an VIII", remains in the Musée des Beaux-Arts in Nantes). The genre scenes, not gallant but «bene moratae», so highly esteemed by contemporaries, are mostly lost, were it not for "Les premiers pas de l'enfance" (1789), already mentioned, now in the Collezione Pedriali. Many subjects, and some of the most original, are known only by mention. There were several "Départs pour l’armée" (Departures for the Army), "Banquets champêtres" (Country Banquets) or "Repas de noces" (Wedding Meals), one of which is in the Musée cantonal des Beaux-Arts in Lausanne and was once attributed to Louis Léopold Robert.

Jacques Sablet studies feelings in their subtlety, evokes brightly coloured Italian costumes, plays with light through a portico or is seduced by the Roman countryside on a summer evening. His portraits of mourners by a grave, such as the "Elégie romaine" (1791) or the portraits of Christine Boyer and Lucien Bonaparte (ca. 1798-1800), a poignant double "memento mori", are a high point in the art of evoking melancholy. Emulating Jean-Jacques Rousseau, Jacques Sablet has found the right and true tone, cultivated with fine and lively touches, and without false effects, the art of charming.

== See also ==
- House of Bonaparte
