= Yekaterina Saltykov =

Russian courtier

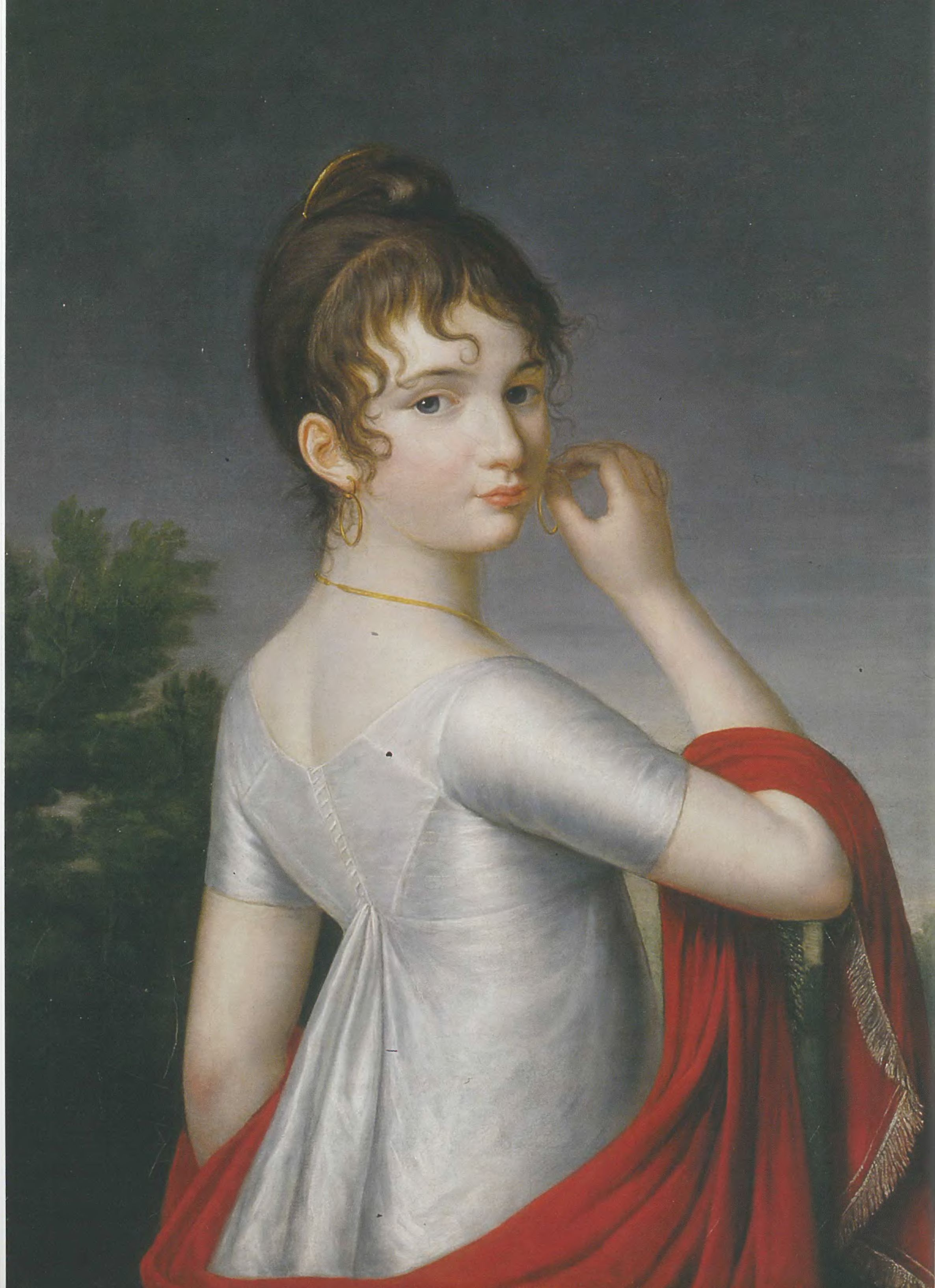
- Born: Princess Ekaterina Vasilyevna Dolgorukova; 21 April 1791; Saint Petersburg, Russian Empire
- Died: 18 January 1863 (aged 71)
- Noble family: Dolgorukov
- Spouse: Count Sergei Nikolaevich Saltykov
- Father: Prince Vasily Vasilyevich Dolgorukov
- Mother: Princess Ekaterina Feodorovna Baryatinskaya
- Occupation: Maid of Honour

Yekaterina Saltykov (21 April 1791 - 18 January 1863), was a Russian courtier. The daughter of Ekaterina Feodorovna Baryatinskaya, she served as lady in waiting to empress Elizabeth Alexeievna (Louise of Baden). She was married to Sergei Nikolayevich Saltykov, albeit unhappily and without issue. She was served as chief lady in waiting of the court of the Tsarevich in 1840-55 and the emperor 1855-63 following his accension. During this time, she exerted considerable influence at the court.
