= Kapiton Pavlov =

Russian painter

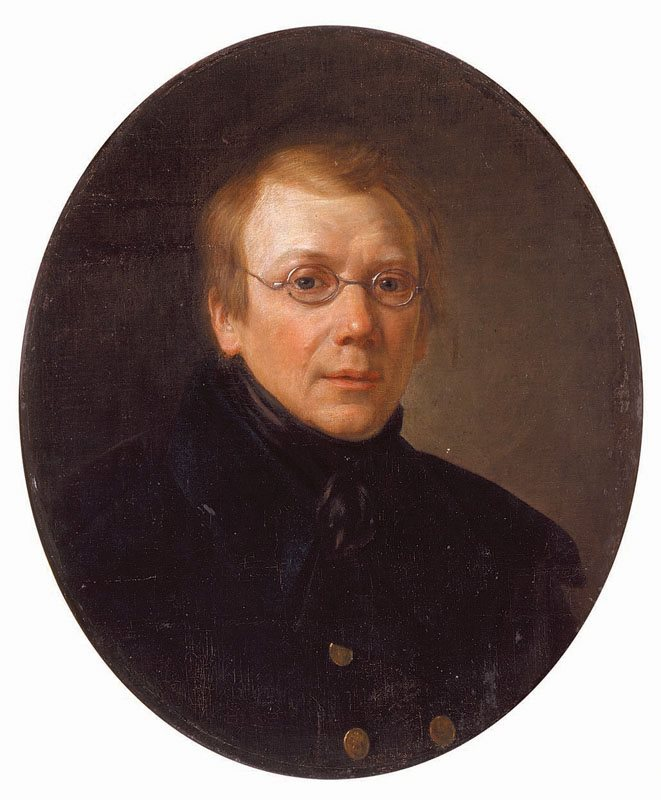

Kapiton Stepanovich Pavlov (1791 – 1 January 1852) was a Russian portrait painter. A native of Reval (now Tallinn), he was the son of a government official. He graduated from the Academy in St. Petersburg in 1815, after which he went to Ukraine; there, he spent thirty years painting. From 1820 until 1829 he taught painting at the gymnasium in Nizhyn. He also taught at Kyiv University from 1839 until 1841.
