= 1735 in art =

Events from the year 1735 in art.

== Events ==
- February 18 – The English ballad opera Flora goes down in recorded history as the first opera of any kind to be produced in North America (in Charleston, South Carolina).
- June 25 – In Great Britain, the Engraving Copyright Act ('Hogarth's Act') takes effect on being given royal assent, the first of a series of British copyright protection laws, to protect original engravings against unauthorized copies.
- William Hogarth's A Rake's Progress series of paintings are published as engraved prints in London.
- The Chandos Mausoleum is constructed for James Brydges, 1st Duke of Chandos in St Lawrence's Church, Whitchurch, north of London, decorated in a classical trompe-l'œil style by Gaetano Brunetti.
- Guillaume Coustou the Younger is awarded the Prix de Rome.

== Paintings ==
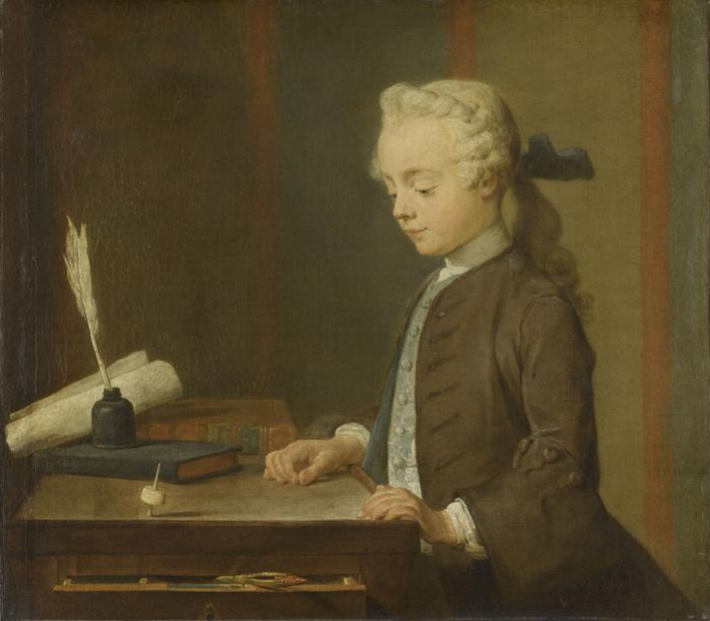
Chardin – Boy with a Top

- Jacopo Amigoni
  - Caroline Wilhelmina of Brandenburg-Ansbach
  - Frederick, Prince of Wales
- Canaletto
  - The Bucintoro Returning to the Molo (1730–1735) (Bowes Museum, Barnard Castle, England)
  - The Feast Day of Saint Roch (1735)
  - The Molo, Venice (approximate date) (Kimbell Art Museum, Fort Worth, Texas)
  - A Regatta on the Grand Canal (1730–1735) (Bowes Museum, Barnard Castle, England)
  - Venice: A Regatta on the Grand Canal (National Gallery, London)
  - View of the Piazzetta San Marco Looking South (approximate date) (Indianapolis Museum of Art)
- Jean-Baptiste-Siméon Chardin
  - Boy building a House of Cards (probable first version; Waddesdon Manor, England)
  - Boy with a Top
  - A Lady Taking Tea
- Agostino Masucci – The Solemnisation of the Marriage of James III and Maria Clementina Sobieska
- Philippe Mercier – Comedians by a Fountain
- Charles-Joseph Natoire – Psyche and Proserpine
- Giovanni Battista Piazzetta – The Assumption of Mary (The Louvre)

== Sculptures ==
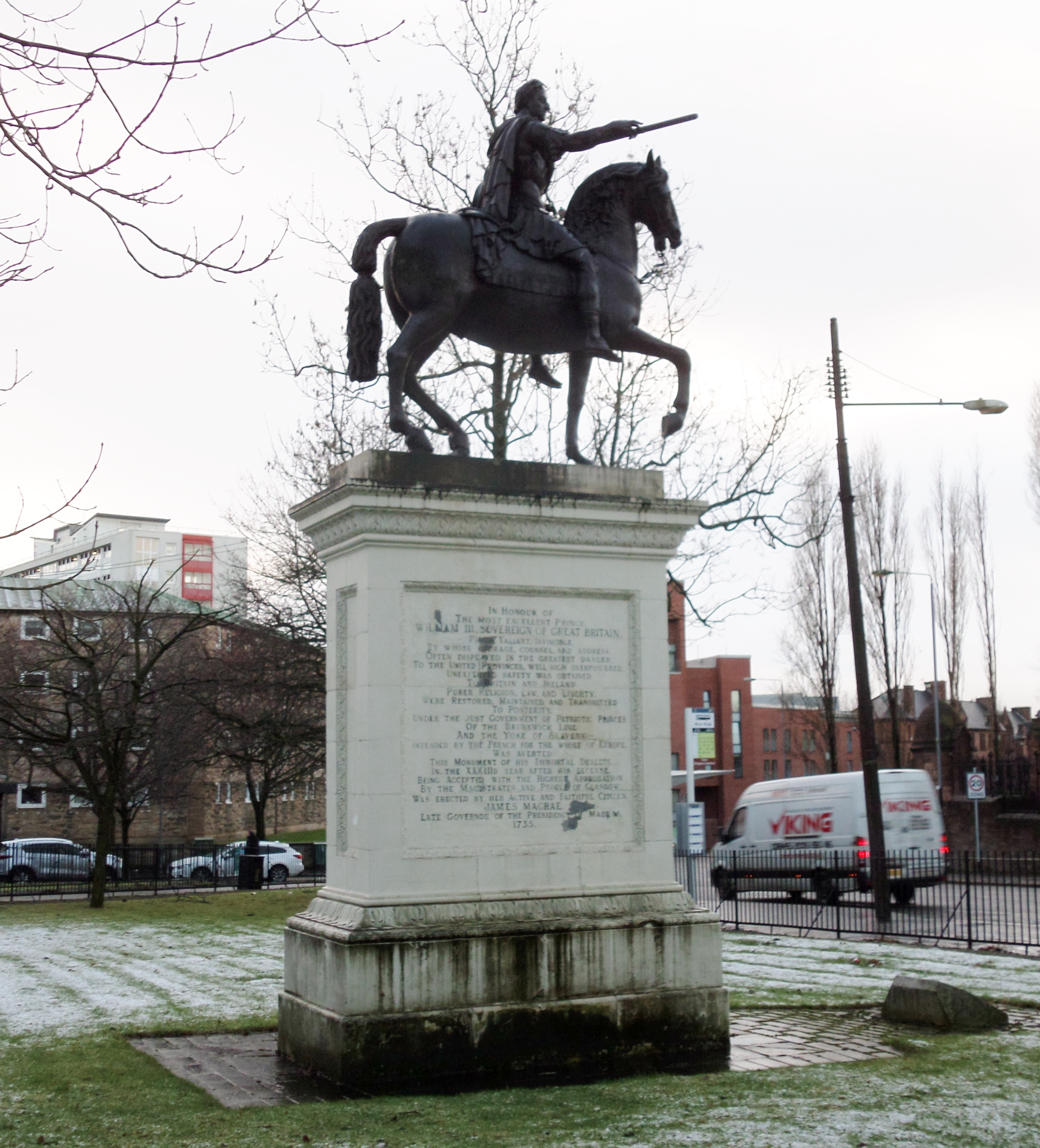
Equestrian statue of William III, Glasgow

- Unknown sculptor - Equestrian statue of William III, Glasgow

== Births ==
- January 18 – Jeremiah Meyer, German-born English miniaturist (died 1789)
- May – Dmitry Levitzky, Russian-Ukrainian portrait painter (died 1822)
- May 8 – Sir Nathaniel Dance-Holland, English portrait painter and later a politician (died 1811)
- June 16 – Nicolas Bernard Lépicié, French painter (died 1784)
- July 10 – Ulrika Pasch, Swedish miniaturist (died 1796)
- October 17 – Franz Xaver Feuchtmayer the Younger, member of the German Feuchtmayer family of Baroque artists associated with the Wessobrunner School (died 1803)
- December 20 – Friedrich August Brand, Austrian painter and engraver of historical subjects and landscapes (died 1806)
- December 29 – Thomas Banks, sculptor (died 1805)
- date unknown
  - Dimitrije Bačević, Serbian icon painter and muralist (died 1770)
  - Samuel Collins, British miniature painter (died 1768)
  - Tilly Kettle, English portrait painter (died 1786)
  - Isoda Koryusai, Japanese printmaker and painter (died 1790)
  - Étienne de La Vallée Poussin, French history painter and creator of interior decorative schemes (died 1802)
  - James Tassie, Scottish engraver (died 1799)
  - Giovanni Volpato, Italian engraver, excavator, dealer in antiquities and manufacturer of biscuit porcelain figurines (died 1803)

== Deaths ==
- January 21 – Abraham Rademaker, Dutch painter and printmaker (born 1677)
- March 4 – Antonio Beduzzi, Austrian-Italian theater engineer, painter, and architect (born 1675)
- July 1 – Jean Ranc, French portrait painter (born 1674)
- July 16 – Cassandra Willoughby, Duchess of Chandos, British historian, travel writer and artist (born 1670)
- December 11 – Antoine Rivalz, official painter to the town of Toulouse (born 1667)
- date unknown
  - Pompeo Aldrovandini, Italian painter (born 1677)
  - Antonio Dardani, Italian painter (born 1677)
  - Nunzio Ferraiuoli, Italian painter (born 1661)
  - Pârvu Mutul, Romanian muralist and church painter (born 1657)
  - Giacomo Antonio Ponsonelli, Italian Rococo sculptor (born 1654)
