= 1677 in art =

Events from the year 1677 in art.

== Events ==
- Mosaics are created in St Mark's Basilica, Venice, from cartoons by Giovanni Antonio Fumiani.

== Paintings ==
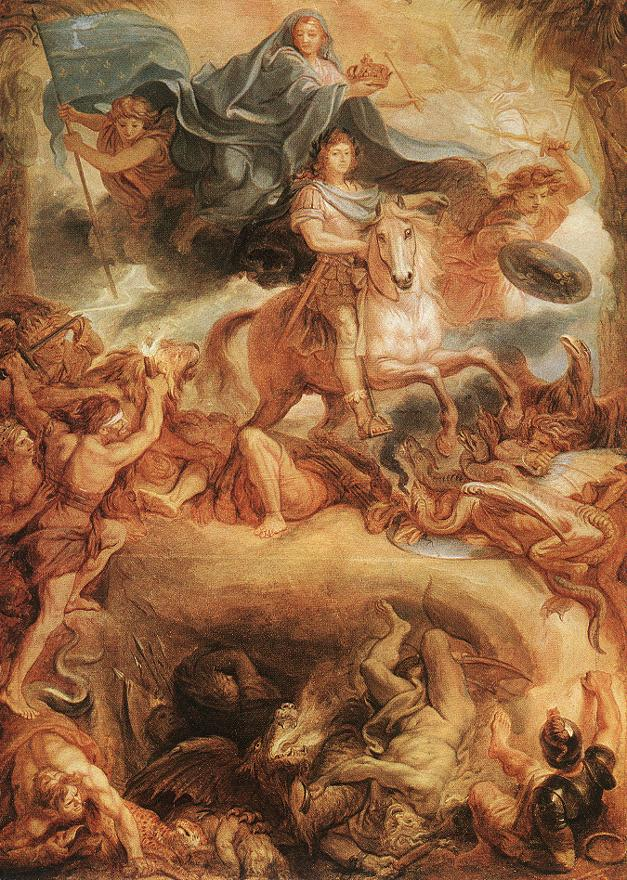
Le Brun – Apotheose of Louis XIV, Budapest Museum of Fine Arts

- Claude Lorrain paints The Voyage of Jacob in his late Roman period.
- Thomas Flatman paints miniature portraits.
- Pietro Giarguzzi - The Holy Trinity crowning the Blessed Virgin Mary (fresco) at San Carlo alle Quattro Fontane.
- Abraham Hondius - The Frozen Thames, a view over the Thames to the old London Bridge during the Little Ice Age.
- Pieter de Hooch - A Musical Party in a Courtyard.
- Charles Le Brun - Apotheose of Louis XIV.
- Jan Siberechts – A View from Richmond Hill

== Births ==
- October 23 – Giuseppe Antonio Petrini, painter (died 1755/1759)
- November 29 – Guillaume Coustou the Elder, French sculptor and academician (died 1746)
- date unknown
  - Pompeo Aldrovandini, Italian painter (died 1735)
  - Lovia Casalina, Italian woman portrait-painter (died 1702)
  - Louis Du Guernier, French engraver (died 1716)
  - Abraham Rademaker, Dutch painter and printmaker (died 1735)
  - Jean Raoux, French painter (died 1734)
- probable
  - Antonio Dardani, Italian painter (died 1735)
  - Gasparo Lopez, Italian painter of flowers (died 1732)

== Deaths ==
- March 16 – Evaristo Baschenis, Italian Baroque painter primarily of still lifes (born 1617)
- March 25 – Wenceslaus Hollar (Václav Hollar), Bohemian-born etcher working in England (born 1607)
- April 20 – Mathieu Le Nain, French painter (born 1607)
- August 28 – Wallerant Vaillant, Flemish painter and mezzotint engraver (born 1623), painted A Young Boy Copying a Painting and engraved Woman Peeling Fruit and A Boy Drawing a Bust of the Emperor Vitellius
- November 9 – Aert van der Neer, Dutch painter (born 1603)
- November 18 - Claude Audran the Elder, French engraver (born 1597)
- date unknown
  - Giacomo Alboresi, Italian painter (born 1632)
  - Giovanni Battista Galestruzzi, Italian painter and etcher (born 1618)
  - Jan Peeters I, Flemish seascape painter (born 1624)
  - Cristoforo Savolini, Italian painter of altarpieces (born 1639)
  - Wang Jian, Chinese landscape painter during the Qing Dynasty (born 1598)
