= Augustus Schutz =

English courtier

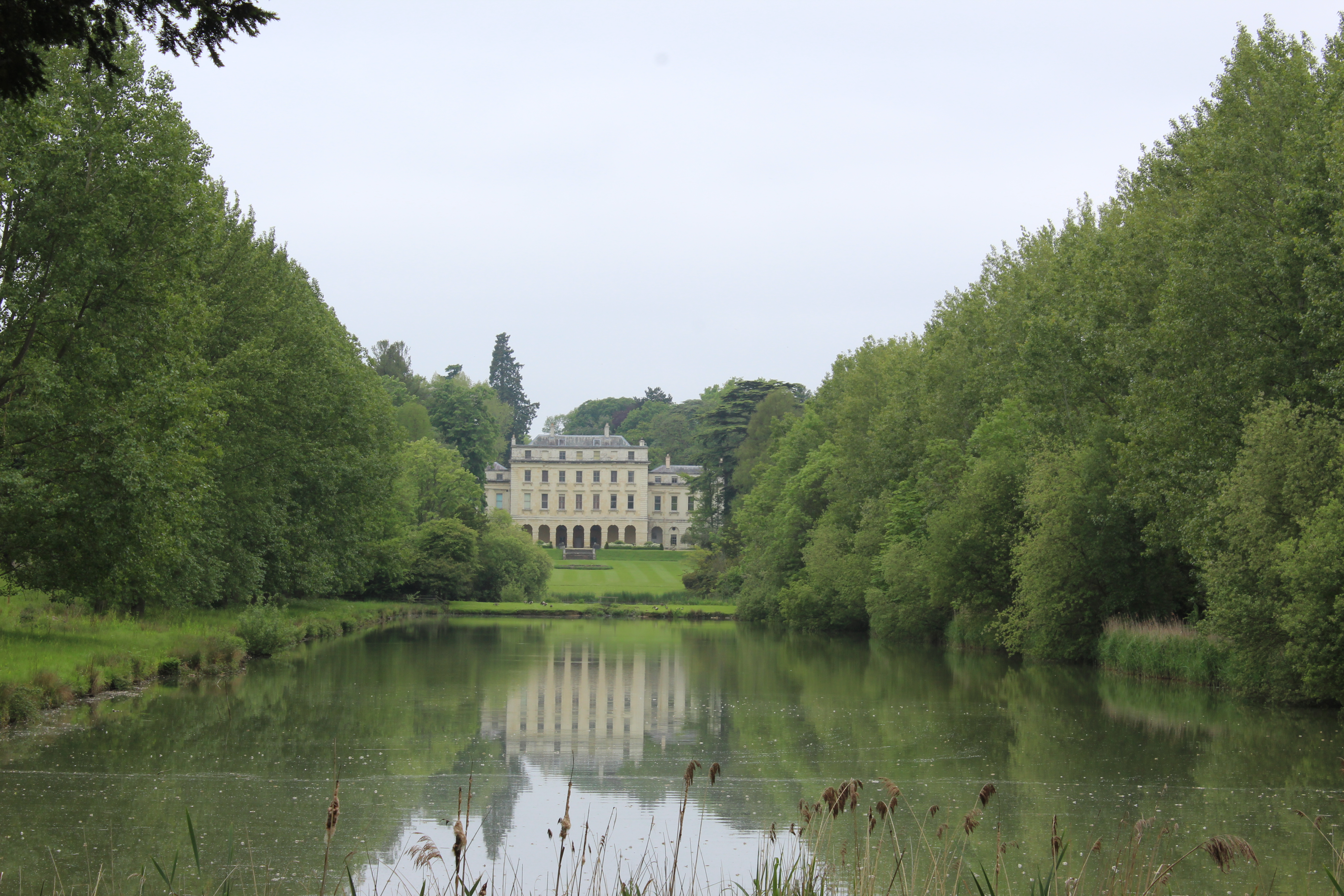
Shotover House, the Schutz family residence

Baron Augustus Schutz (born 1689) was an English courtier.

He was born in England the son of Louis-Justus Sinoldt dit Schutz, a minister-plenipotentiary of the Duke of Hanover at the Court of St James.

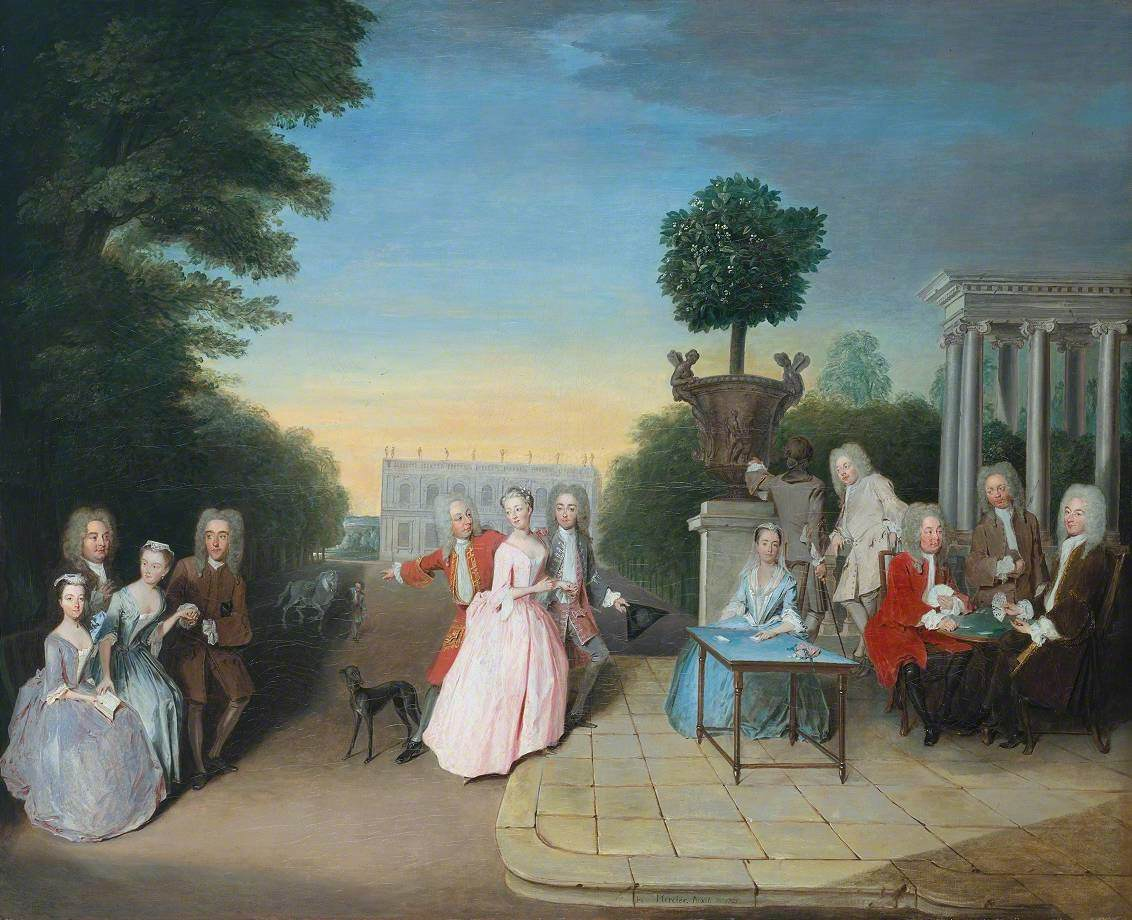
The Schutz Family and Their Friends on a Terrace by Philippe Mercier, 1725

At the age of 16 he went to live in Hanover but returned in 1714 with George I when the latter acceded to the throne of England. He subsequently served George II from 1727 to 1757 as his Master of the Robes and Keeper of the Privy Purse.

He married Penelope Madan and lived at Shotover House in Oxfordshire, which he took over from Lt-Gen. James Tyrell. The Schutzes had 5 sons and 3 daughters; their eldest son George Frederick became a Groom of the Bedchamber to George III.

Court offices
Preceded by Viscount Malpas	Master of the Robes; 1727–1757	Succeeded by Edward Finch
Preceded by Caspar Frederick Henning	Keeper of the Privy Purse; 1727–1757	Succeeded by Edward Finch
