= Charlotte Mercier =

French artist (1738–1762)

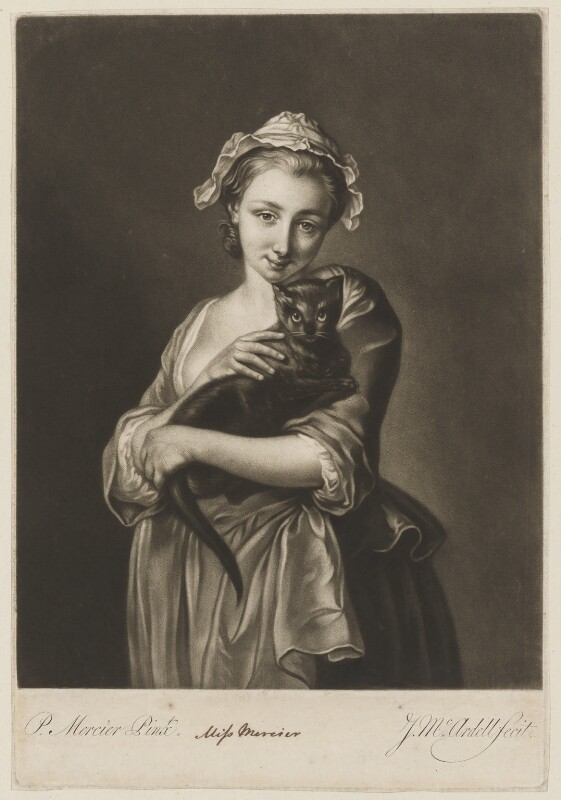

Charlotte Mercier (1738–1762) was a French painter and printmaker active in London.

Mercier, born in London, was the daughter of the artist Philippe Mercier, with whom she studied; a 1738 record of her baptism records her parents' names as Philip and Dorothy. She is said to have turned to a dissolute life after some early success as an artist. An appeal from her mother was read to the Society of Artists in 1761, but she nevertheless died in the St James Workhouse in Westminster the following year. Two portraits, of Madeleine Marie Agathe Renée de la Bigotière de Perchambault and of Olivier-Joseph Le Gonidec, are in the collection of the National Museum of Women in the Arts; both are pastels, and are dated 1757. A mezzotint after her father, Miss Playing with Cup and Ball, is owned by the National Portrait Gallery, London, which also owns a mezzotint portrait of her, after another of her father's works, by James Macardell, published in 1756.

Mercier is sometimes confused with the artist Claude Mercier, also active as a pastellist.
