= The Music Party =

Painting by Philippe Mercier

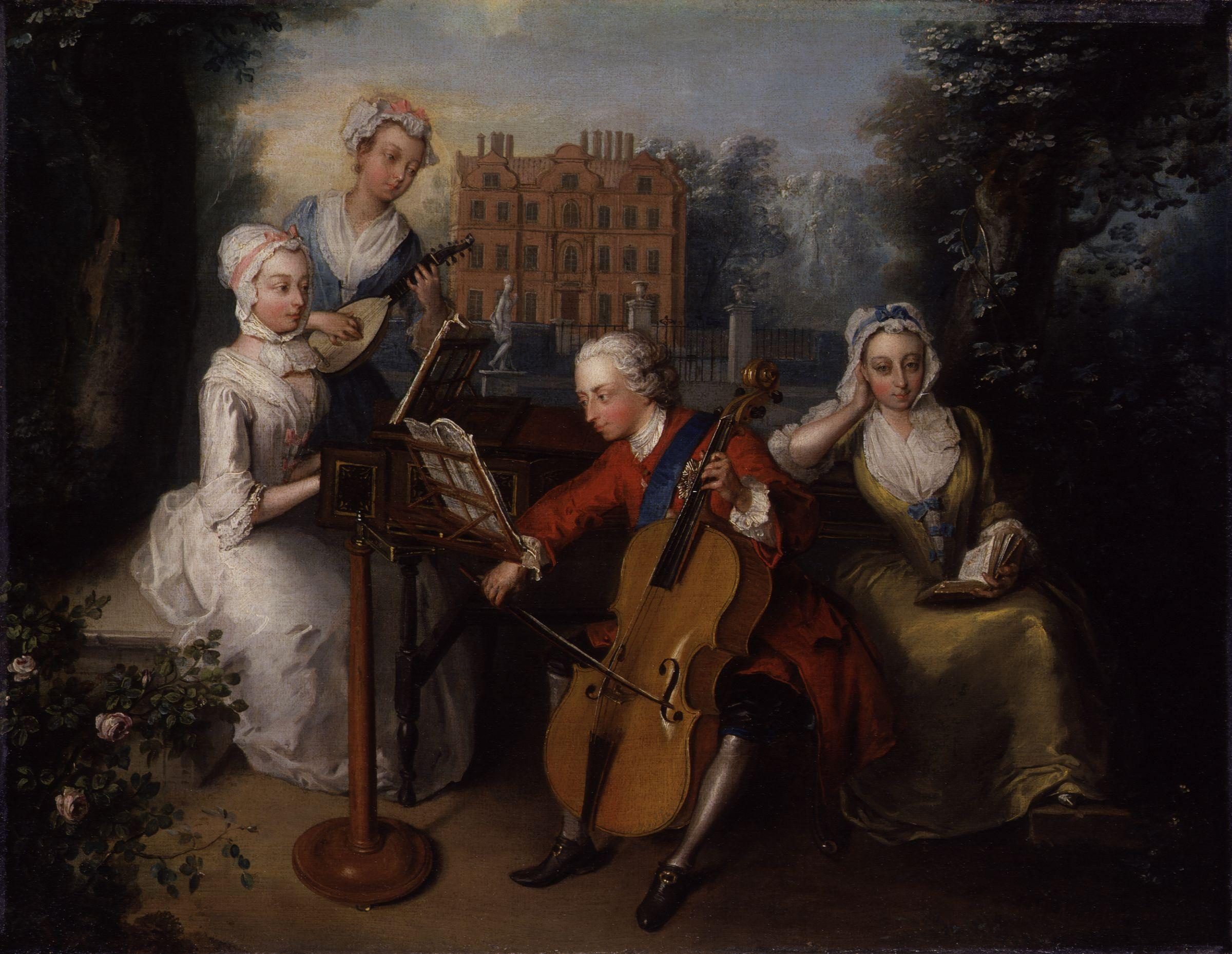
- Artist: Philippe Mercier
- Year: 1733
- Type: Oil on canvas, Conversation piece
- Dimensions: 45.1 cm × 57.8 cm (17.8 in × 22.8 in)
- Location: National Portrait Gallery; London

The Music Party is a 1733 oil painting by the French artist Philippe Mercier. It depicts four members of the British Royal Family, the heir to the throne Frederick, Prince of Wales and his sisters Anne, Caroline and Amelia. A conversation piece, they are shown playing musical instruments while the redbrick Dutch House of Kew Palace can be seen in the background. Mercier was a Berlin-born Huguenot who settled in Britain in 1716 and enjoyed great patronage from Frederick. Today the painting is in the collection of the National Portrait Gallery in London.

A separate version depicting the same group of figures, but shown inside Kew Palace, is in the Royal Collection

== Bibliography ==
- Cumming, Valerie. Royal Dress: The Image and the Reality, 1580 to the Present Day. B.T. Batsford, 1989.
- Millar, Oliver. Frederick, Prince of Wales and His Circle. Gainsborough's House, 1981.
- Rorschach, Kimerly. Frederick, Prince Of Wales as a Patron of the Visual Arts: Princely Patriotism and Political Propaganda. Yale University, 1985.
