= Equestrian statue of William III, Glasgow =

Statue in Scotland

Equestrian statue of William III
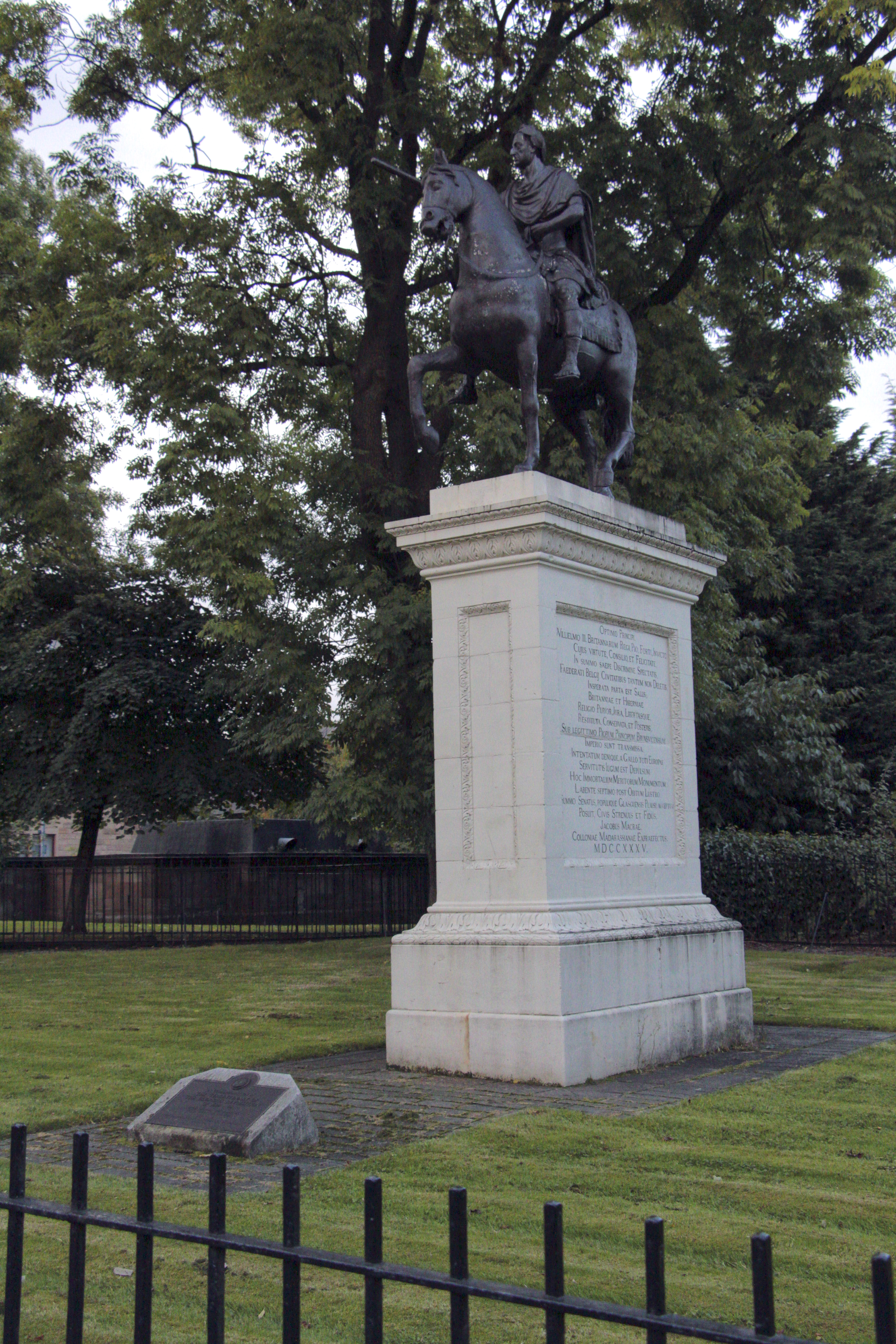
- The statue in 2016
- Artist: Unknown
- Year: 1735
- Medium: Bronze sculpture
- Location: Glasgow; 55°51′42″N 4°14′11″W

The equestrian statue of William III in Cathedral Square, Glasgow, is a 1735 work by an unknown sculptor.

== Description ==
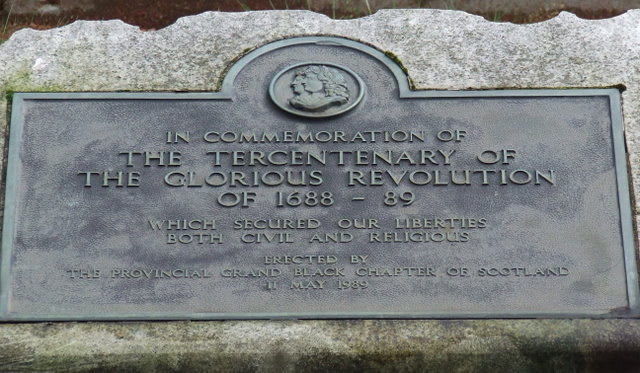
Plaque in front of the statue

The bronze sculpture depicts William III in Roman attire mounted on a horse. The horse's tail is designed to move by means of a ball-and-socket joint to prevent it being broken. In front of the plinth is a plaque that reads "In commemoration of the Tercentenary of the Glorious Revolution of 1688–89". The statue is an A-listed building.

== History ==
The statue was financed by James Macrae in 1735 and erected in front of Tontine Hotel in Trongate. Although the sculptor is unknown, a similar statue of William III by Peter Scheemakers was erected one year earlier in Hull. In 1897, due to the statue obstructing traffic it was moved to a traffic island in front of the new Glasgow Cross railway station. In 1923, the statue was put in storage. In 1926, it was moved to Cathedral Square, where it remains to this day.

In June 2020, following the actions against memorials in Great Britain during the George Floyd protests, the statue was graffitied, William III having been connected to the Royal African Company and Edward Colston.

In May 2021, the statue was damaged after the horse's tail was broken off. The Grand Orange Lodge of Scotland said the vandalism was due the "continued demonisation and stigmatisation of all things Protestant and Unionist" and that it only encourages "vile vandalism and attacks on Glasgow’s historical and architecturally renowned statues."

== See also ==
- 1735 in art
- List of Category A listed buildings in Glasgow
- List of public art in Glasgow
