= The Schutz Family and Their Friends on a Terrace =

Painting by Philippe Mercier

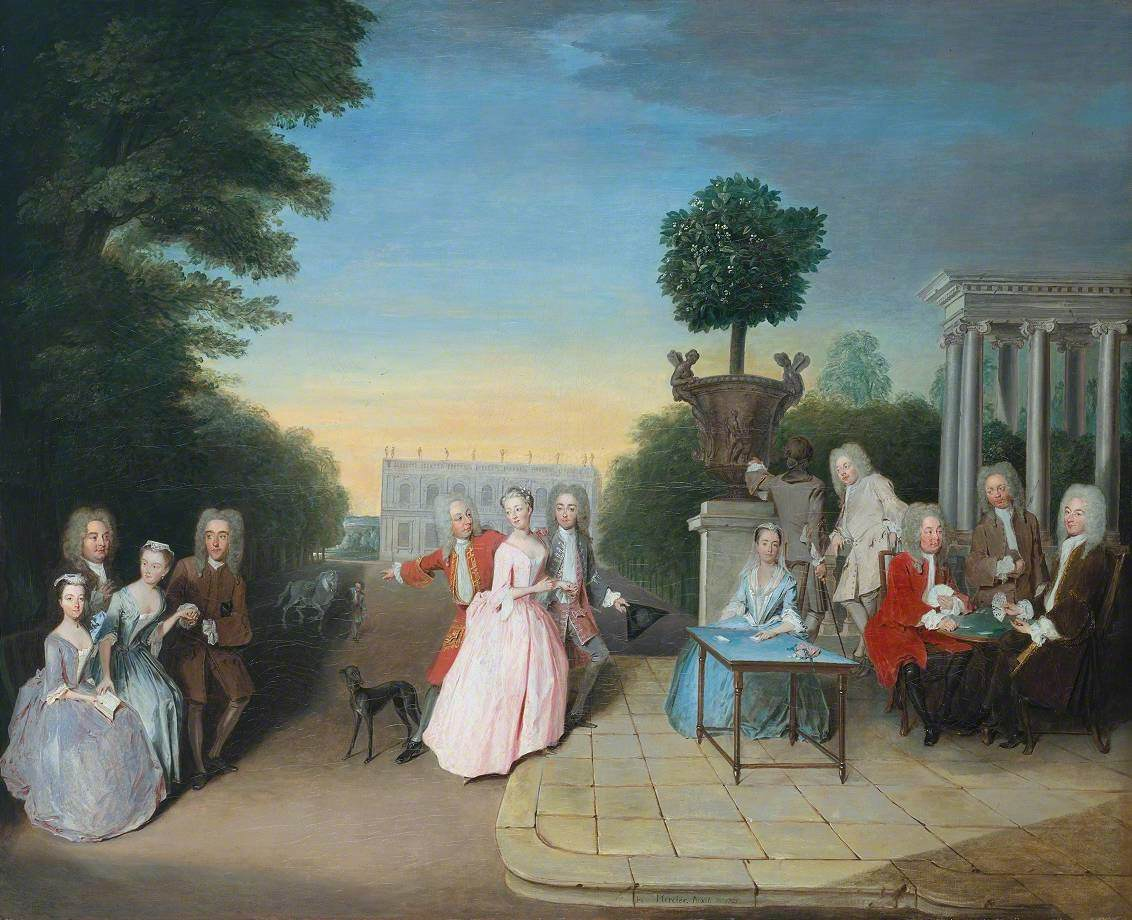
- Artist: Philippe Mercier
- Year: 1725
- Type: Oil on canvas, portrait painting
- Dimensions: 102.2 cm × 125.7 cm (40.2 in × 49.5 in)
- Location: Tate Britain; London

The Schutz Family and Their Friends on a Terrace is a 1725 oil painting by the German artist Philip Mercier. A Conversation piece, it depicts Augustus Schutz and his family. Schutz was from Hanover and the painting has been read as an endorsement of the Hanoverian Succession with its symbology of the White Horse of Hanover and an orange tree representing William III. The Berlin-born Schutz was of Huguenot origin. He settled in London and worked there for most of his career. Today the painting is in the collection of the Tate Britain, having been purchased in 1980.

== Bibliography ==
- Richard, Jessica. The Romance of Gambling in the Eighteenth-Century British Novel. Palgrave Macmillan, 2011.
- Shawe-Taylor, Desmond. The Conversation Piece: Scenes of Fashionable Life. Royal Collection Publications, 2009.
