= St James Workhouse =

Workhouse in London, England

Coordinates: 51.5141°N 0.1374°W

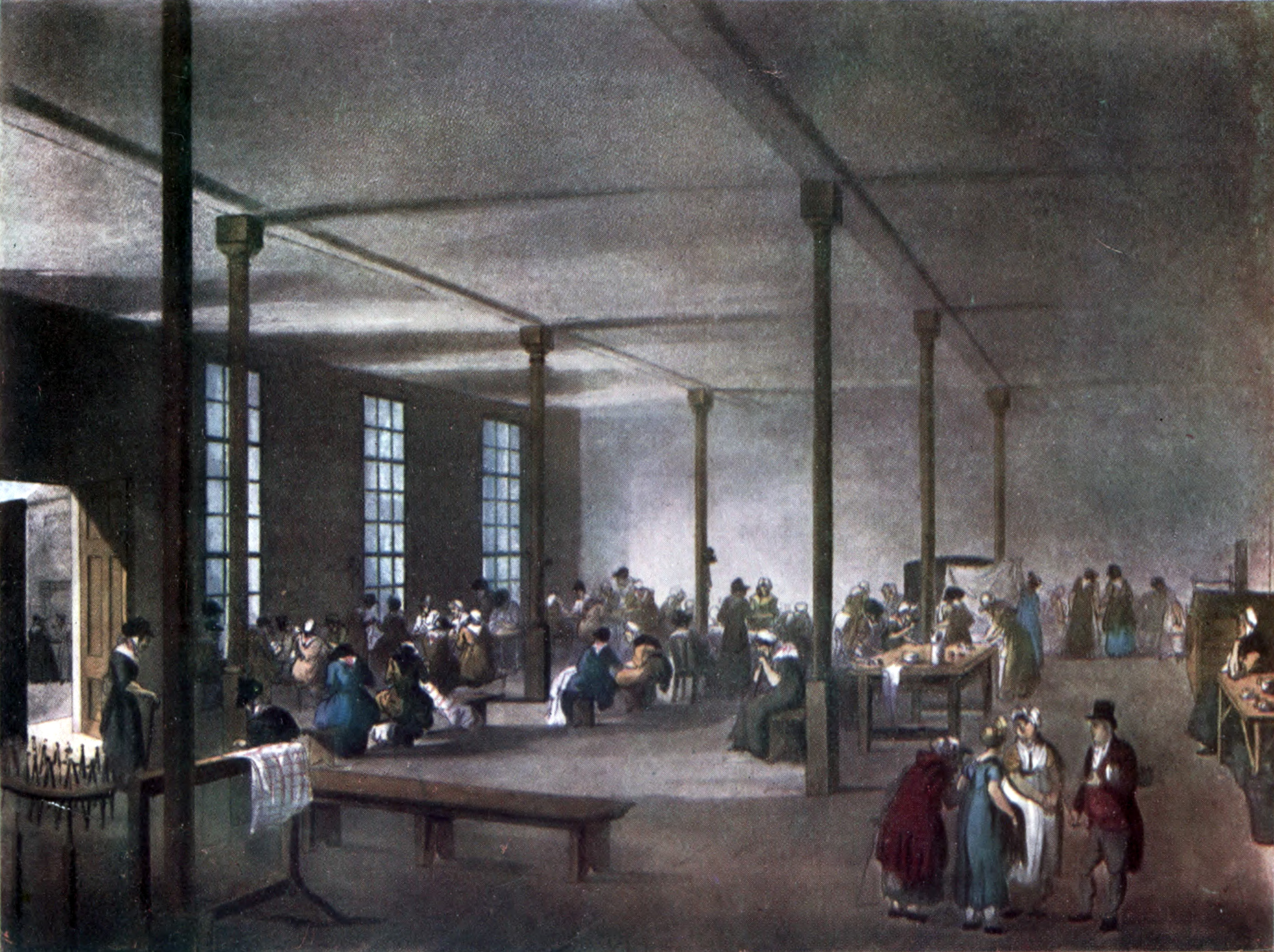
An illustration of the workhouse in the St James parish in Microcosm of London, Volume 3

The St James Workhouse opened in 1725 on Poland Street in the Soho area of London, England, in what was then the parish of Westminster St James, and continued well into the nineteenth century.

It was a parish poorhouse and situated 'in the burying grounds near the pest field'. The institution was designed by carpenter John Ludby to house and employ the able-bodied poor of the parish. A contemporary 1731 report, published in the 1732 edition of An Account of Several Workhouses, provided a detailed account of the facility's architecture, population, labour practices and educational routines.

== Architecture and Layout ==
According to the September 1731 account the facility was constructed as a 'new spacious Brickhouse'. To maintain segregation among its residents, the interior was divided into eight wards:

- Four wards for women
- Two wards for men
- One ward for boys
- One ward for girls

== Demographics ==
At the time of the 1731 report, the workhouse housed 302 residents. Roughly 80 of these inmates, described in the text as 'about fourscore', were children.

== Labour and Daily Operations ==
In accordance with early 18th Century Poor Law practices, all residents who were physically capable were required to contribute to the workhouse's self-sufficiency and textile production. Labour was divided by age and gender.

- Spinning and Weaving: Able-bodied inmates were tasked with "spinning jersey, Mopp, yarn and flax". The resulting jersey and flax threads were woven directly on-site 'in the House by Weavers belonging to the family' (the institutional family).

Higginbotham conjectured that the infirmary at St James Workhouse was the one referred to in the American song "St. James Infirmary Blues", on the basis that that song dates from 'at least the early 19th century'. The song's origins, as the lament of a rake brought low by general disease, match the demographics of inmates who sought medical treatment in workhouses during the period.

== Various ==
Inhabitants included the painter Charlotte Mercier who was the daughter of the German painter and etcher Philippe Mercier. She died aged 23 at St James Workhouse after 'turning to a life of dissolution' on 21 February 1762. She died two years after her father.

The site of the workhouse is now the Q Park parking garage, occupying the space between Poland Street and Marshall Street.
