= Comedians by a Fountain =

Painting by Philippe Mercier

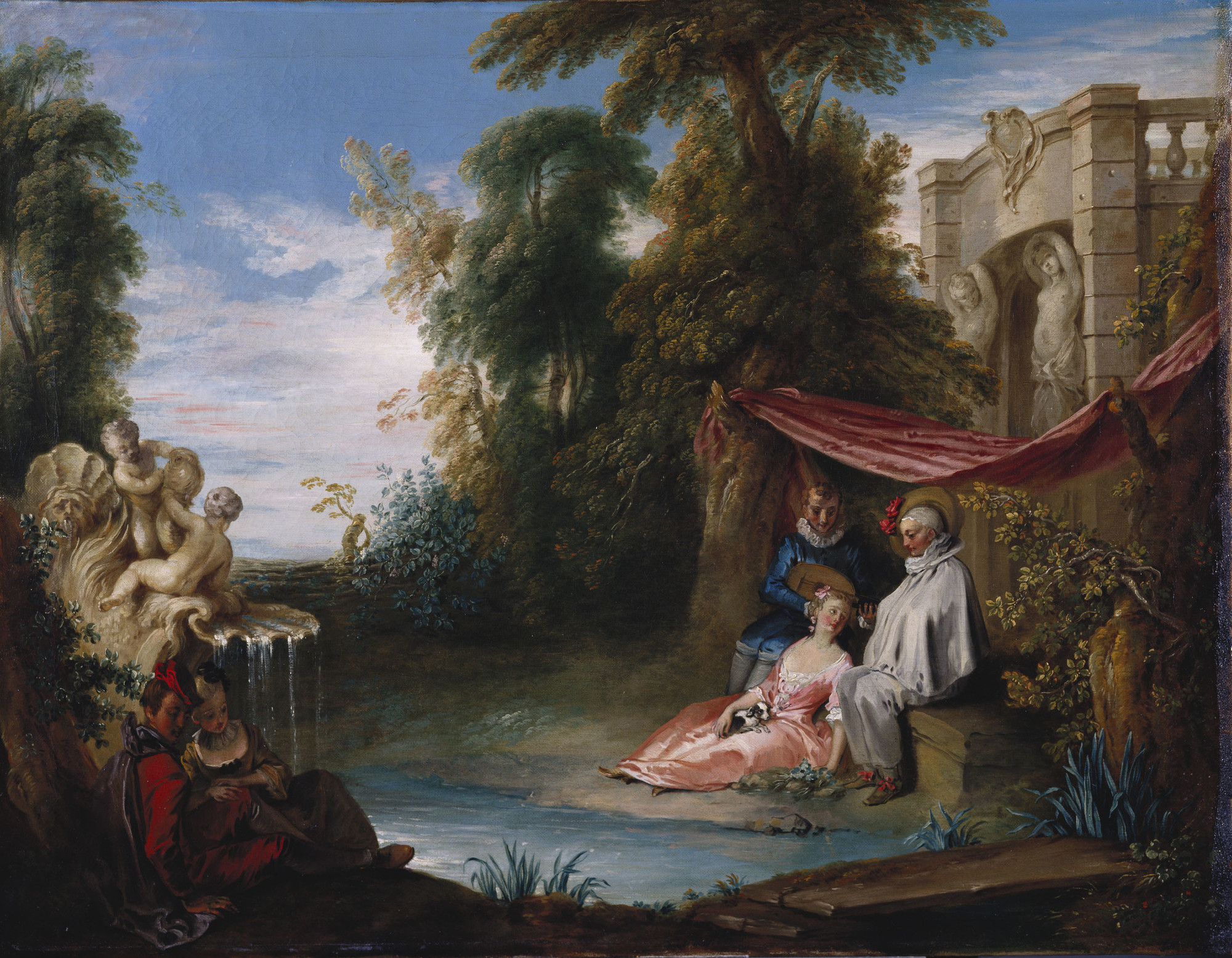
- Artist: Philippe Mercier
- Year: c.1735
- Type: Oil on canvas, Fête galante
- Dimensions: 71.3 cm × 91.8 cm (28.1 in × 36.1 in)
- Location: Royal Collection

Comedians by a Fountain is a c.1735 oil painting by the artist Philippe Mercier. A Fête galante, it depicts figures from the Comedia dell'arte in a garden setting. It is strongly reminiscent of the work of Antoine Watteau.

The Berlin-born son of Huguenot parentage, Mercier settled in Britain and enjoyed success during the early Georgian era. He was appointed official in painter to Frederick, Prince of Wales. The painting was recorded as hanging at Kensington Palace in 1818 and remains in the Royal Collection today.

== Bibliography ==
- Ingamells, John. Philip Mercier 1689-1760: An Exhibition of Paintings and Engravings. Paul Mellon Foundation for British Art, 1969.
- Millar, Oliver. The Tudor, Stuart and Early Georgian Pictures in the Collection of Her Majesty the Queen. Phaidon Press, 1963.
- Rorschach, Kimerly. Frederick, Prince Of Wales as a Patron of the Visual Arts: Princely Patriotism and Political Propaganda. Yale University, 1985.
