= Abraham Rademaker =

Dutch painter

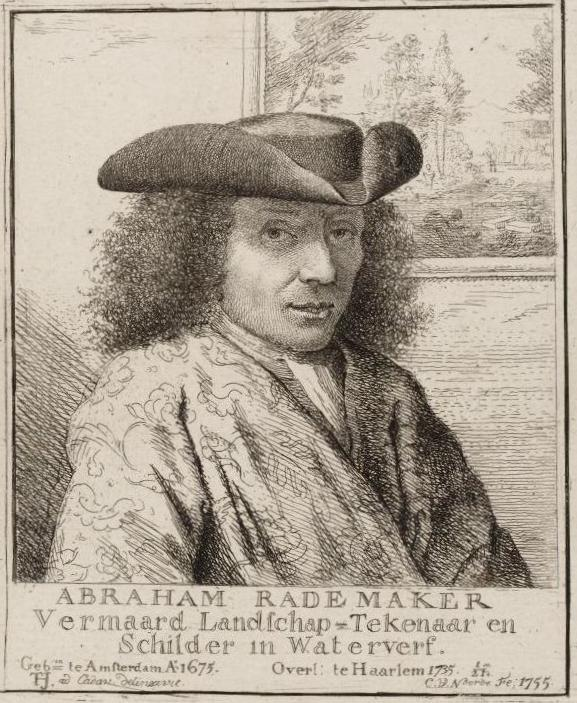
Engraved portrait of Abraham Rademaker by Cornelis van Noorde after a drawing by Tako Hajo Jelgersma

Abraham Rademaker (1677 – 21 January 1735) was an 18th-century painter and printmaker from the Dutch Republic.

== Biography ==
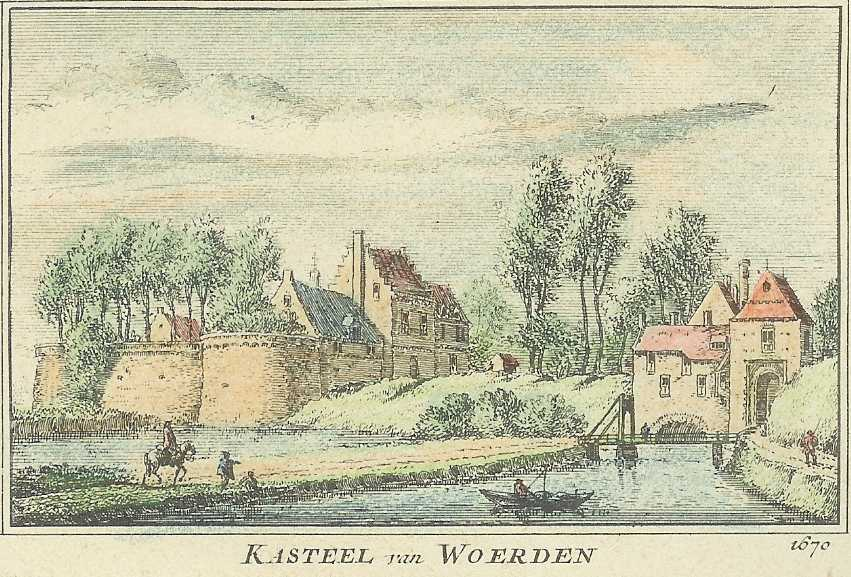
The castle of Woerden, in Rademaker's Nederlandsche Outheeden en Gezigten

Rademaker was born in Lisse. According to the RKD he was a versatile artist who painted Italianate landscapes, but is known mostly for his many cityscapes and drawings of buildings that were made into print. The following list of illustrated publications contain his prints: He died in Haarlem, aged about 57.

- Corte bescrijvinghe mitsgaders hantvesten, privilegien, constumen ende ordonnantien vanden Lande van Zuyt-Hollandt, by Jacob van der Eyk
- Kabinet van Nederlandsche en Kleefsche oudheden, 1792–1803, by Mattheus Brouërius van Nidek; Isaak Le Long; J.H. Reisig
- Spiegel van Amsterdams zomervreugd, op de dorpen Amstelveen, Slooten, en den Overtoom, vertonende deszelfs kerken, herenhuizen, lustplaatssen, lanen, wegen, vaarten, enz... (Published in French as Miroir des delices dans la belle saion d'Amsterdam, Vers les Villages d'Amstelveen, Slooten & de la Chaussee), 1728, by Abraham Rademaker
- Kabinet van Nederlandsche outheden en gezichten, by Abraham Rademaker
- Kabinet van Nederlandsche en Kleefsche oudheden, 1770–1771, Mattheus Brouërius van Nidek; Isaak Le Long
- De Vechtstroom van Utrecht tot Muiden, verheerlijkt door honderd gezichten van steden, dorpen, vestingen, adelijke gestigten, lustplaatzen en waranden, by Abraham Rademaker
