= Philippe Mercier =

Painter (1689–1760)

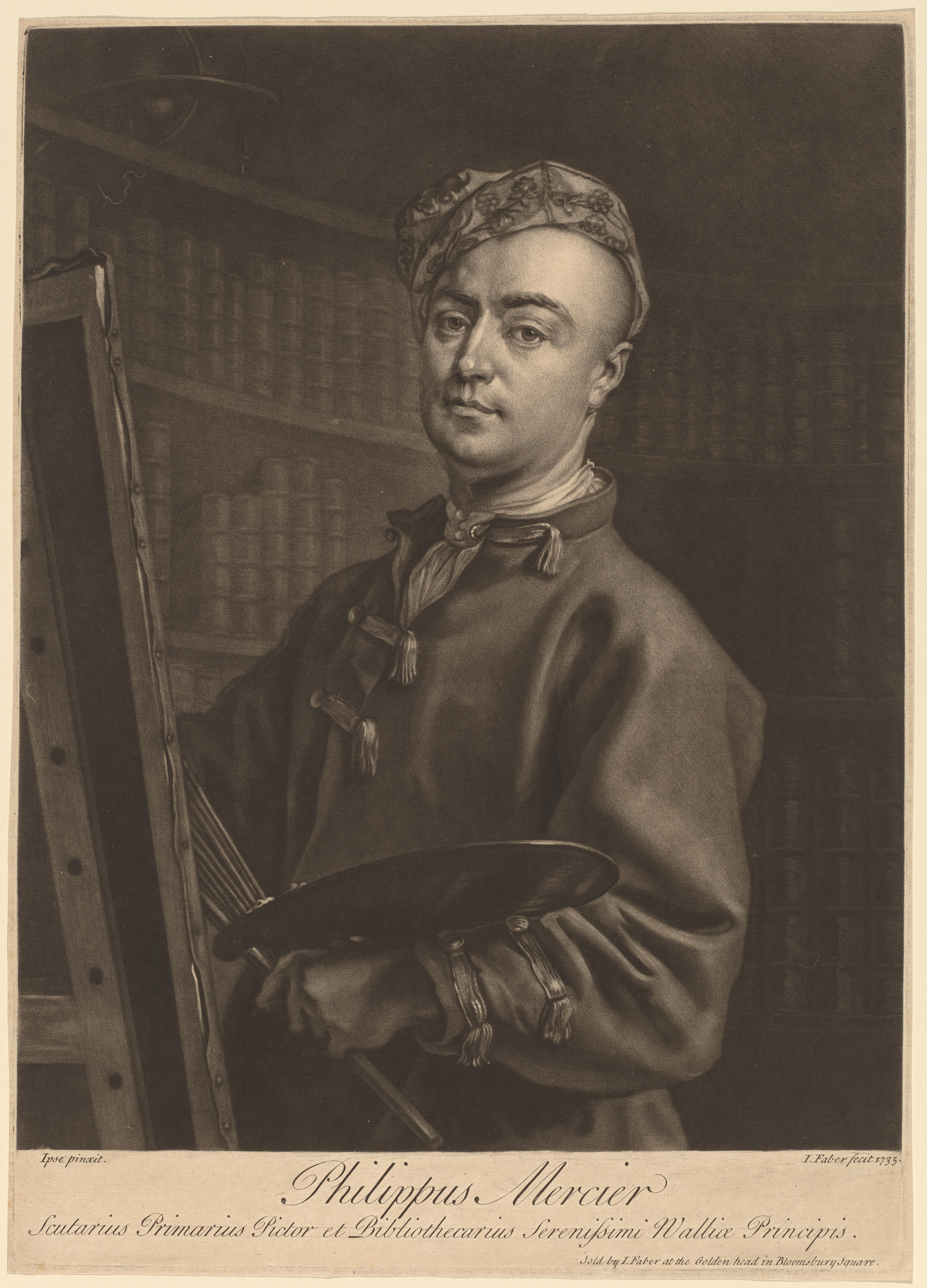
- John Faber the Younger, Philip Mercier, 1735, mezzotint after Mercier's untraced self-portrait; National Gallery of Art, Washington, D.C.
- Born: 1689; Berlin, Brandenburg-Prussia
- Died: 18 July 1760 (aged 70–71); London, Kingdom of Great Britain
- Education: Antoine Pesne
- Known for: Painting and etching
- Movement: Rococo
- Patrons: Frederick, Prince of Wales

Philippe Mercier (also spelled Philip Mercier; 1689 – 18 July 1760) was an artist of French Huguenot descent from the German realm of Brandenburg-Prussia (later Kingdom of Prussia), usually defined to French school. Active in England for most of his working life, Mercier is considered one of the first practitioners of the Rococo style, and is credited with influencing a new generation of 18th-century English artists.

== Life ==
Mercier was born c. 1689–1691 in Berlin, the son of Pierre Mercier (died 1729, Dresden), a Huguenot tapestry-worker. He studied painting at the Akademie der Wissenschaften of Berlin and later under Antoine Pesne, who had arrived in Berlin in 1710. Later, he travelled in Italy and France before arriving in London—"recommended by the Court at Hannover"—probably in 1716. He married in London in 1719 and lived in Leicester Fields.

He was appointed principal painter and librarian to the Prince and Princess of Wales at their independent establishment in Leicester Fields, and while he was in favour he painted various portraits of royalty, and no doubt many of the nobility and gentry. Of the royal portraits, those of the Prince of Wales and of his three sisters, painted in 1728, were all engraved in mezzotint by John Simon, and that of the three elder children of the Prince of Wales by John Faber the Younger in 1744. This last (entitled Playing Soldiers) was a typical piece of Mercier's composition, the children being made the subject of a spirited, if somewhat childish, allegory in their game of play. Prince George is represented with a firelock on his shoulder, teaching a dog his drill, while his little brother and sister are equally occupied in a scene that is aptly used to point a patriotic moral embodied in some verses subjoined to the plate, of which the concluding couplet is as follows:

Illustrious Isle where either sex displays
Such early omens of their future praise!

In 1733, Mercier painted a Portrait of 'Frederick, Prince of Wales, playing a violoncello, and his Sisters'. National Portrait Gallery, London. There is an alternative version of the painting in the Royal Collection. In the painting 'The Sense of Hearing', 1744, women are playing violin, violoncello, harpsichord, and flute in the Yale Center for British Art.

Mercier lost favour at Court and was replaced as principal painter to Frederick Prince of Wales by John Ellys on 7 October 1736. He 'went into the country' in 1736/7 and took rooms in Covent Garden, London. In 1739 he relocated to York, where he focused on 'fancy' pictures concerned with domestic virtue and also practised portrait painting for over ten years, before returning to London in July 1751. In 1752, Mercier went to Portugal at the request of several English merchants along with his family. He did not long remain there, however, but came back to London, where he died in 1760.

John Faber the Younger also engraved six plates of "Rural Life" after Mercier, and several other subjects of his have survived him.

In August 2016, Mercier's painting Portrait of a Lady (1744) was one of the subjects for episode 19 in the 5th series of the BBC Television series Fake or Fortune?

Mercier's daughter Charlotte was also an artist in her early life, before turning to a life of dissolution and dying in the St James Workhouse two years after her father's death.

== Gallery ==
Selected works by Philippe Mercier
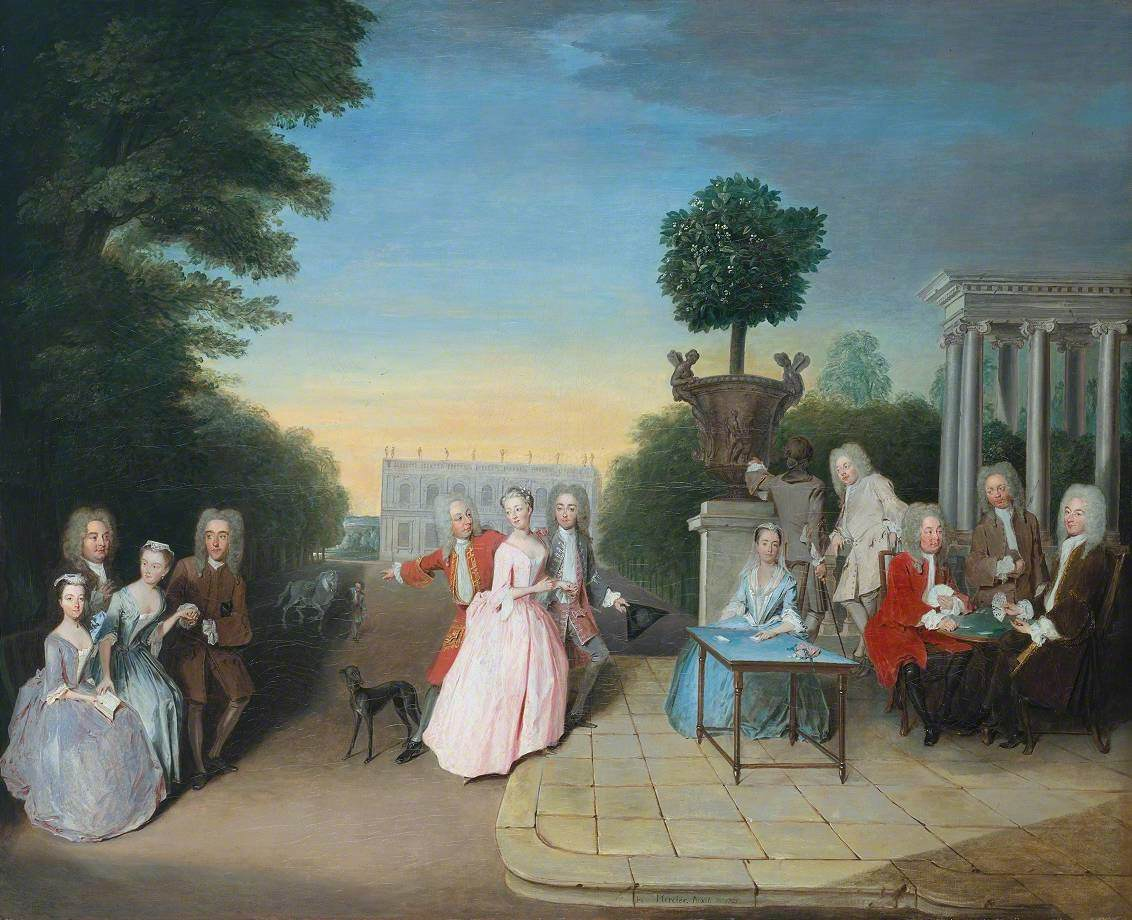
The Schutz Family and Their Friends on a Terrace, 1725, Tate Britain, London

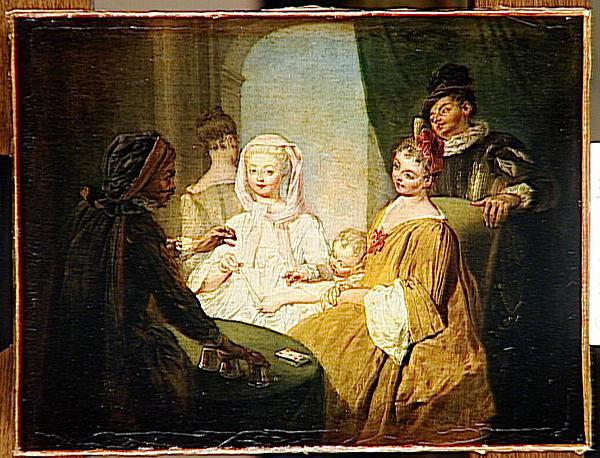
The Conjurer, c. 1725–1730, Louvre, Paris

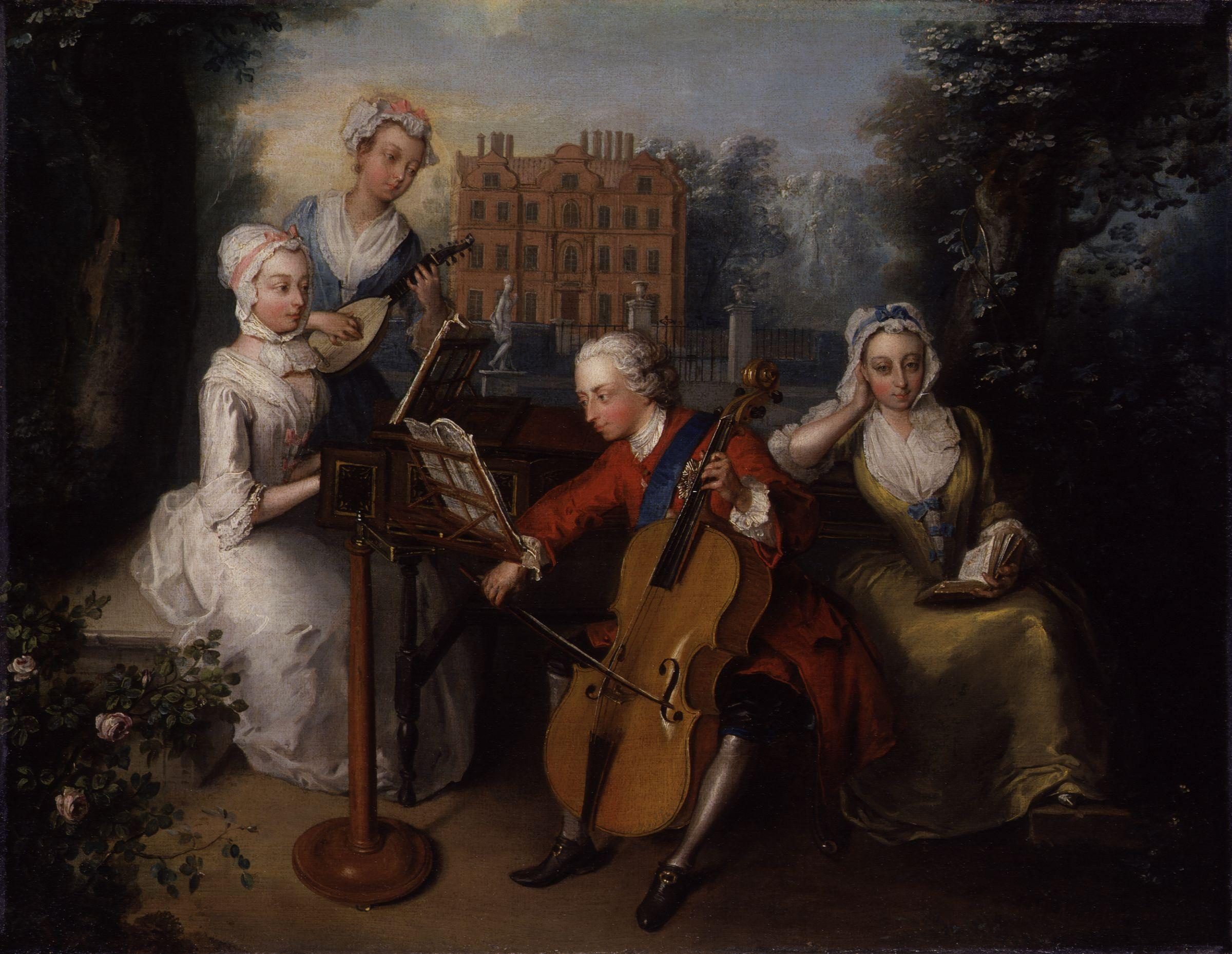
The Music Party, 1733, National Portrait Gallery, London

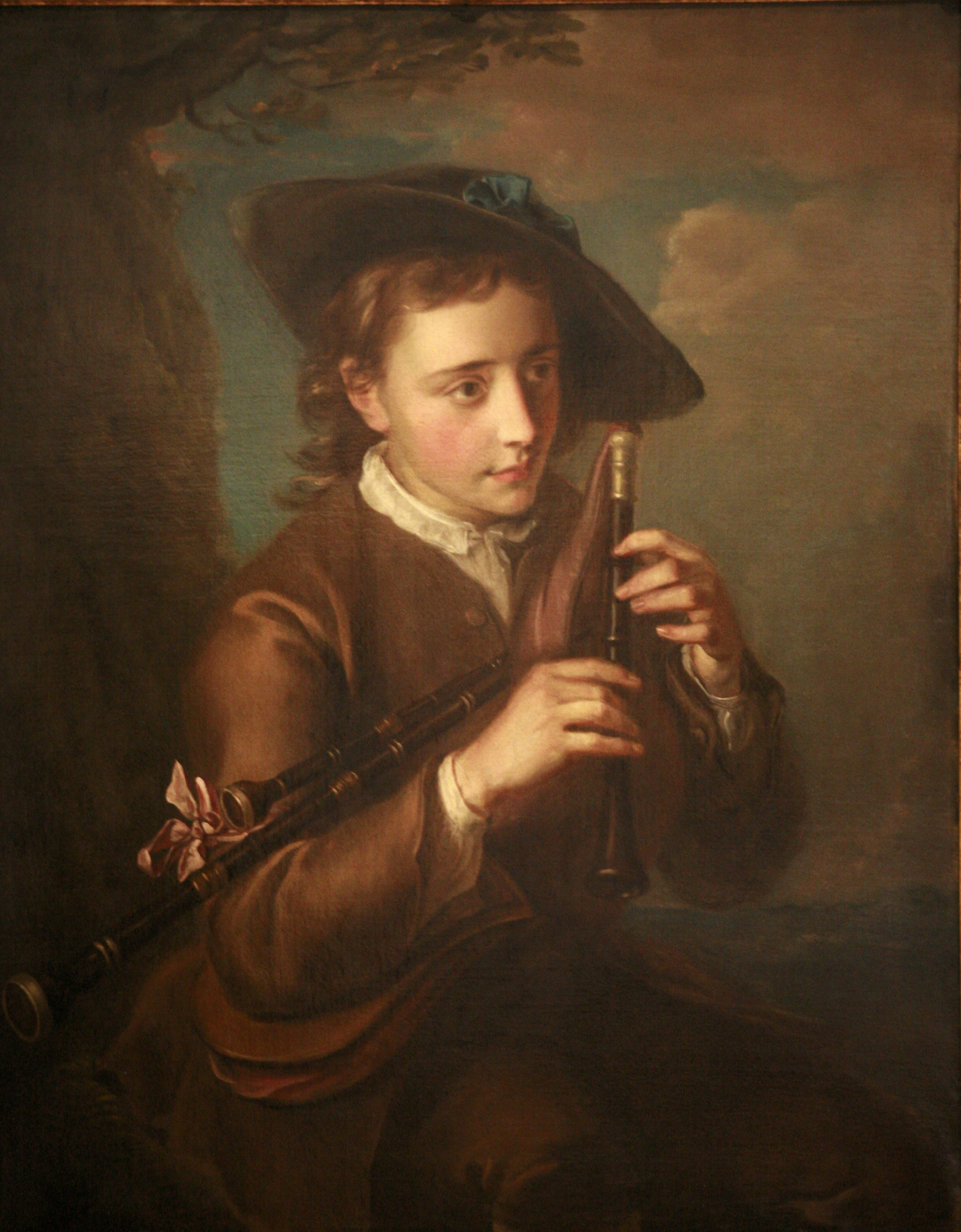
Bagpipe Player, 1740, Musée des Beaux-Arts de Strasbourg

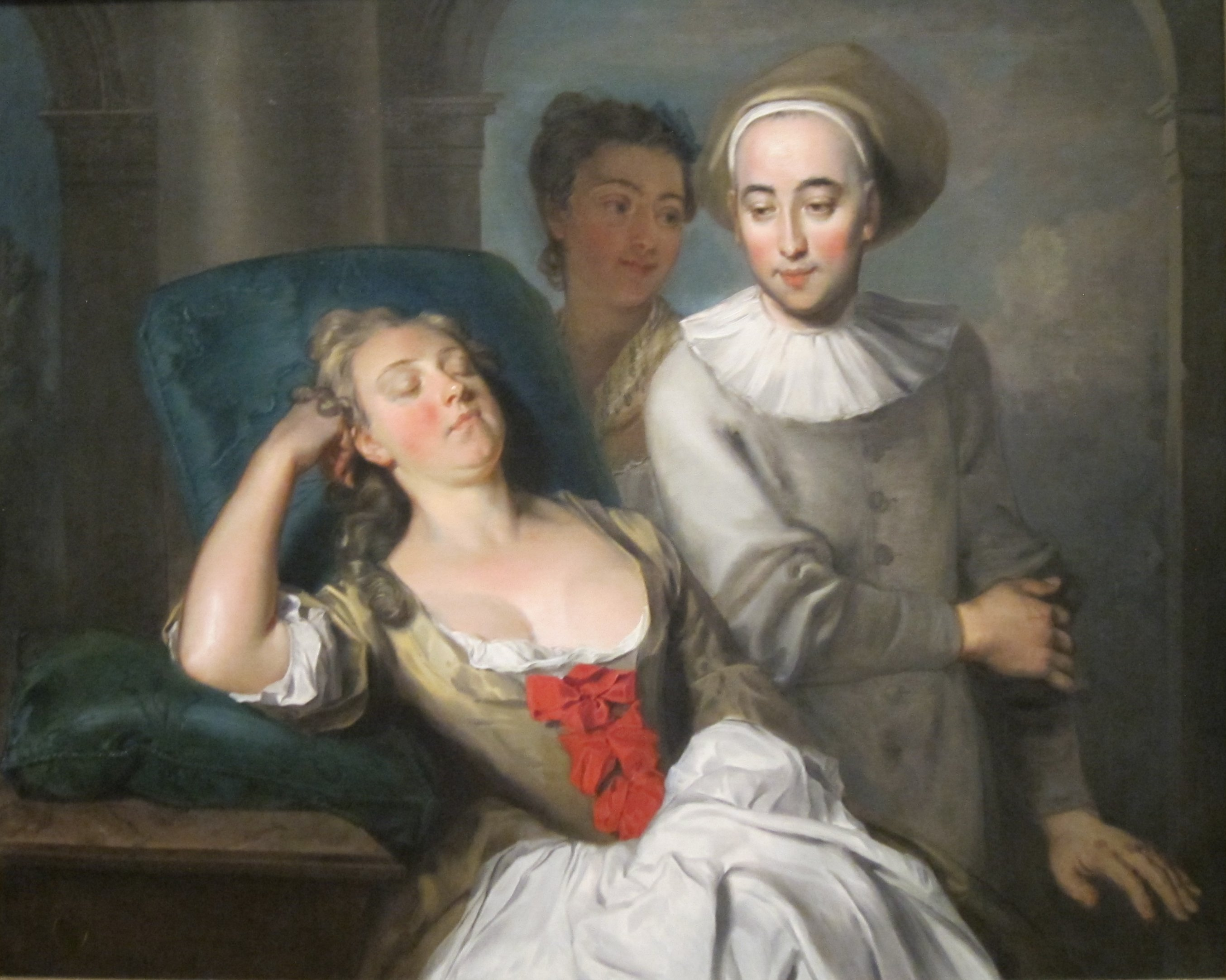
The Italian Comedians, ca. 1735–1740, Cincinnati Art Museum

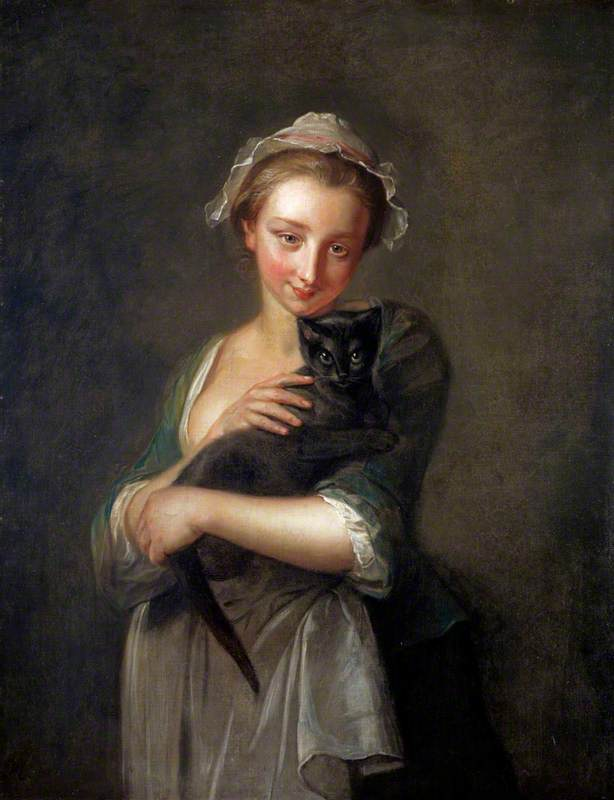
A Girl Holding a Cat, ca. 1750, National Galleries of Scotland, Edinburgh

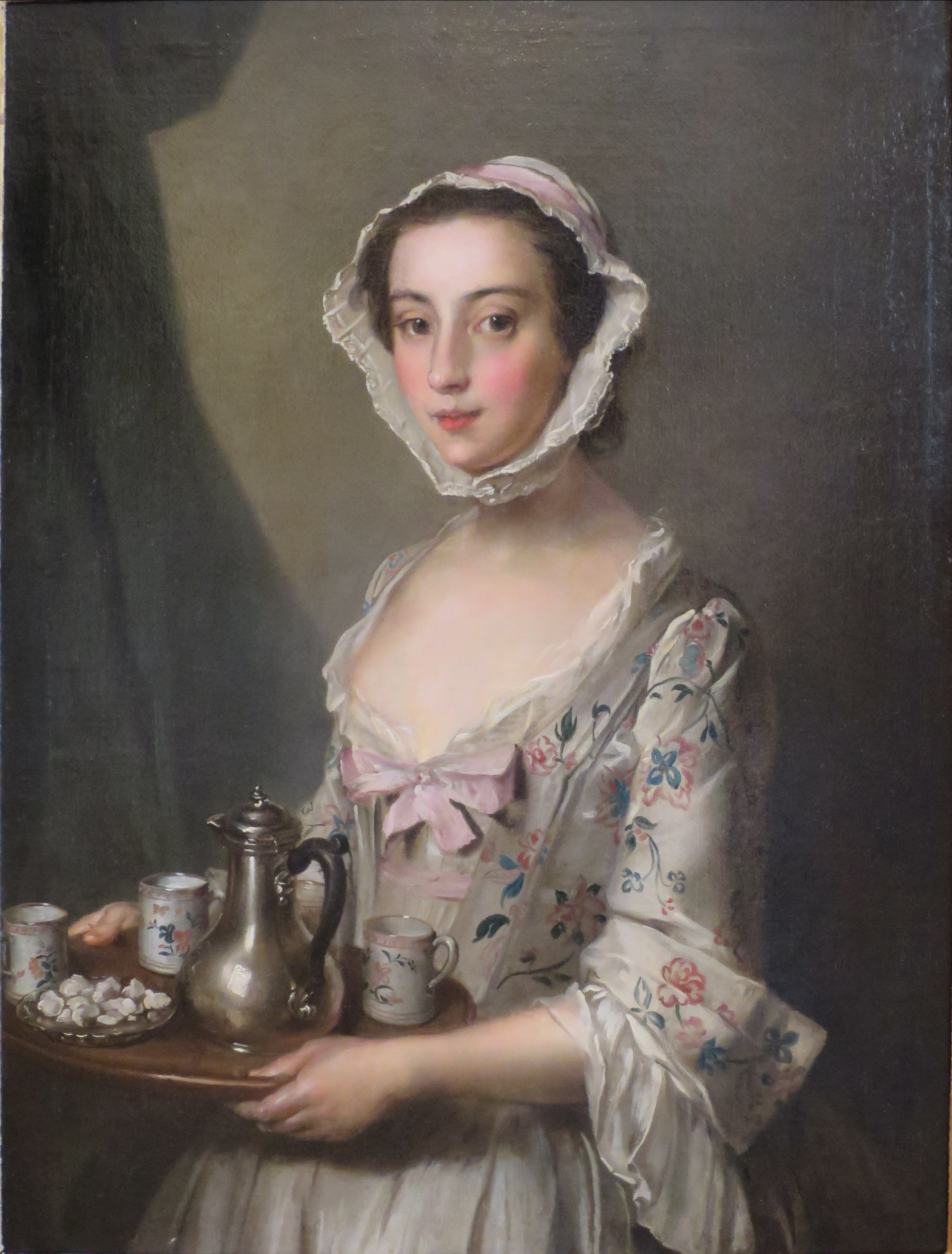
Girl with a Tray, late 1740s, Hermitage Museum, Saint Petersburg

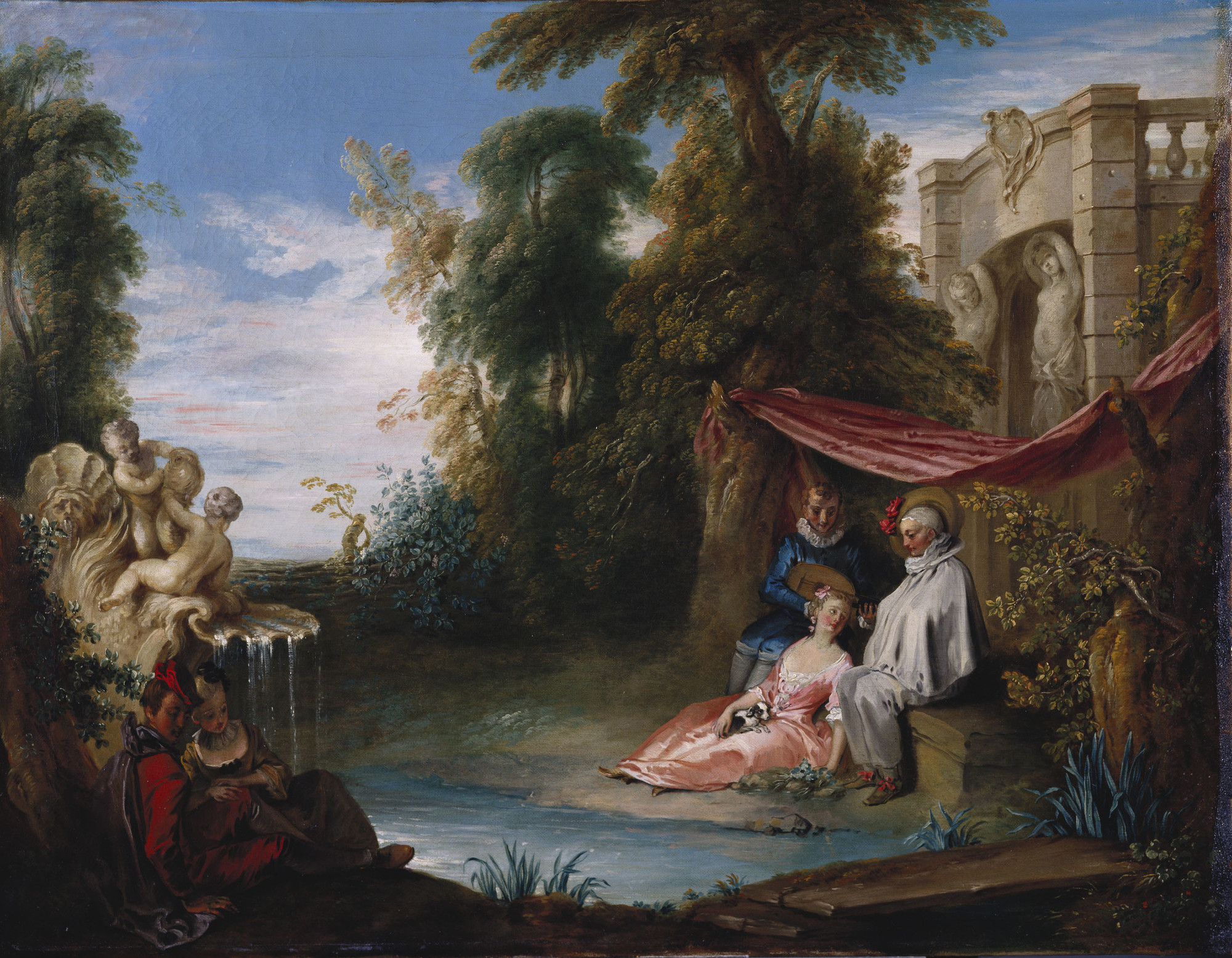
Comedians by a Fountain, ca. 1735, Royal Collection

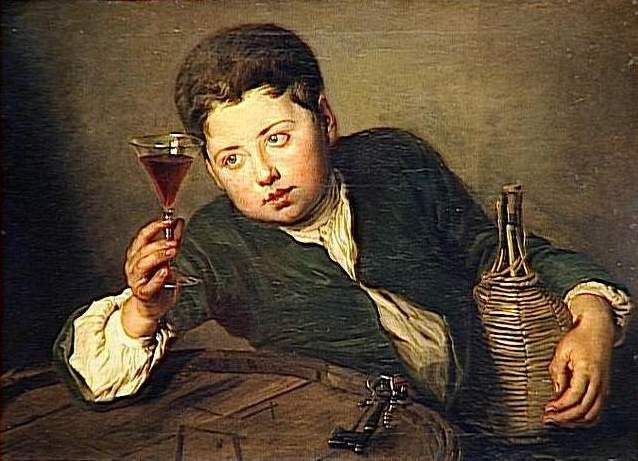
The Young Wine Taster, c. 1725–1730, Louvre, Paris

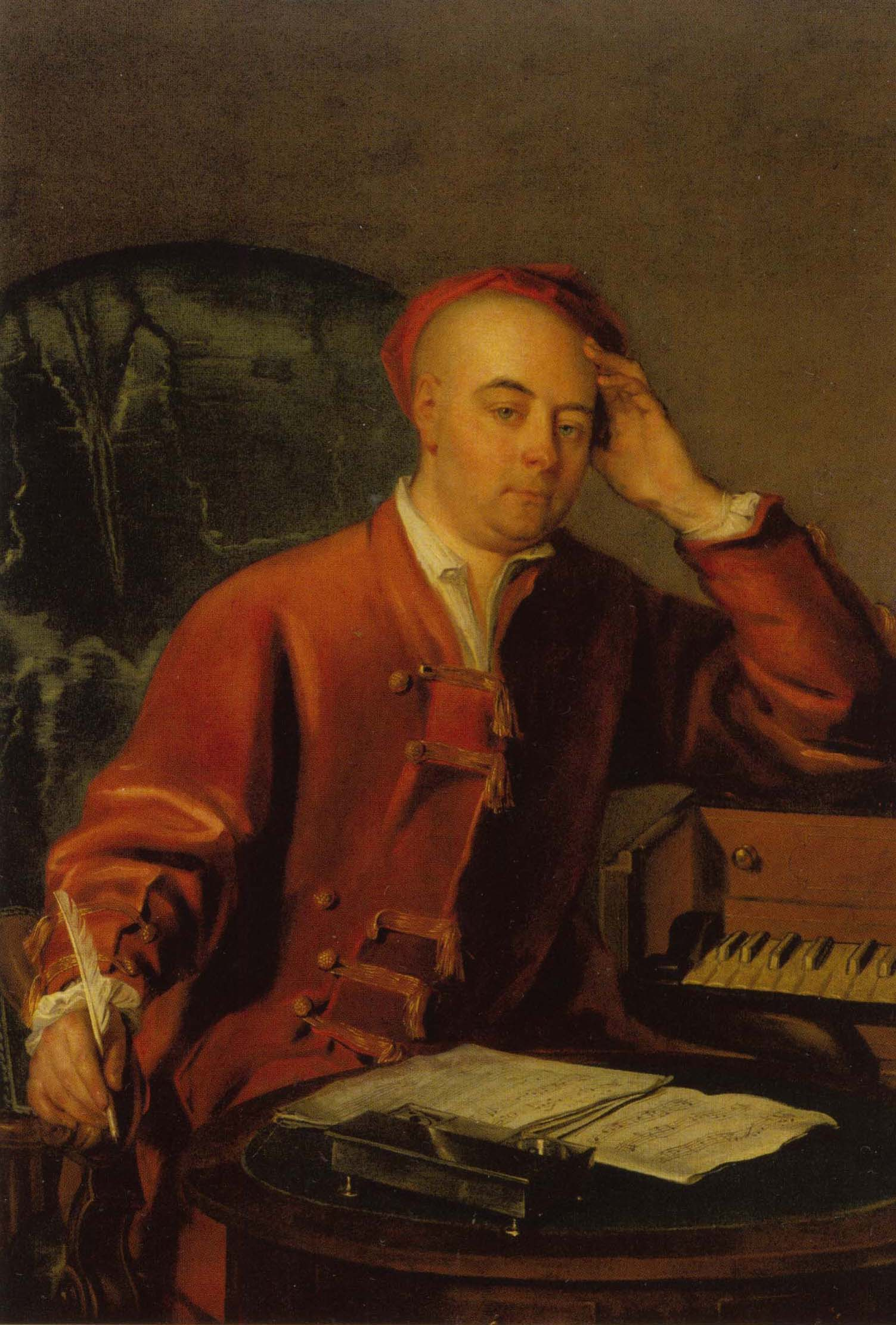
George Frideric Handel, ca. 1730, Handel House Museum, London

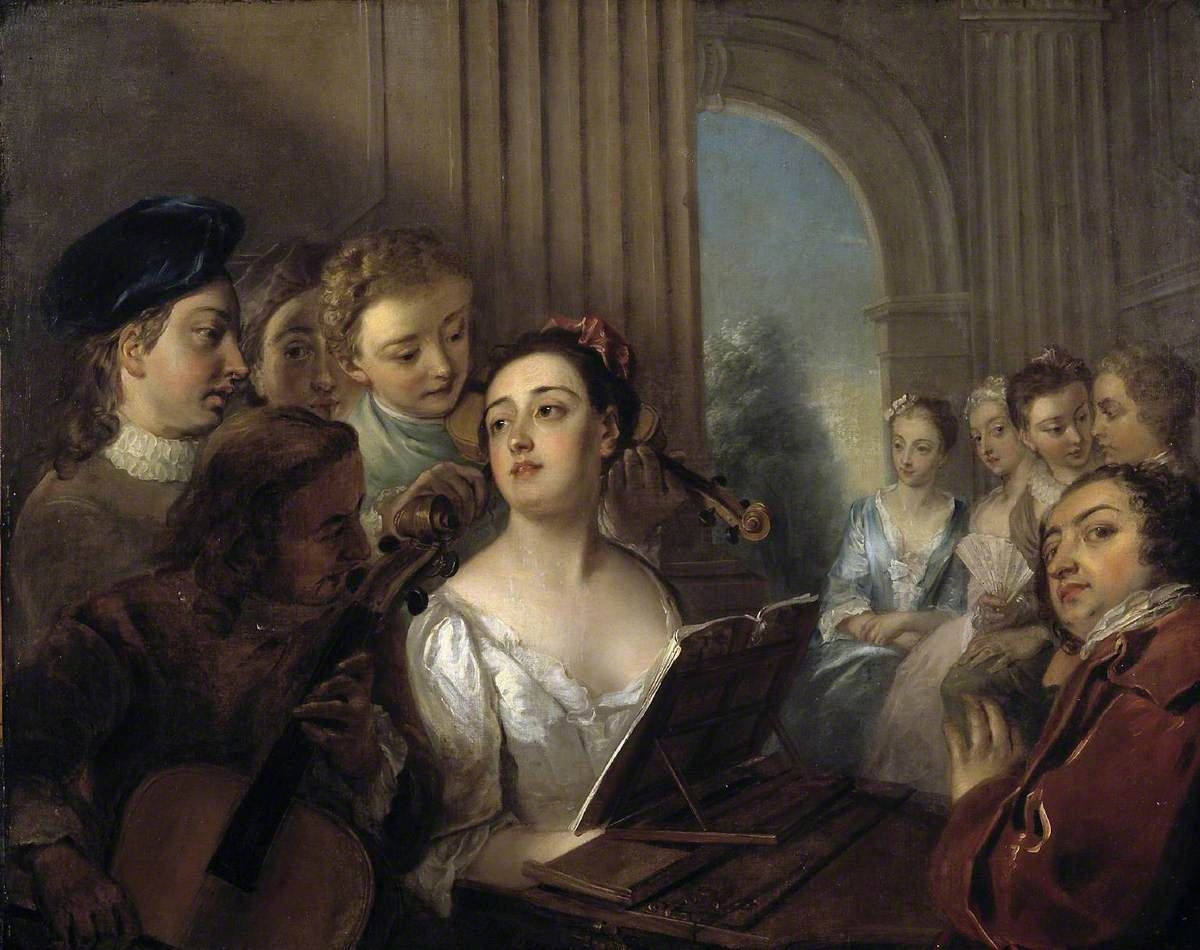
A Music Party, ca. 1735–1740, Tate Britain, London

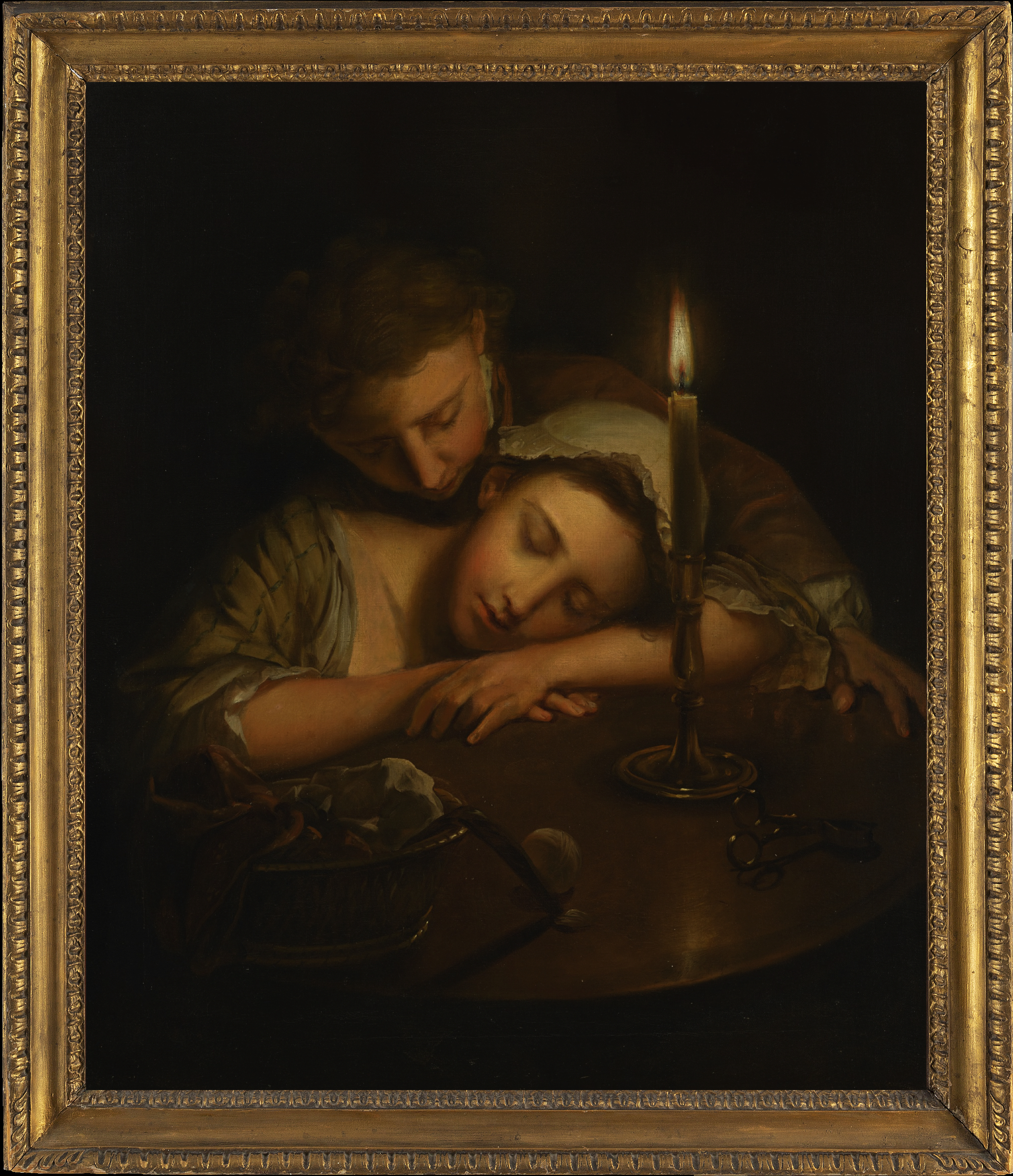
Lovers by Candlelight, ca. 1740s, private collection

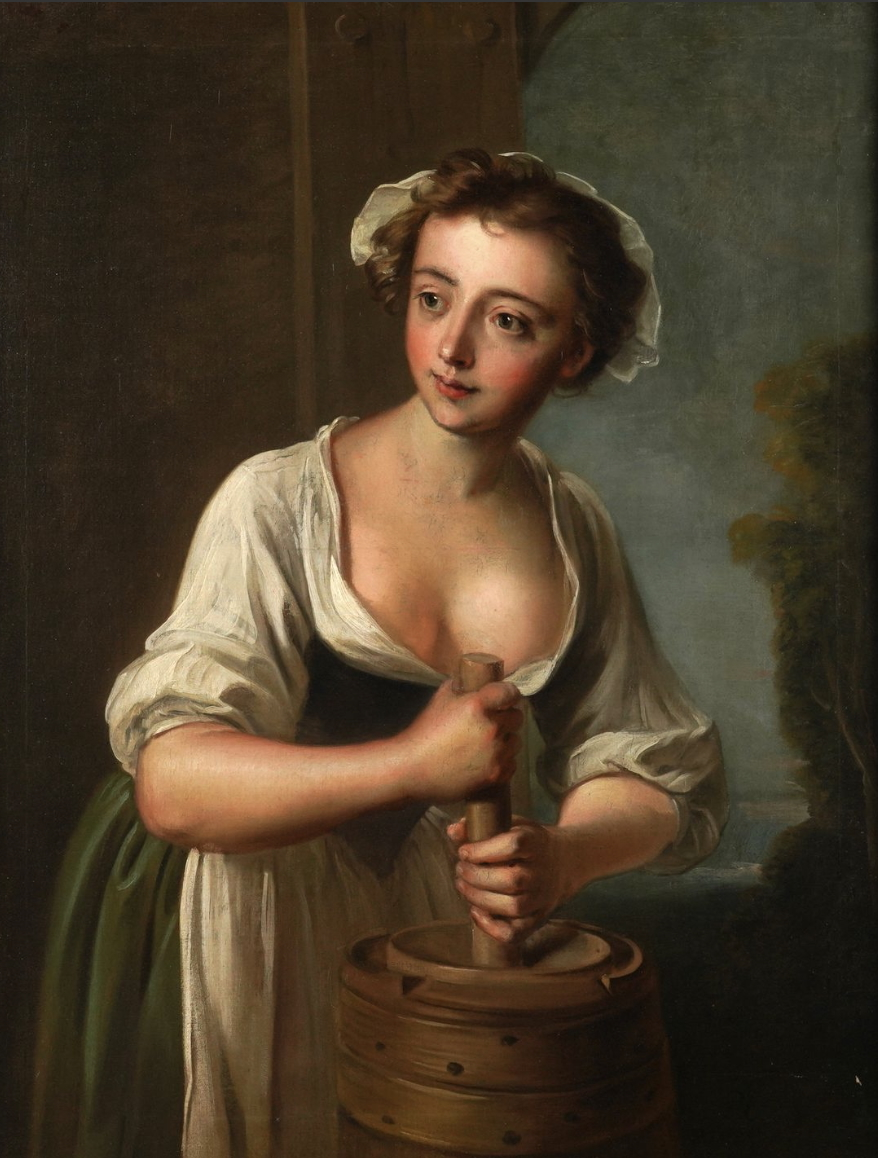
Rural Life: The Industrious Dairymaid, circa 1740, Private Collection

== Gallery ==
Rural Life engraved in mezzotint by John Faber Jr. after Philippe Mercier
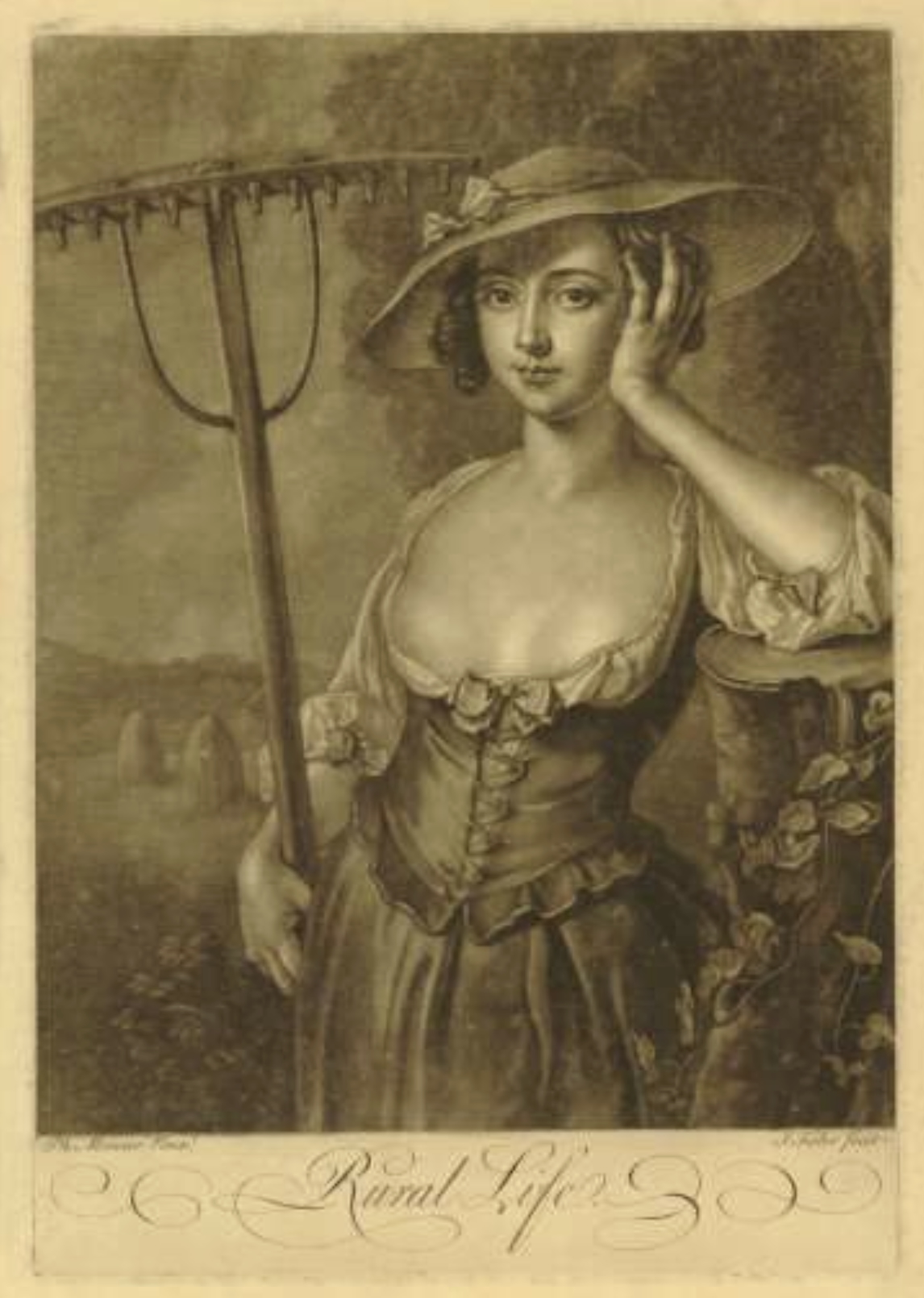
Engraved by John Faber the Younger after Philippe Mercier – ‘’Rural Life - A girl resting from haymaking’’ Chaloner Smith 405 British Museum, London

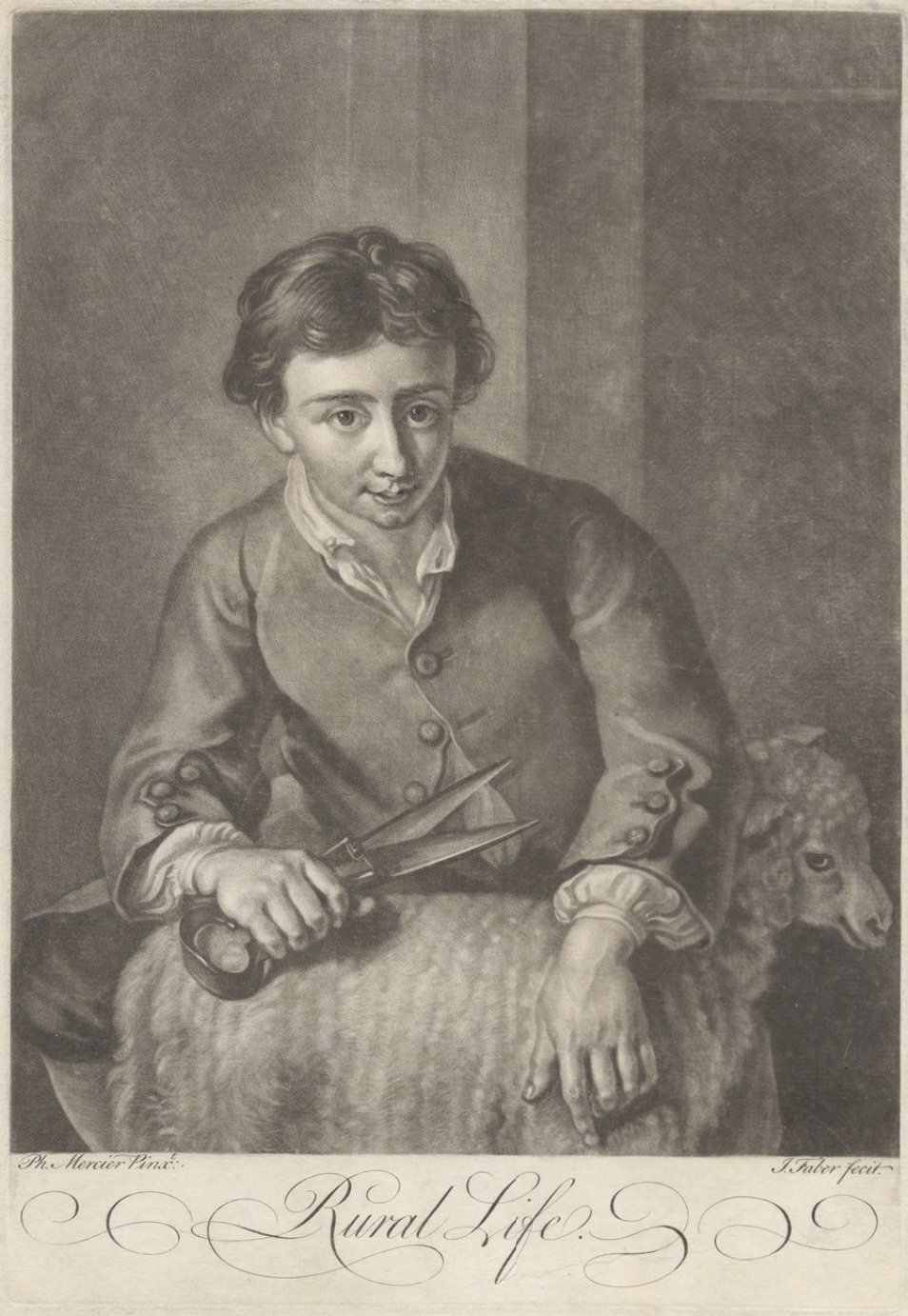
Engraved by John Faber the Younger after Philippe Mercier – ‘’Rural Life - Young Male Shearing a Sheep’’ Chaloner Smith 405 Yale Center for British Art

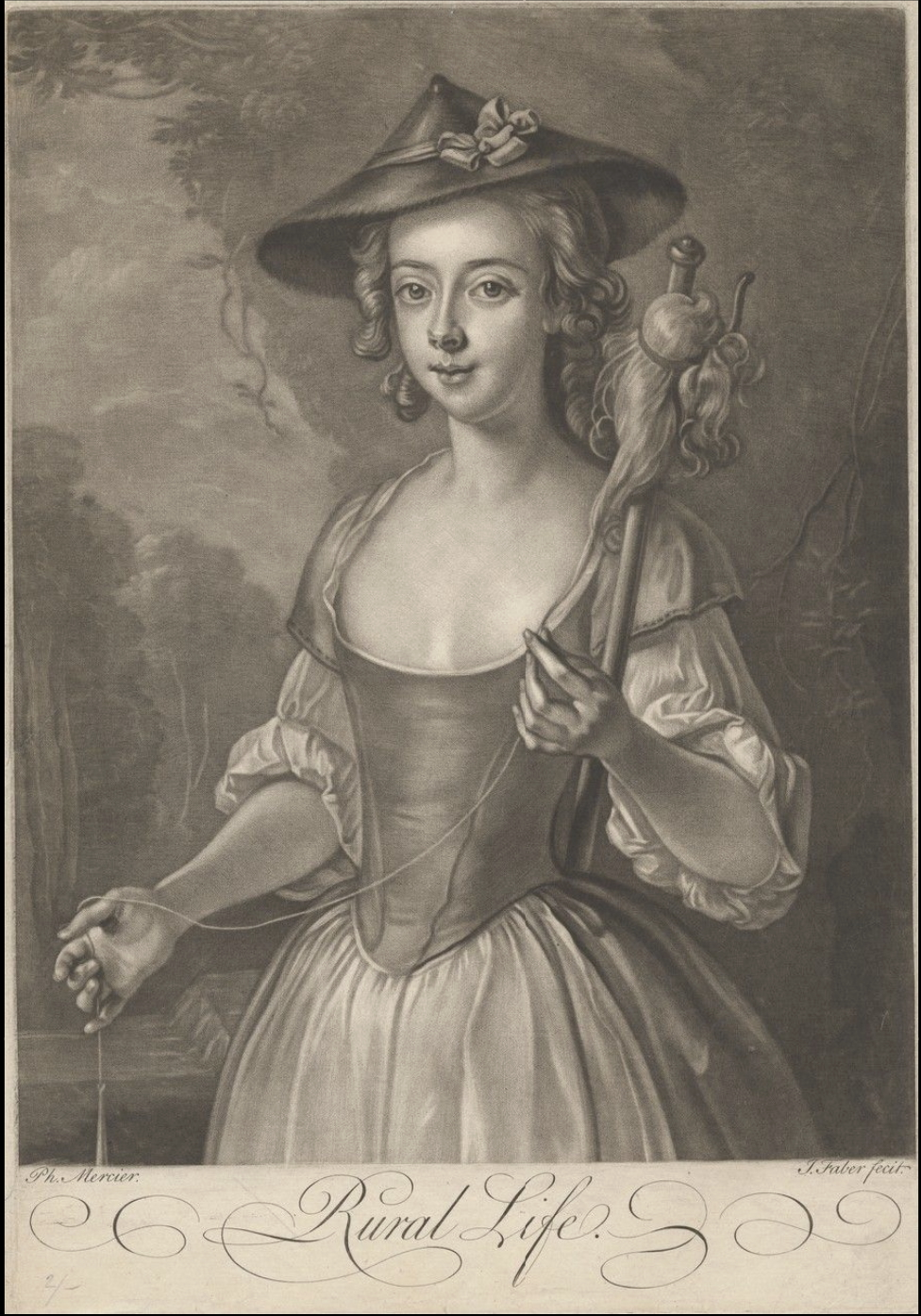
Engraved by John Faber the Younger after Philippe Mercier – ‘’Rural Life - A Girl Spinning Thread’’ Chaloner Smith 405 Yale Center for British Art

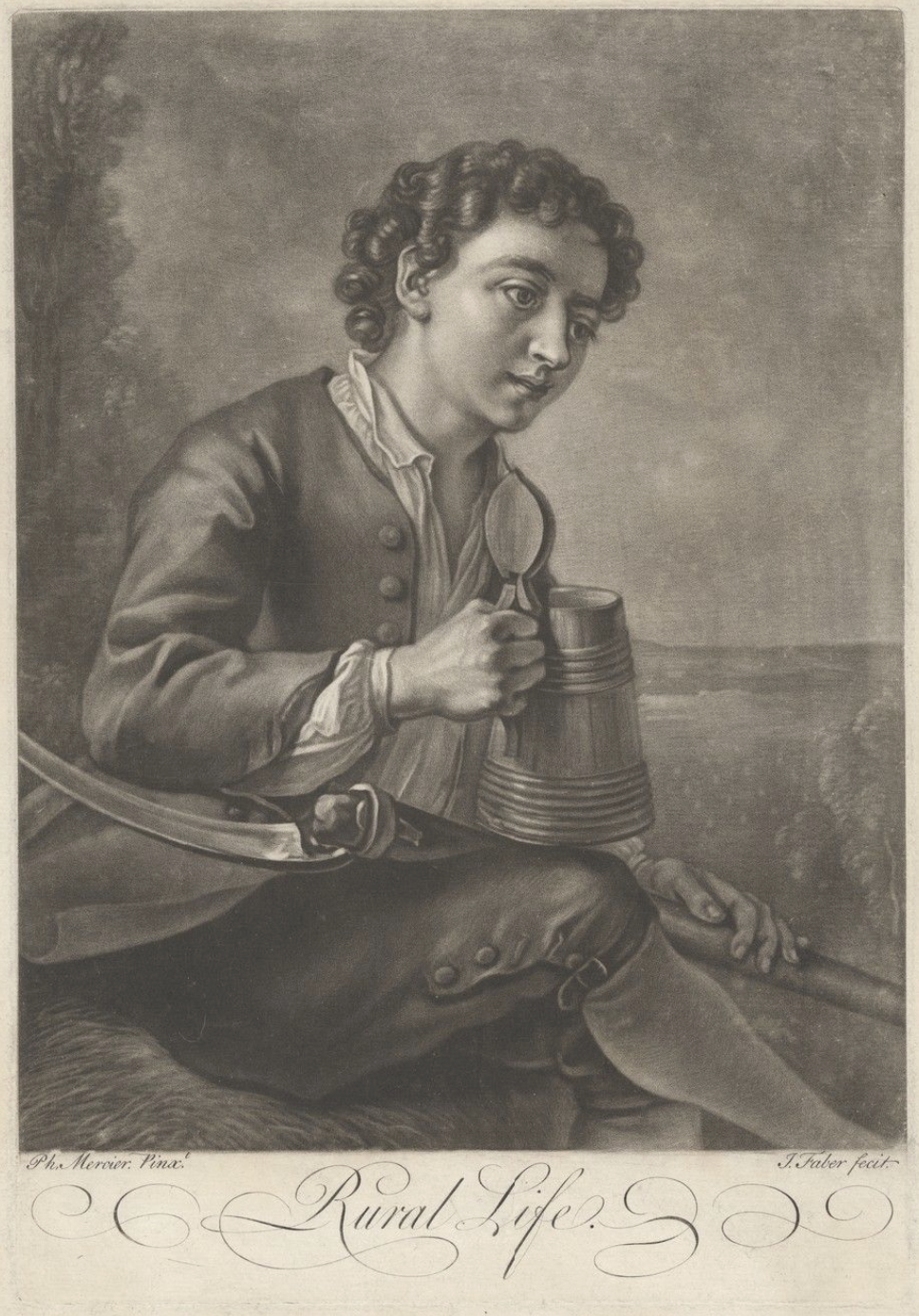
Engraved by John Faber the Younger after Philippe Mercier – ‘’Rural Life - The Scytheman's Refreshment’’ Chaloner Smith 405 Yale Center for British Art

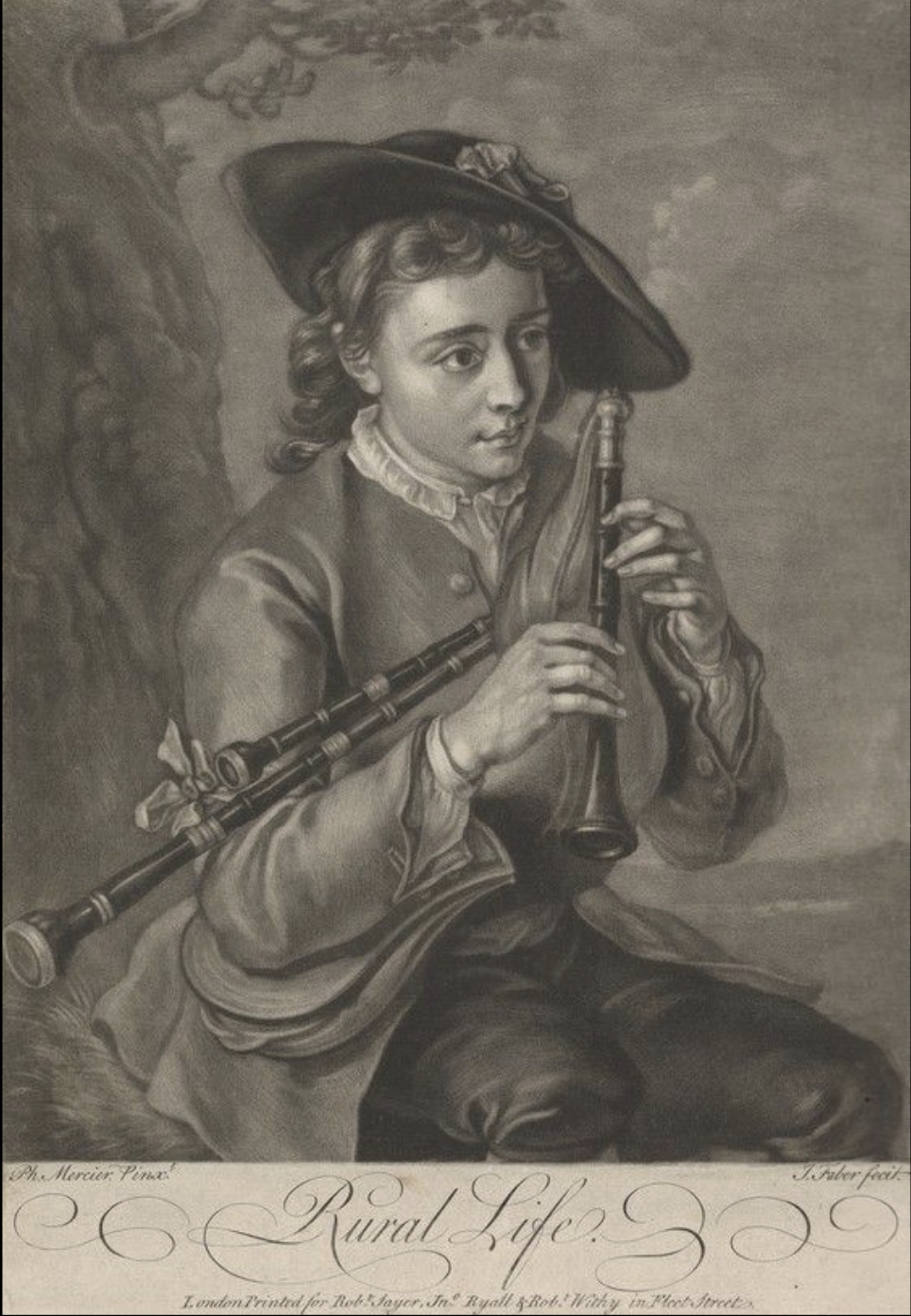
Engraved by John Faber the Younger after Philippe Mercier – ‘’Rural Life - Youth Playing Bagpipes’’ Chaloner Smith 405 Yale Center for British Art

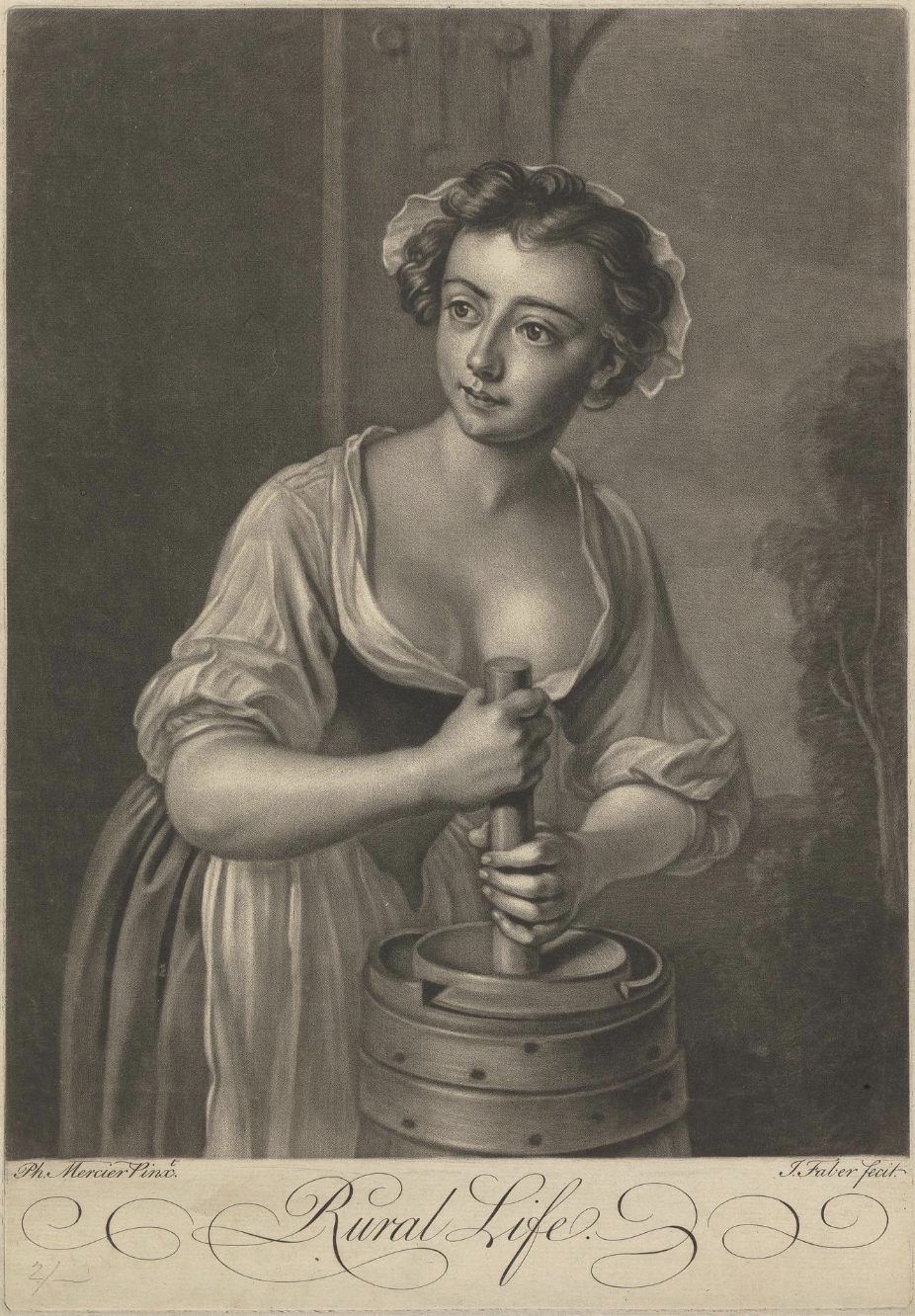
Engraved by John Faber the Younger after Philippe Mercier – ‘’Rural Life - The Housewife's Employment’’ Chaloner Smith 405 Yale Center for British Art

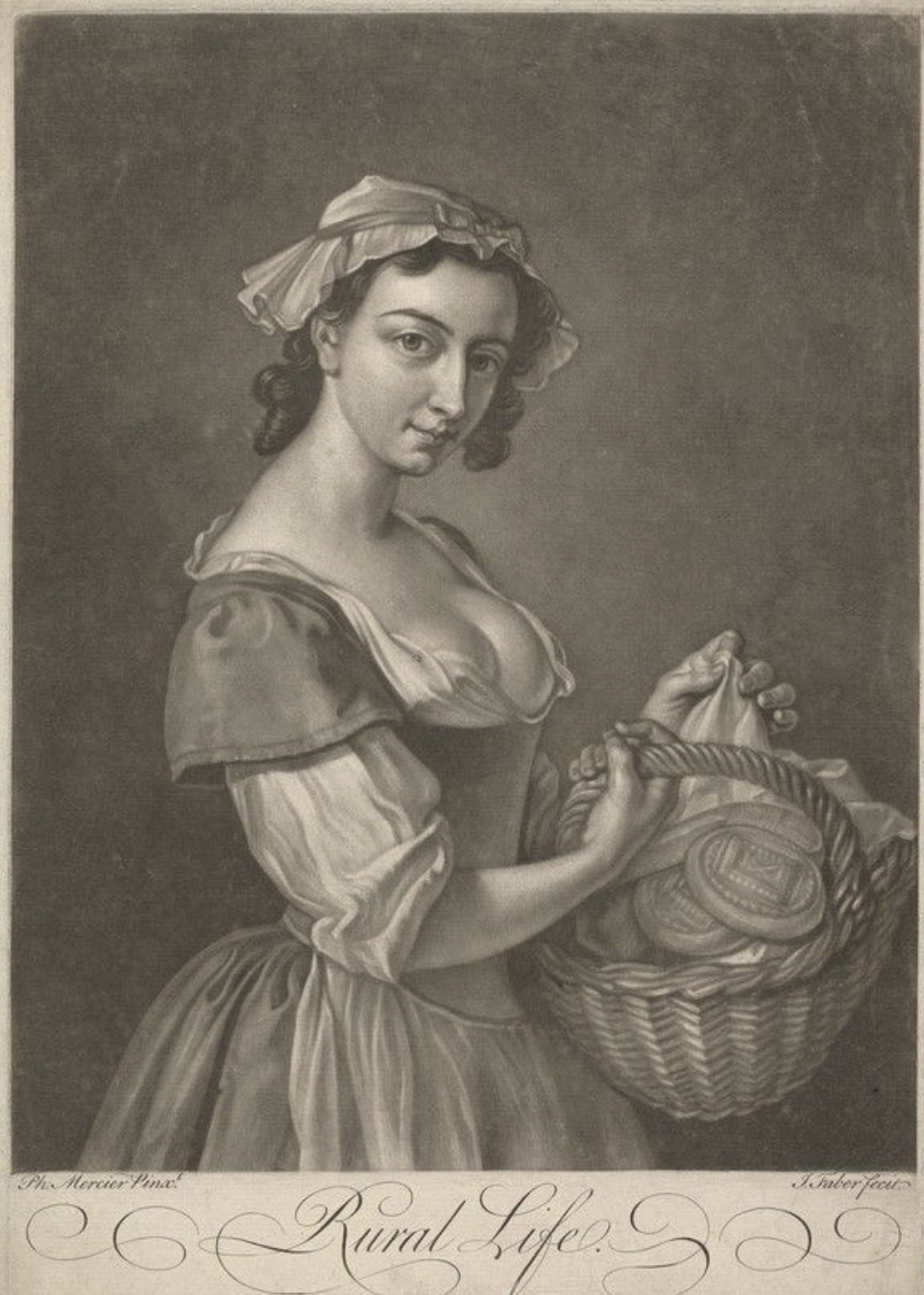
Engraved by John Faber the Younger after Philippe Mercier – ‘’Rural Life - The Dairymaid's Occupation’’ Chaloner Smith 407 Yale Center for British Art

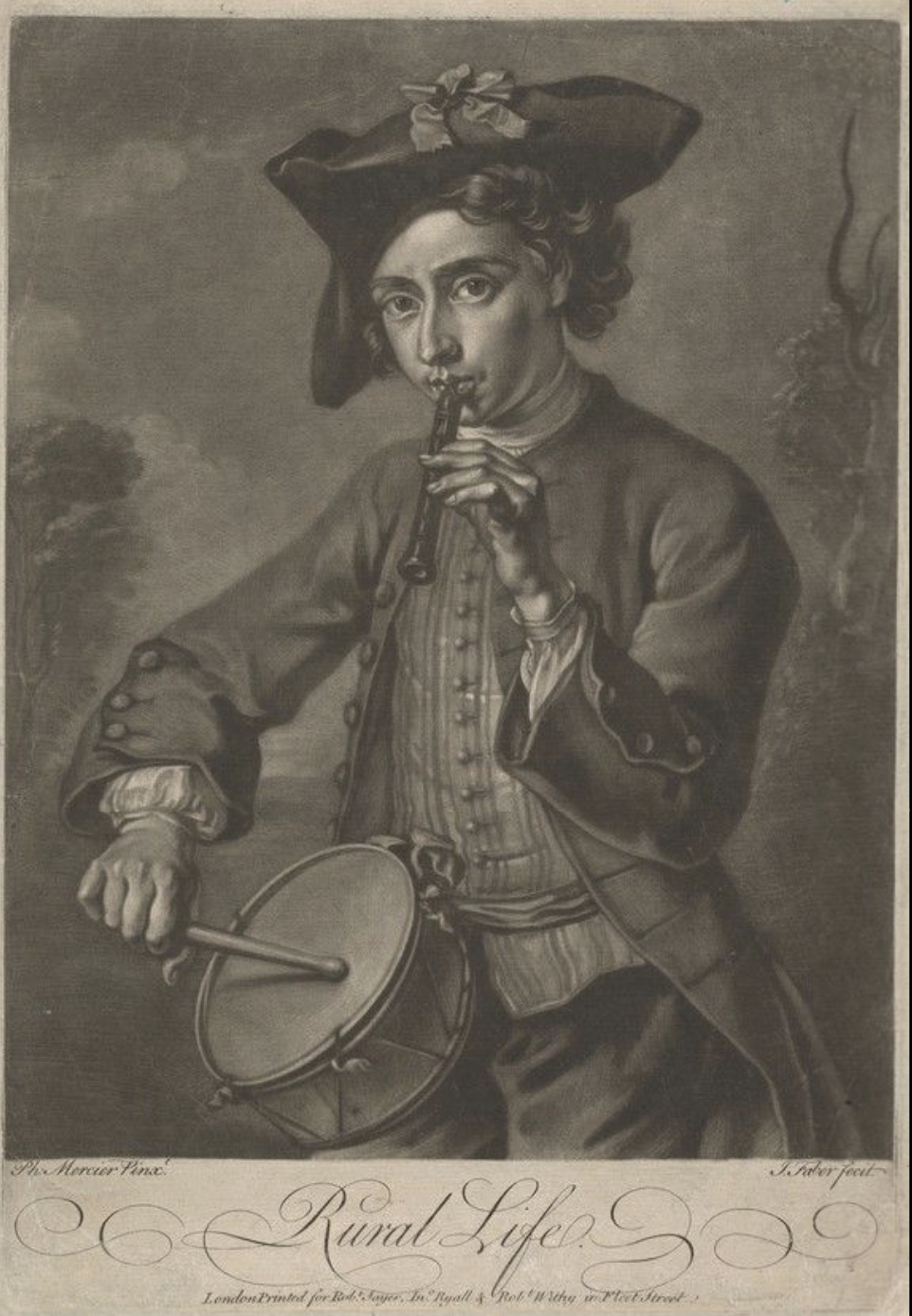
Engraved by John Faber the Younger after Philippe Mercier – ‘’Rural Life - The Swain's Amusement’’ Chaloner Smith 407 Yale Center for British Art
