= Pompeo Aldrovandini =

Italian painter (1677–1735)

- Born: 1677; Bologna
- Died: 1735 (aged 57–58); Rome
- Known for: Painting
- Movement: Baroque

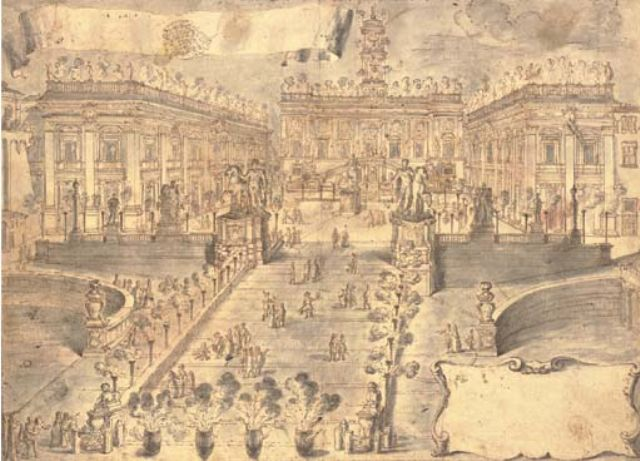
The Cordonata and Piazza del Campidoglio, Rome, with fireworks and revellers celebrating the election of Pope Clement XII Corsini (1730) Red chalk, ink with pen and wash. 32.1 x 44.3 cm

Pompeo Aldrovandini (1677–1735) was an Italian painter of the Baroque period. Born in Bologna to a family of painters, he mainly learned from his cousin Tommaso Aldrovandini and was employed much in the decoration of churches, palaces, and theatres of Dresden, Prague, and Vienna. He died at Rome.
