= Princess Irene =

Princess or Prinzess Irene may refer to:

- Irene Angelina (fl. late 1100s)
- Princess Irene of Hesse and by Rhine (1866 – 1953), daughter of Princess Alice of the United Kingdom and Ludwig IV, Grand Duke of Hesse and by Rhine
- Princess Irene, Duchess of Aosta (1904 – 1974), daughter of Constantine I of Greece and his wife, the former Princess Sophie of Prussia
- Irene Galitzine (1916 - 2006), daughter of Prince Boris of Galitzine and Nina Petrovna Kovaldji
- Princess Irene of the Netherlands (born 1939), daughter of Queen Juliana and Prince Bernhard of the Netherlands
- Princess Irene of Greece and Denmark (1942 – 2026), daughter of King Paul of Greece and Frederika of Hanover

== Fiction ==
- The titular character in The Princess and the Goblin

== Ships ==
- SS Princess Irene, a number of steamships with this name
