= Robert Finch (antiquarian) =

English antiquarian

- Born: 27 December 1783; London, United Kingdom
- Died: 16 September 1830 (aged 46); Rome, Italy

Robert Finch (27 December 1783 – 16 September 1830) was an English antiquary. He lived in Italy for many years, where he was on the periphery of the Shelley circle and was a friend and patron to a number of British expatriate artists. He left his library, pictures, coins, and medals to the Ashmolean Museum in Oxford.

== Biography ==
Robert Finch was born in London on 27 December 1783, the only son of Thomas Finch (d. 1810), FRS. He was educated for a short time at St. Paul's School, and at eighteen was admitted to Balliol College, Oxford. He graduated with a B.A. in 1806, and was awarded his M.A. in 1809. He was ordained in 1807, and officiated at Maidstone and elsewhere.

In 1814 Finch went abroad, visiting Portugal, France, Switzerland, Italy, Greece, and the Holy Land. He based himself in Italy and for several years before his death he lived in Rome. While living in Italy he pretended to have been a lieutenant-colonel in the 16th Light Dragoons. He explained this away to those who knew differently as an affectation that made the crossing of international frontiers easier.

Mary Shelley met Finch in Rome in April 1819 while he was affecting the persona of his retired British colonel and dubbed him "Colonel Calicot Finch" after a character in Thomas Moore's The Fudge Family in Paris published the previous year. He considered himself debonair and extended friendship and patronage to expatriate British artists in Italy - including Joseph Severn, Sir Charles Eastlake, William Etty and in later in his life Crabb Robinson - who on the whole thought him vain and pretentious. Although Finch was on the periphery of the Shelley circle his journals have proved useful to scholars as a source of information on the circle's continental acquaintances.

In 1821 Finch informed John Gisborne by letter of the support Joseph Severn had given to John Keats in the months preceding Keats's death. Gisborne showed the letter to a number of his friends including Percy Shelley. The letter, or the events it described, moved Shelley to add a tribute to Severn in Adonais in which he deliberately misquotes Finch to gild the tribute. In November that year Shelley wrote a letter to Severn enclosing the poem. It was this letter and prefix which earned Severn's actions an honourable mention in the Dictionary of National Biography.

Finch died at his home, the Palazzo del Re di Prussia, in Rome, on 16 September 1830, from malarial fever. There is imposing Gothic monument to him in the English cemetery in Rome.

== Legacy ==
Finch was a fellow of the Society of Antiquaries, and a contributor to the Gentleman's Magazine and other periodicals.

Warwick Wroth, his biographer in the Dictionary of National Biography, writing in 1889, stated that "Finch had a great love of the fine arts, and studied antiquities and topography. He left his library, pictures, coins, and medals to the Ashmolean Museum, Oxford, and his plate to Balliol College".

Since that time the reputation of his collection has tarnished as art historians have re-evaluated its paintings and found the previous attributions to major artists to have been wrong, and its coins and Napoleonic medals are not now considered to be of any special note. His own reputation has also suffered: Alan Bell, his biographer in the Oxford Dictionary of National Biography, wrote in 2004 that "A small place in the footnotes of Romantic scholarship gives this pretentious ass a lingering reputation that his collections would never have justified".

== Family ==
He married in 1820, when in Italy, Maria, eldest daughter of Frederick Thomson of Kensington, but left no issue.
