= August Riedel =

German painter

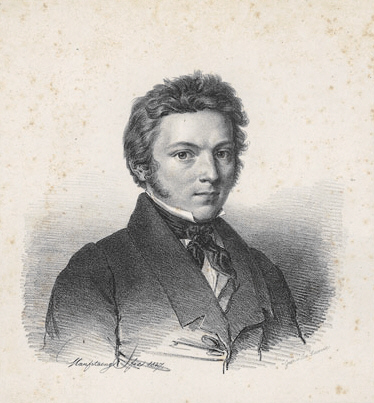
August Riedel; portrait by Franz Hanfstaengl (1827)

Johann Friedrich Ludwig Heinrich August Riedel (25 December 1799 – 6 August 1883) was a German painter who spent much of his career in Italy.

== Life and work ==
He was born in Bayreuth. His father was the architect Karl Christian Riedel. His mother was Marianne Eleonora (née Tretzel). He studied at the Academy of Fine Arts, Munich, with Robert von Langer, then went to Dresden, where he was able to copy works by the Old Masters. Their treatment of color had a great influence on his mature works.

In 1823, he was able to visit Italy, where he met many of the German artists associated with the Nazarene movement. From 1828 to 1829, he returned to Italy and stayed in Florence. After three more years in Munich, he settled permanently in Rome; although he travelled extensively and would occasionally return to Germany to fulfill commissions.

He was especially known for his genre scenes and sensitive portraits of women. One of his best known early works is a portrayal of the Biblical figure, Judith, from 1840.

Although he enjoyed great financial success, receiving commissions from members of the German and Italian nobilities, as well as the Kingdom of Bavaria, he outlived his style and came to be seen as old-fashioned as critical tastes turned to Realism. By the time he had grown old, his fame had greatly diminished.

He was a professor at Accademia di San Luca until his death at age eighty-three and was interred at the Protestant Cemetery, Rome. His works may be seen at the Neue Pinakothek in Munich and the Alte Nationalgalerie in Berlin.

== Selected paintings ==
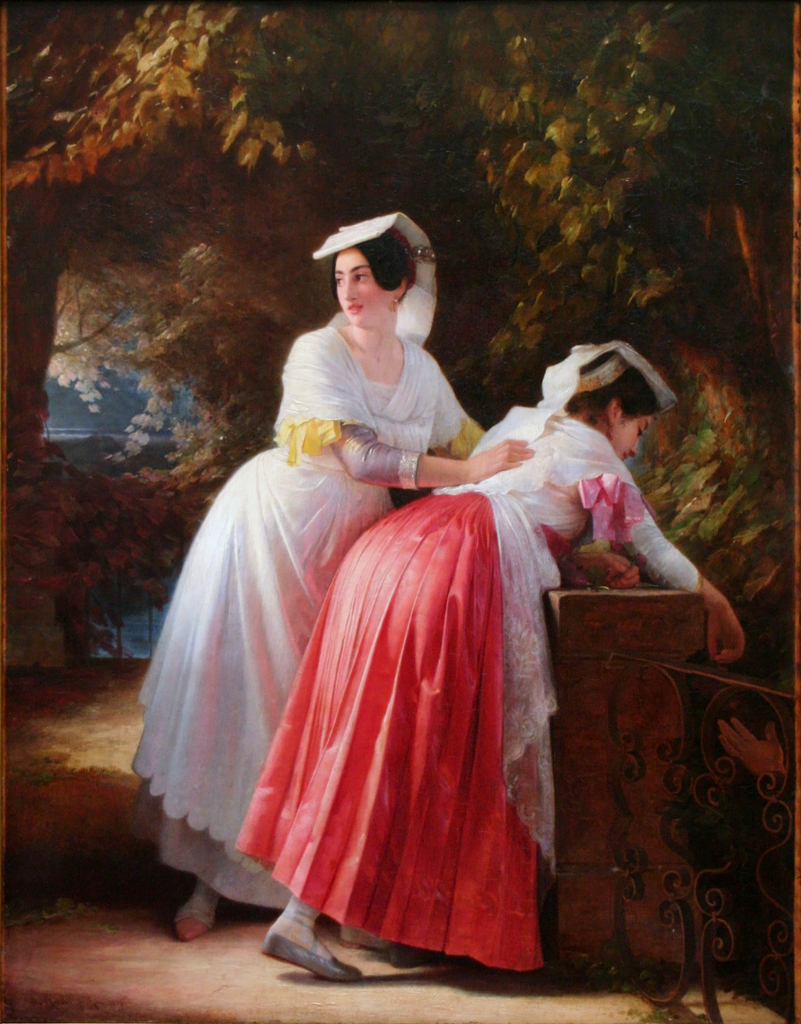
Women from Albano

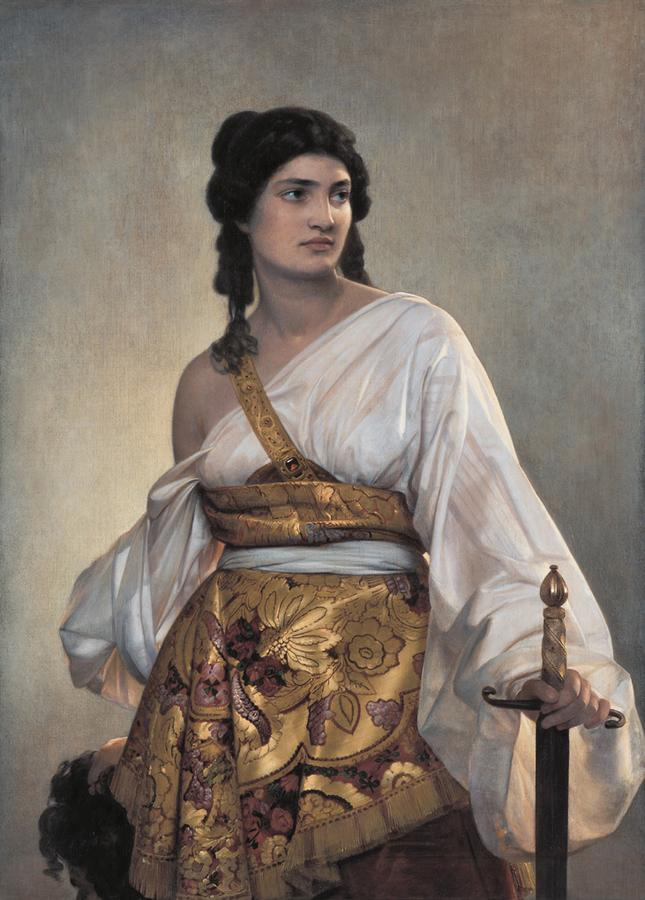
Judith

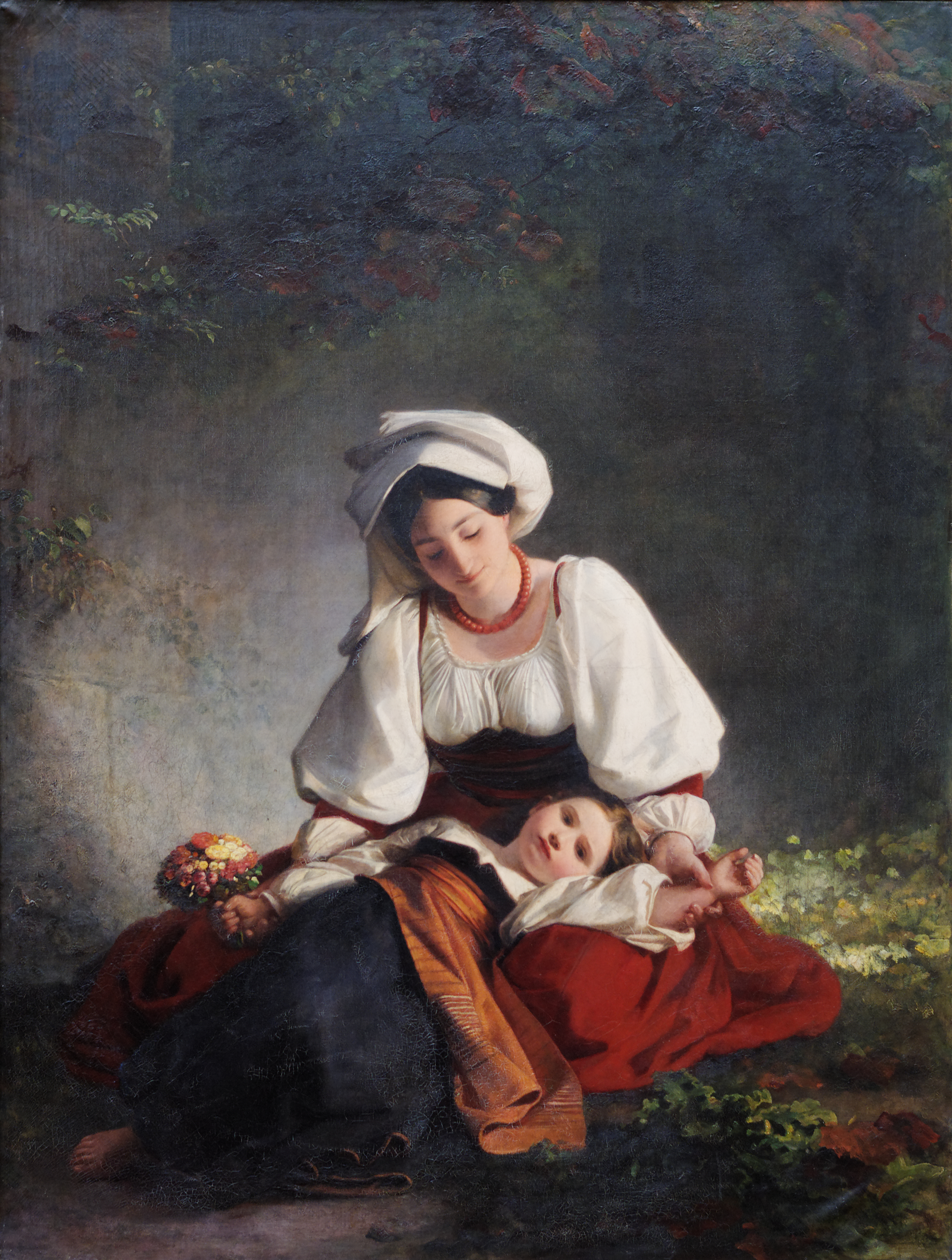
A Mother from Alvito

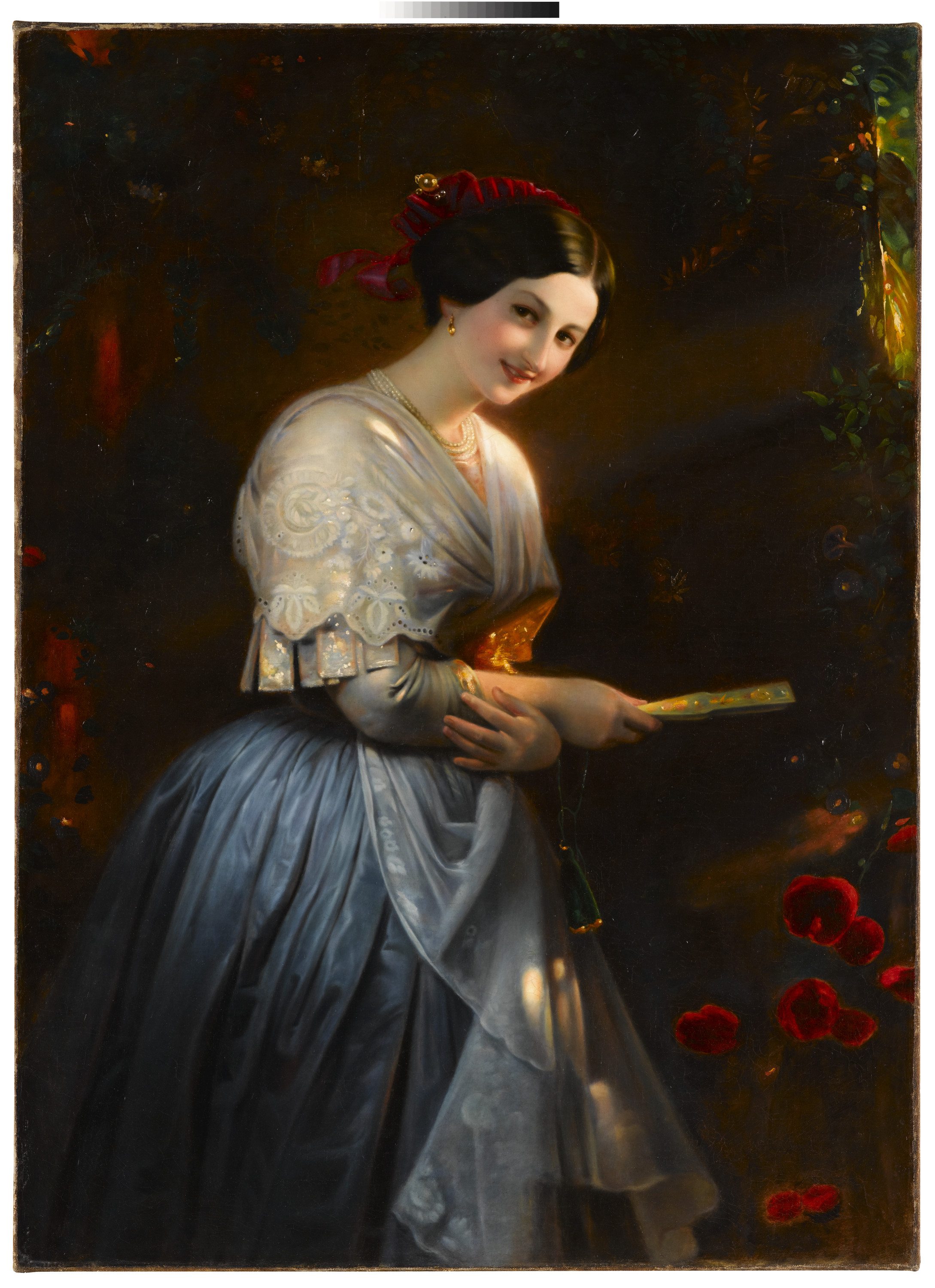
Römerin in Albano

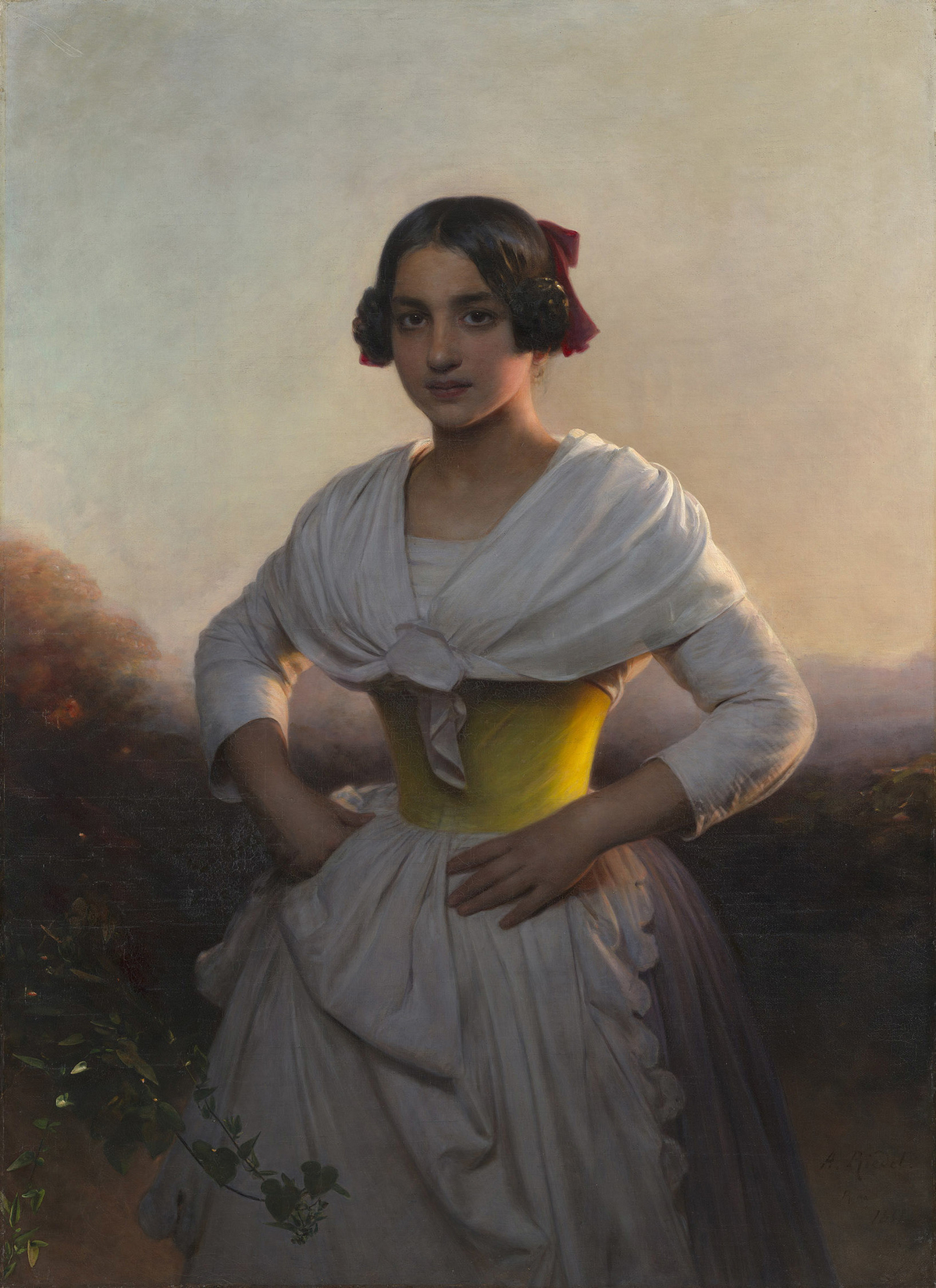
Marianna Verettoni

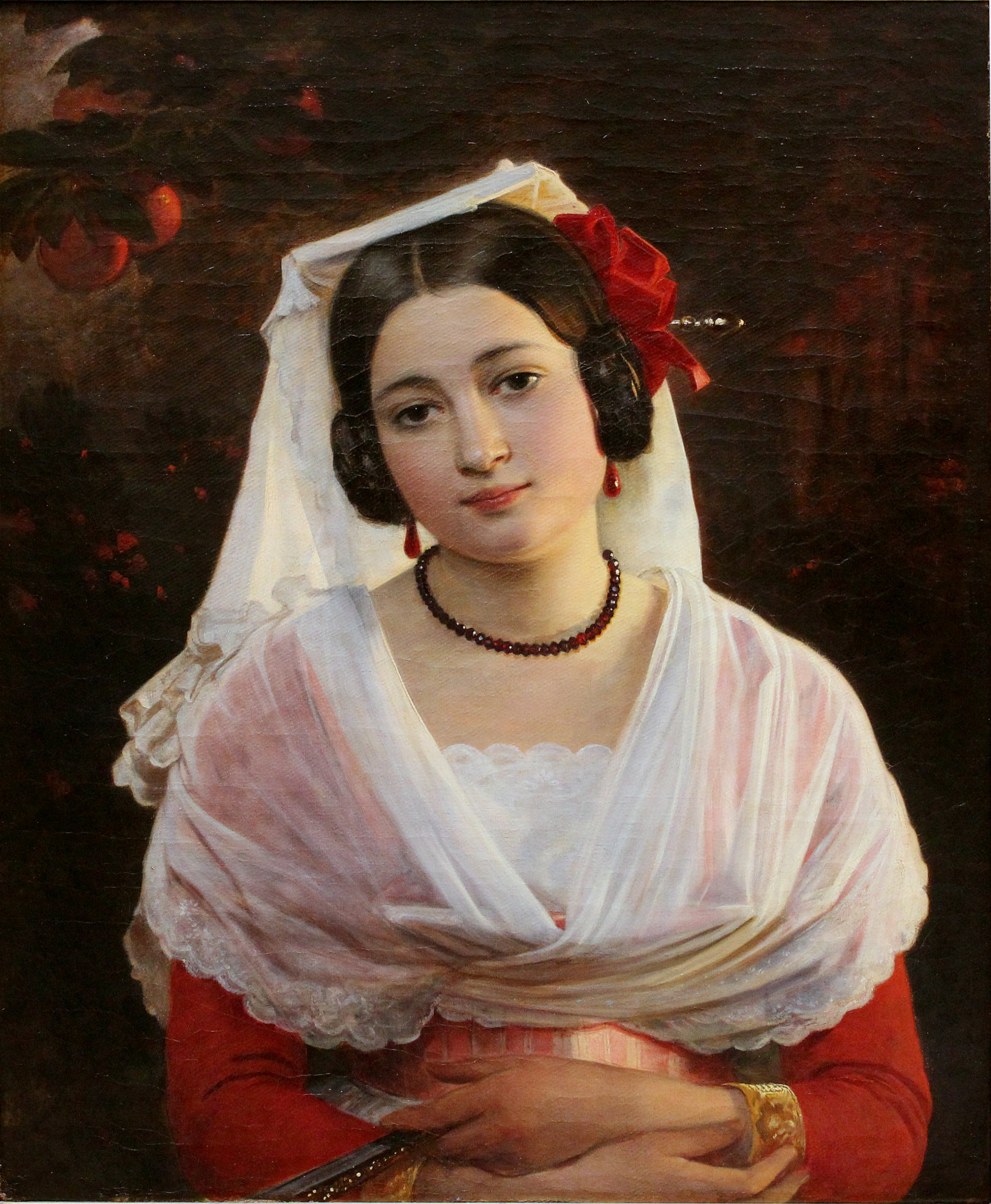
Felice Berardi aus Albano

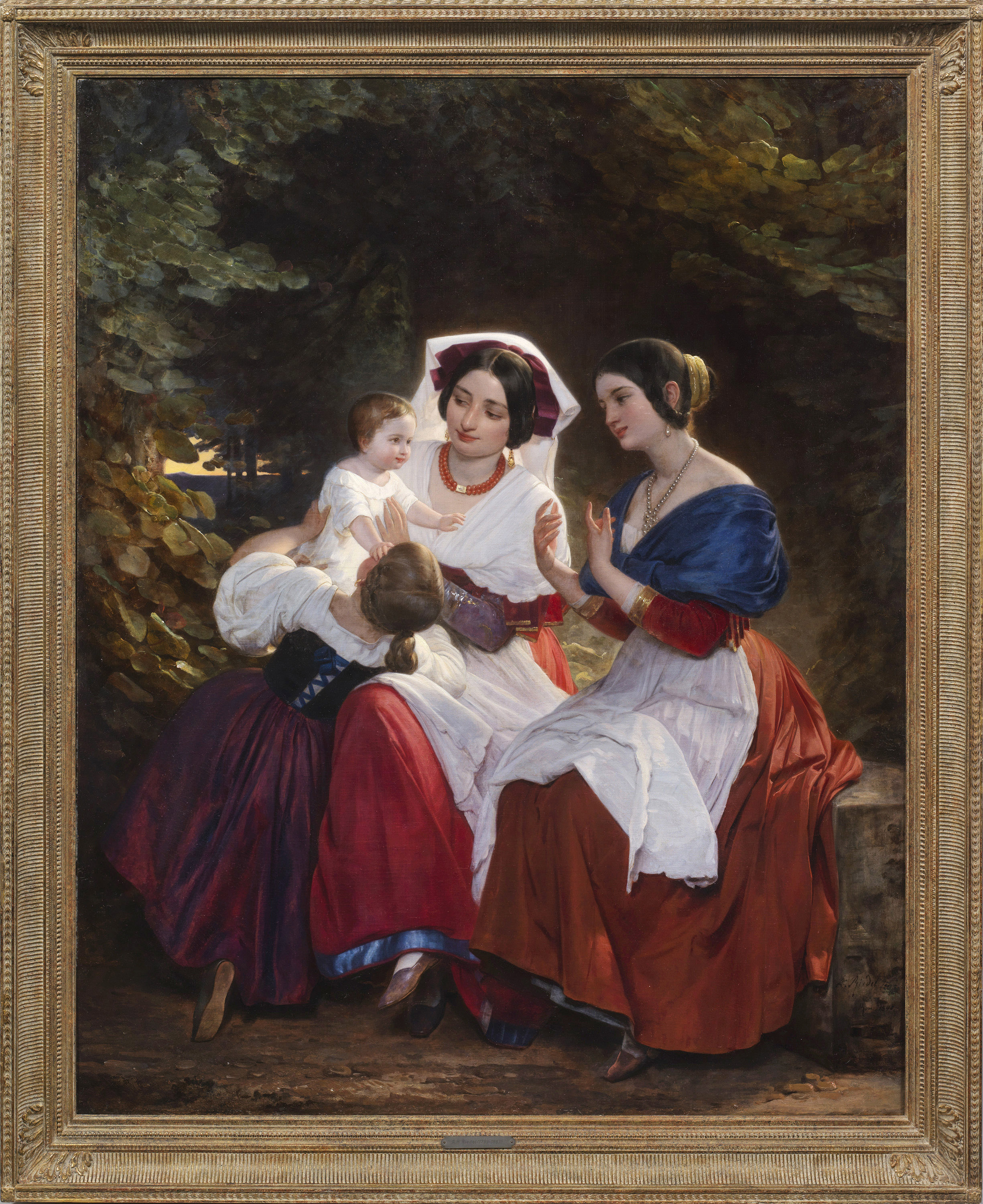
Happy Mother

== Sources ==
- Hyacinth Holland (1889). "Riedel, August" . Allgemeine Deutsche Biographie (in German). Vol. 28. Leipzig: Duncker & Humblot. pp. 517–519.
- Georg Kaspar Nagler; "Riedel, August", In: Neues allgemeines Künstlerlexicon, Vol.13, E. A. Fleischmann, 1843, pp. 151–154 Online
