= Tatiana Sukhotina-Tolstaya =

Russian painter and memoirist

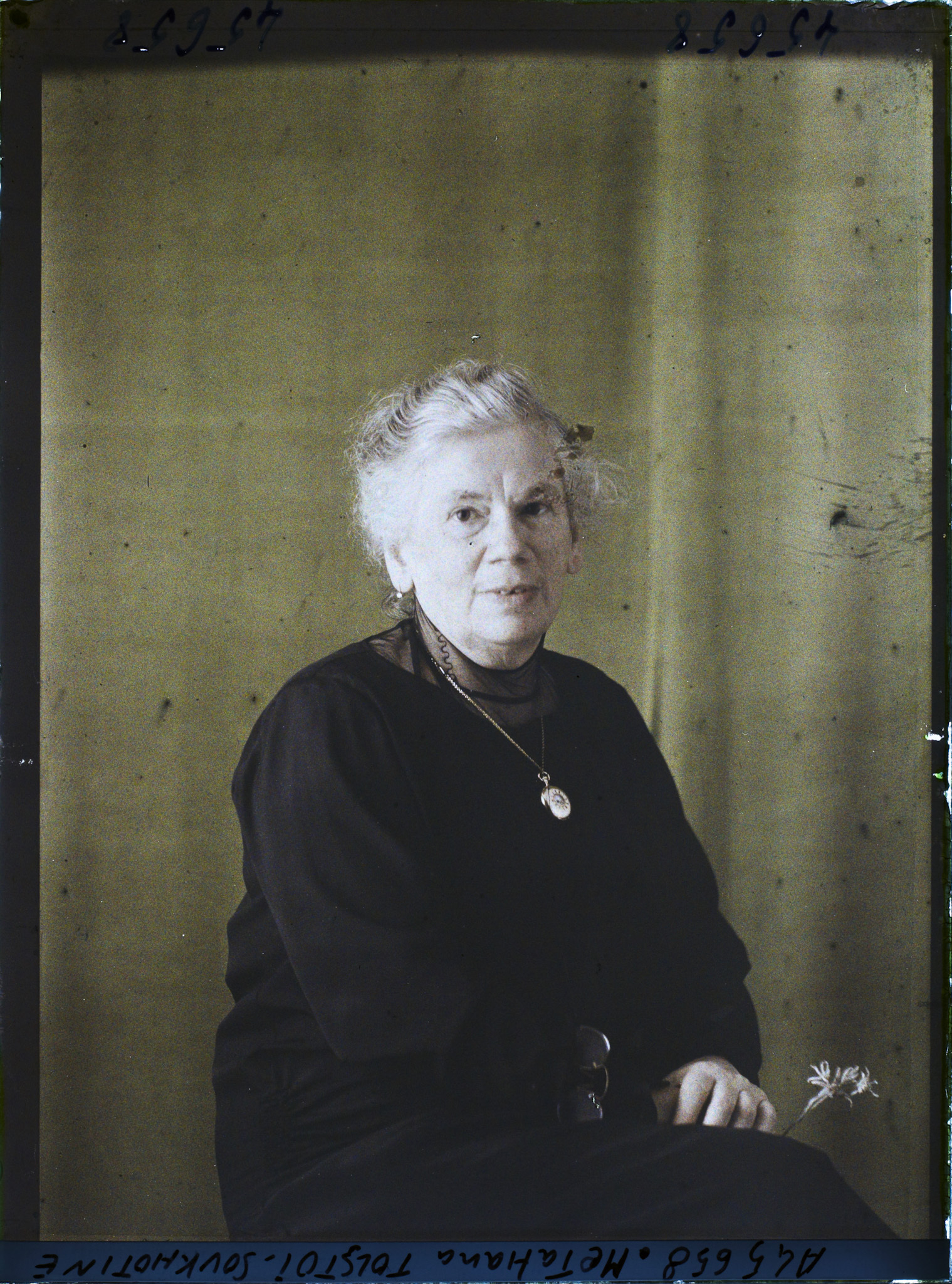
- Tatiana Tolstaya, age 61
- Born: Татьяна Львовна Толстая; 4 October 1864; Yasnaya Polyana, Russian Empire
- Died: 21 September 1950 (aged 85); Rome, Italy
- Resting place: Non-Catholic Cemetery, Rome
- Other names: Tatiana Soukhotina-Tolstaïa; Tatiana Soukhotine-Tolstoï
- Spouse: Mikhail Sergeevich Sukhotin (1850–1914)
- Children: Tatiana Sukhotina-Tolstaya Albertini (1905–1996)
- Parent(s): Leo Tolstoy, Sophia Tolstaya
- Media related to Tatyana Sukhotina-Tolstaya at Wikimedia Commons

Countess Tatiana Lvovna Sukhotina-Tolstaya (Russian: Графиня Татья́на Льво́вна Сухо́тина-Толста́я; French: Comtesse Tatiana Soukhotina-Tolstaïa; 4 October 1864 – 21 September 1950), was a Russian painter and memoirist. She was the second child and oldest daughter of writer Leo Tolstoy.

== Biography ==
Tatiana (known in her family as Tanya) was born and grew up at Yasnaya Polyana, her father's estate south of Tula.

She demonstrated an early love of painting, and in 1881 she entered the Moscow School of Painting, Sculpture and Architecture, where her teachers were Vasily Perov, Illarion Pryanishnikov, and Leonid Pasternak; she also studied with Nikolai Ge.

Devoted to her father and his ideals, she had rejected a number of suitors. In 1897, she fell in love with Mikhail Sergeevich Sukhotin (1850—1914), although he was almost in his 50s and married with six children.

For several months Tatiana had a platonic friendship with Sukhotin, despite having misgivings. She first mentioned him in her diary on November 2, 1882.

I am ashamed when I think of Sukhotin's wife and children, although he assured me that I am depriving them of nothing and although I know his wife stopped loving him long ago....Papa is the great rival of all lovers and none has been able to vanquish him yet. But this love of mine is competing more strongly than any other has done so far.

— Tatiana Sukhotina-Tolstaya, her journal

Sukhotin's wife died later that year, and on 9 October, Tatiana announced her desire to marry Sukhotin to her father, who responded with a fiercely uncompromising rejection ("But why a pure girl should want to get mixed up in such a business is beyond me").

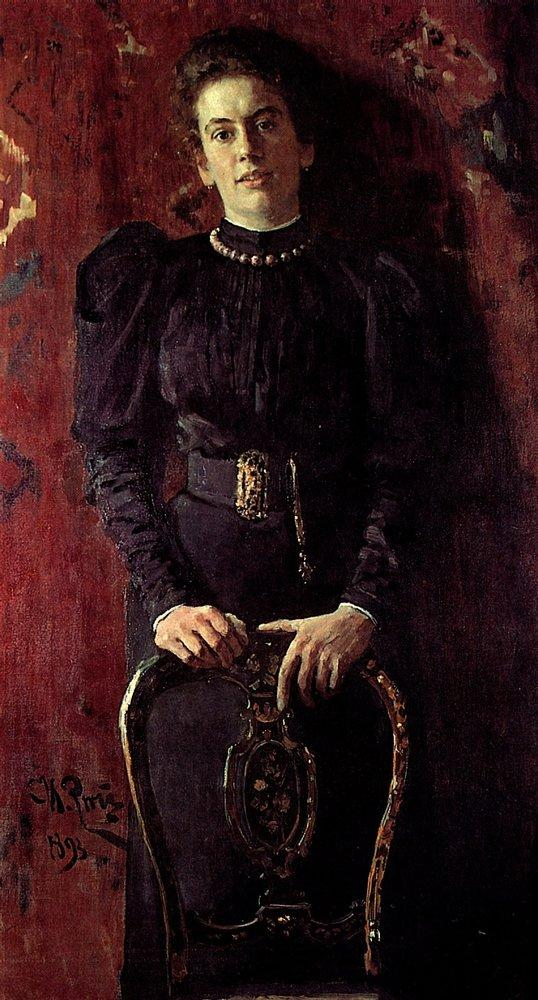
Tatiana Tolstaya, by Ilya Repin (1893); Yasnaya Polyana Museum

Tatiana gave in for the time being, but finally insisted, and on 14 November 1899 the couple were married. They lived on Sukhotin's estate, "Kochety" ("The Roosters") in Tula guberniya, about 30 km (19 mi) east of Orel.

On 19 November 1905, she gave birth at Yasnaya Polyana to her only child, a daughter also called Tatiana.

After her husband's death in 1914, Tatiana moved back to Yasnaya Polyana, which was eventually turned into a museum. From 1917 to 1923 she was guardian of the museum; from 1923 to 1925 she was director of the Lev Tolstoy State Museum in Moscow.

In 1925, together with her daughter, she immigrated to Paris, where she was hostess to Bunin, Chaliapin, Stravinsky, Alexandre Benois, and other members of the Russian exile community. From Paris she moved to Italy, where she spent her final years.

In her diary entry on 13 December 1932, she wrote: "I have lived an incredibly and undeservedly happy and interesting life. And successful."

She died in 1950 in Rome, aged 85. She was buried at the Non-Catholic Cemetery, Rome.

Her memoir, based on the journals she maintained from 1878 to 1932, was published in English in 1951 and French in 1953. Aside from excerpts in Novy Mir in 1973, her memoir was not published in Russian until 1976.

== Works ==
- Tatiana Sukhotina-Tolstaya (1951). Alec Brown (ed.). The Tolstoy Home: Diaries of Tatiana Sukhotin Tolstoy. London: Harvill Press. ASIN B000KNKSXG.
