= Protestant Cemetery, Rome =

Non-catholic cemetery in Rome, Italy

Non-Catholic Cemetery Protestant Cemetery
- Cimitero acattolico
- Interactive map of Non-Catholic Cemetery; Protestant Cemetery

Details
- Established: 1716
- Location: Rome
- Country: Italy
- Coordinates: 41°52′35″N 12°28′48″E
- Type: Public
- Style: 18th–19th-century European
- Website: Official website

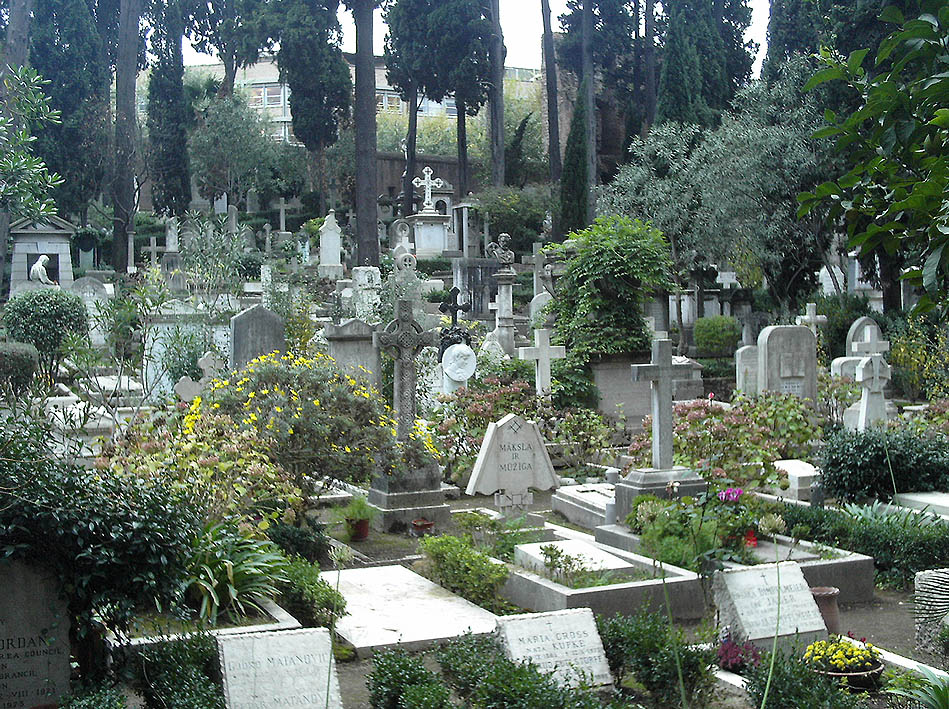

The Non-Catholic Cemetery (Italian: Cimitero Acattolico), also referred to as the Protestant Cemetery (Cimitero dei protestanti) or the English Cemetery (Cimitero degli inglesi), is a private cemetery in the rione of Testaccio in Rome. It is near Porta San Paolo and adjacent to the Pyramid of Cestius, a small-scale Egyptian-style pyramid built between 18 and 12 BCE as a tomb and later incorporated into the section of the Aurelian Walls that borders the cemetery. It has Mediterranean cypress, pomegranate and other trees, and a grassy meadow.

It is the final resting place of certain non-Catholics living in Rome or Italy in general, including but not exclusive to Protestants or British people. The earliest known burial is that of a Dr. Arthur, a Protestant medical doctor hailing from Edinburgh, in 1716. The English poets John Keats and Percy Bysshe Shelley, as well as Russian painter Karl Briullov, are buried there. While mainly the resting place of British and Protestant people or non-Catholic foreigners and non-Italians living in Italy, it also serves as the burial ground for some prominent atheist, agnostic, or non-believer Italians, such as Italian Marxist Antonio Gramsci and Italian president Giorgio Napolitano.

== History ==
Since the norms of the Catholic Church forbade burying on consecrated ground non-Catholics – including Protestants, Jews and Orthodox – as well as suicides (these, after death, were "expelled" by the Christian community and buried outside the walls or at the extreme edge of the same), burials occurred at night to avoid manifestations of religious fanaticism and to preserve the safety of those who participated in the funeral rites. An exception was made for Sir Walter Synnot, who managed to bury his daughter in broad daylight in 1821; he was accompanied by a group of guards to be protected from incursions of fanatics.

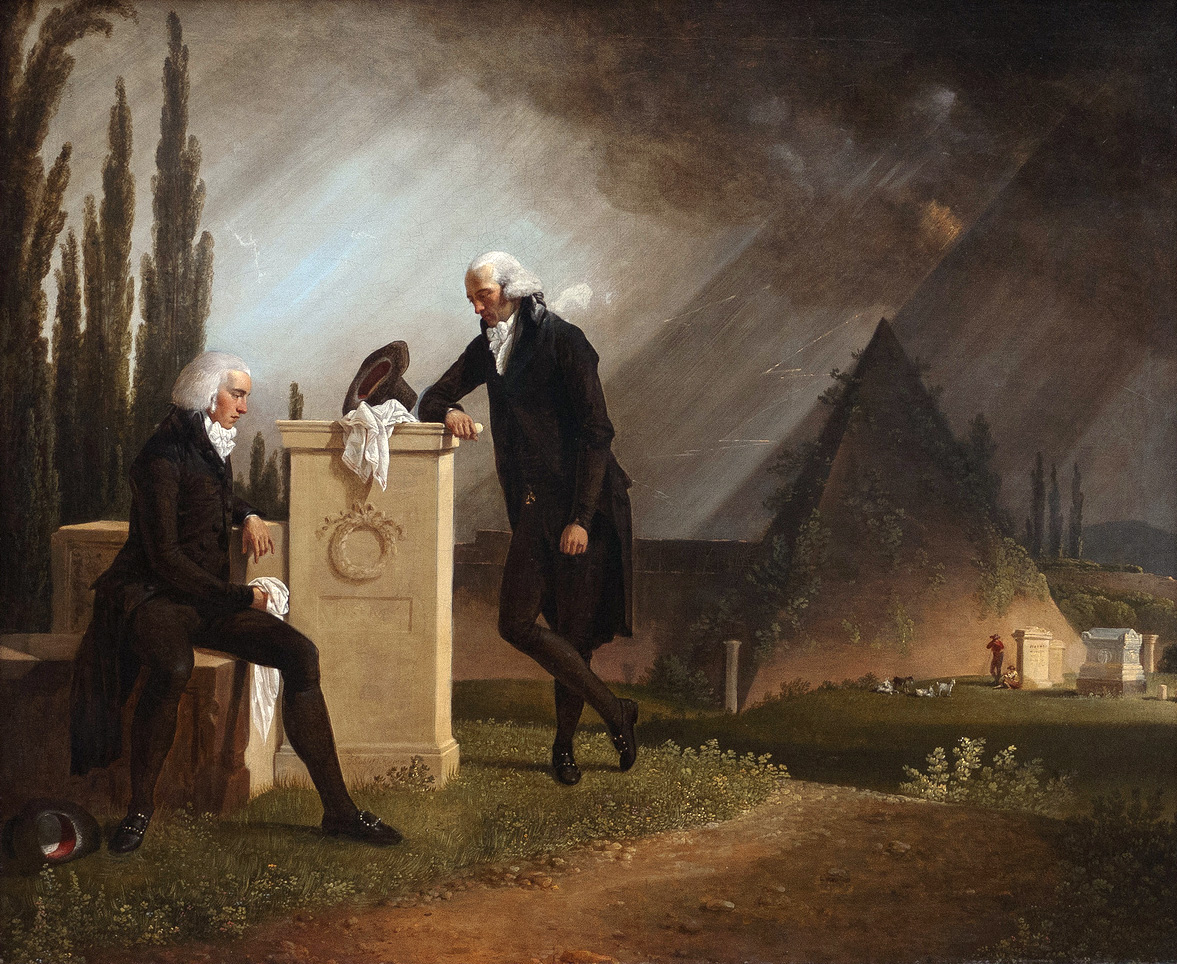
Roman Elegy by Jacques Sablet, 1791

In the 18th and 19th centuries, the area of the non-Catholic cemetery was called "The meadows of the Roman people". It was an area of public property, where drovers used to graze the cattle, wine was kept in the cavities created in the so-called Monte dei Cocci, an artificial hill where the Romans went to have fun. The area was dominated by the Pyramid of Caius Cestius which for centuries was one of the most visited monuments of the city. It was the non-Catholics themselves who chose those places for their burials, and they were allowed by a decision of the Holy Office, which in 1671 consented that the "non-Catholic Messers" who died in the city were spared a burial in the shameful cemetery of Muro Torto. The first burial of a Protestant was that of a follower of the exiled King James VII and II, named William Arthur, who died in Rome where he had come to escape the repressions following the defeats of the Jacobites in Scotland. Other burials followed, which did not concern only courtiers of King James II, whose family in the meanwhile had settled in Rome. It is said that in 1732 the treasurer of the King of England, William Ellis, was buried at the foot of the Pyramid. By that time the area had acquired the status of a cemetery of the British, although the people buried there were not only from the United Kingdom.

Map of the cemetery

The cemetery developed without any official recognition and only at the end of 1700 Papal authorities started to take care of it. It was not until the 1820s that the Papal government appointed a custodian to oversee the area and the cemetery’s functions. The public disinterest was mainly determined by the fact that in the current mentality, where the only burial conceived by the Catholics were the ones happening in a church, the availability of a cemetery that provided non-Catholic burials was not considered a privilege.

At the beginning of the nineteenth century, only holly plants grew in the area, and there was no other natural nor artificial protection for the tombs scattered in the countryside, where cattle were grazing, as the cypresses that adorn the cemetery today were planted later on. In 1824 a moat was erected that surrounded the ancient part of the cemetery. In ancient times crosses or inscriptions were forbidden, as in all non-Catholic cemeteries, at least until 1870.

The cemetery contains six Commonwealth war graves of British service personnel of World War I (two of whom were reburied here from Verano Cemetery in Rome) and one Royal Navy officer of World War II.

For a long time, there have been common graves divided by nations: Germany, Greece, Sweden and Romania.

As of 2011, the custody and management of the cemetery was entrusted to foreign representatives in Italy.

=== Italians ===
The Non-Catholic Cemetery of Rome is intended for the rest of all non-Catholics, without any distinction of nationality. Because of the scarcity of space, relatively few illustrious Italians are buried there, on the grounds of having expressed in life alternative culture and ideas ("foreign" compared to the dominant one), for the quality of their work, or for any other circumstances for which they were somehow deemed "foreign" in their own country. Among them, the politicians Antonio Gramsci and Emilio Lussu alongside Giorgio Napolitano, the writer and poet Dario Bellezza, the writers Carlo Emilio Gadda and Luce d'Eramo and a few others. It is rare that new burials are added. On 18 July 2019, the writer Andrea Camilleri was buried here. In 2023, former President of Italy Giorgio Napolitano was buried here.

== Burials ==
Nicholas Stanley-Price has published an Inventory of early burials at the Non-Catholic Cemetery.

=== John Keats ===
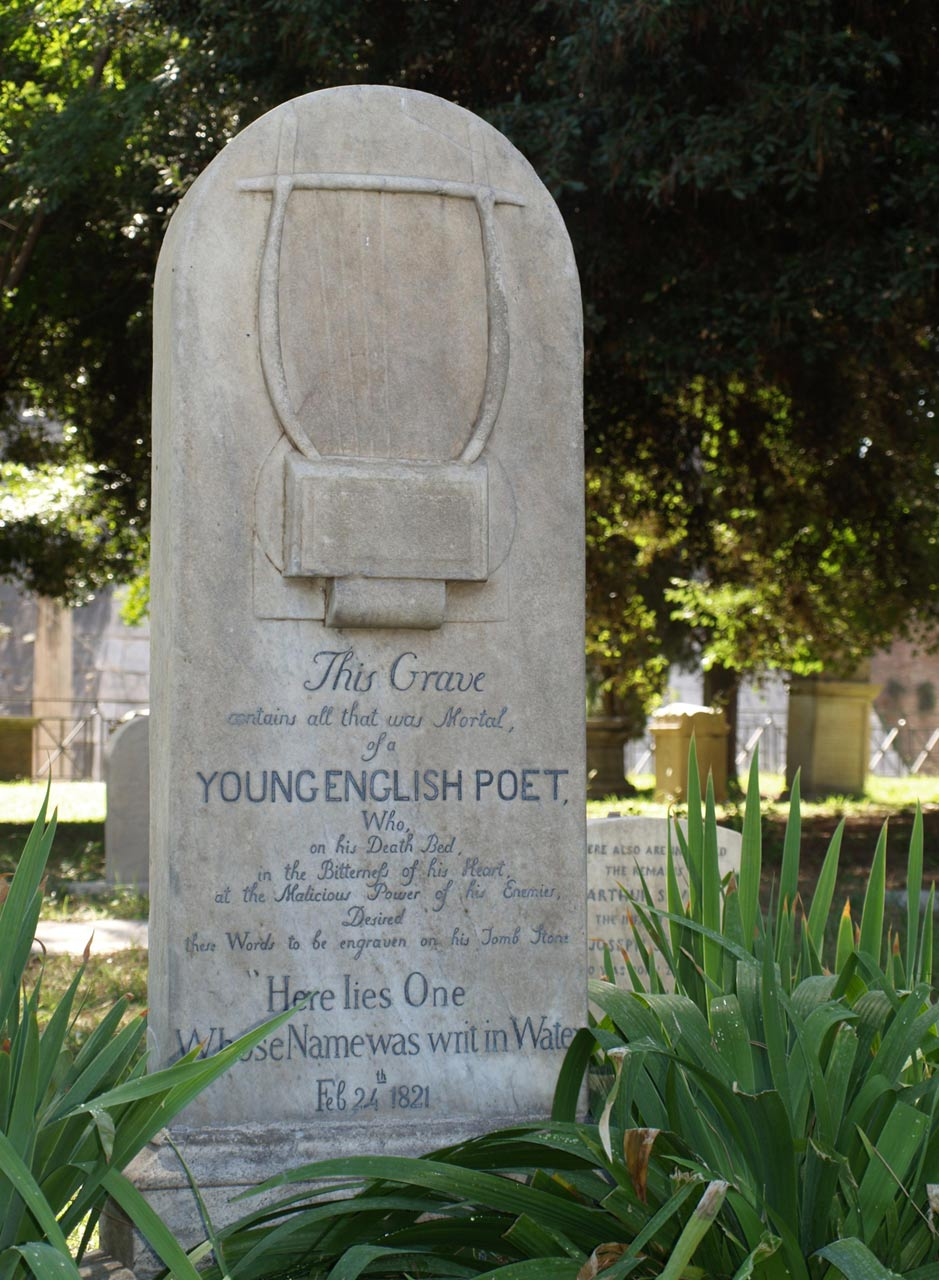
Tombstone of John Keats

Keats died in Rome of tuberculosis at the age of 25, and is buried in the cemetery. His epitaph, which does not mention him by name, is by his friends Joseph Severn and Charles Armitage Brown, and reads:

This grave contains all that was mortal, of a young English poet, who on his death bed, in the bitterness of his heart, at the malicious power of his enemies, desired these words to be engraven on his tombstone: Here lies one whose name was writ in water.

=== Percy Bysshe Shelley ===
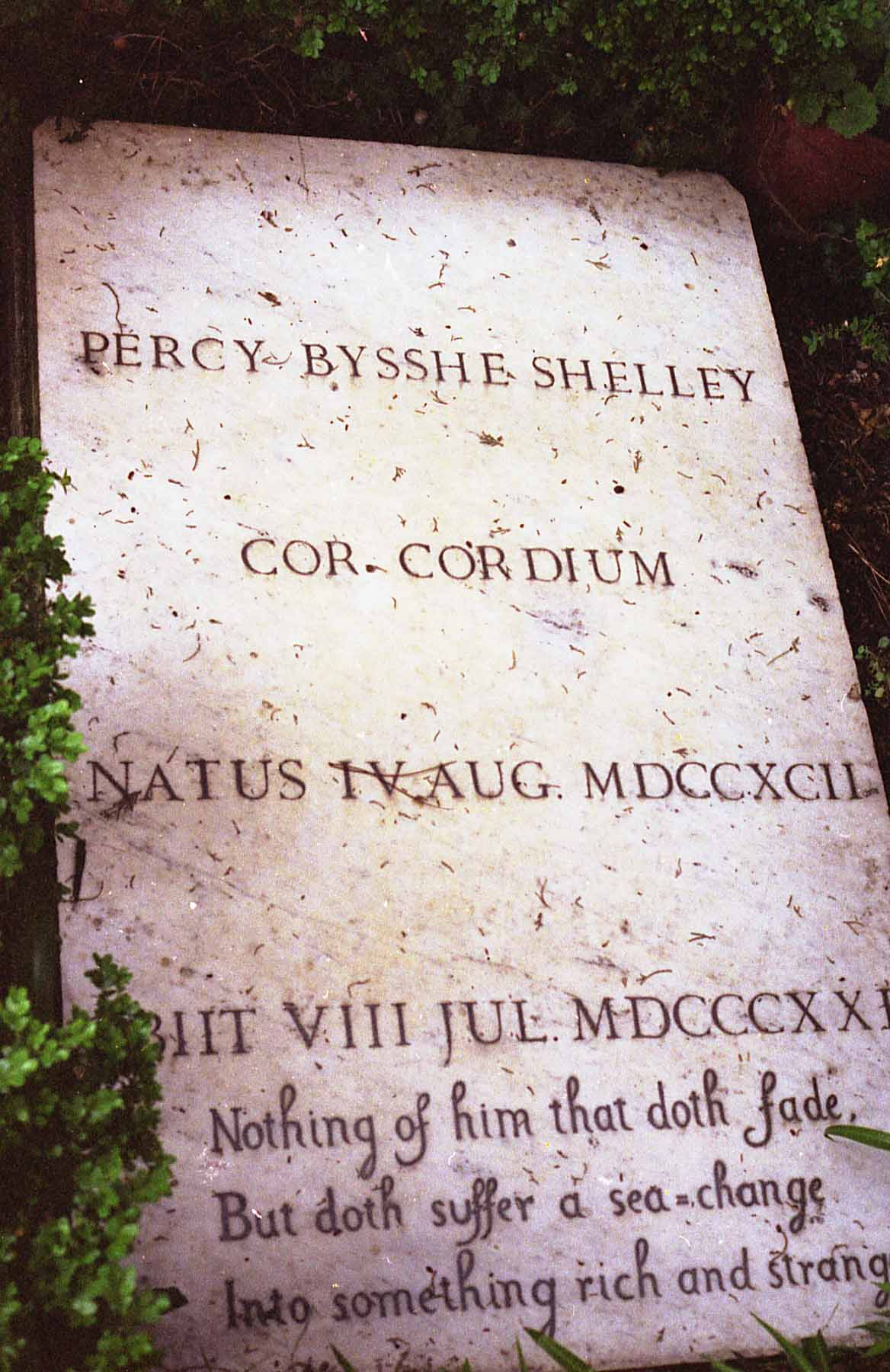
Tombstone of Percy Bysshe Shelley

Shelley drowned in 1822 in a sailing accident off the Italian Riviera. When his body washed up upon the shore, a copy of Keats's poetry borrowed from Leigh Hunt was discovered in his pocket, doubled back, as though it had been put away in a hurry. He was cremated on the beach near Viareggio by his friends, the poet Lord Byron and the English adventurer Edward John Trelawny. His ashes were sent to the British consulate in Rome, who had them interred in the Protestant Cemetery some months later.

Shelley's heart supposedly survived cremation and was snatched out of the flames by Trelawny, who subsequently gave it to Shelley's widow, Mary. When Mary Shelley died, the heart was found in her desk wrapped in the manuscript of "Adonais", the elegy Shelley had written the year before upon the death of Keats, in which the poet urges the traveller, "Go thou to Rome ...".

Shelley and Mary's three-year-old son William was also buried in the Protestant Cemetery.

Shelley's heart was finally buried, encased in silver, in 1889, with the son who survived him, Sir Percy Florence Shelley, but his gravestone in the Protestant Cemetery is inscribed: Cor cordium ("heart of hearts"), followed by a quotation from Shakespeare's The Tempest:

Nothing of him that doth fade,
But doth suffer a sea change,
Into something rich and strange.

=== Other burials ===
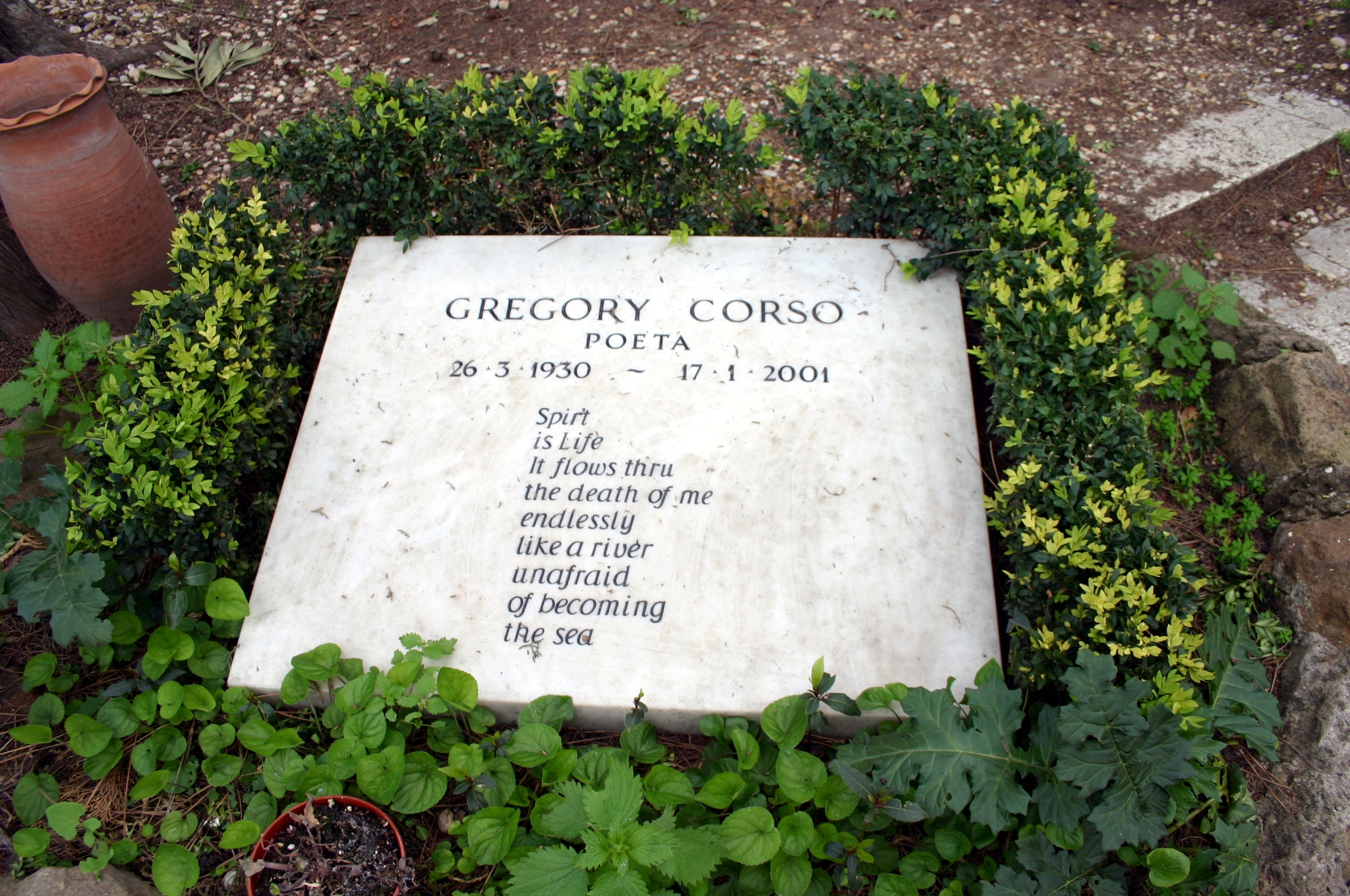
Grave of Gregory Corso

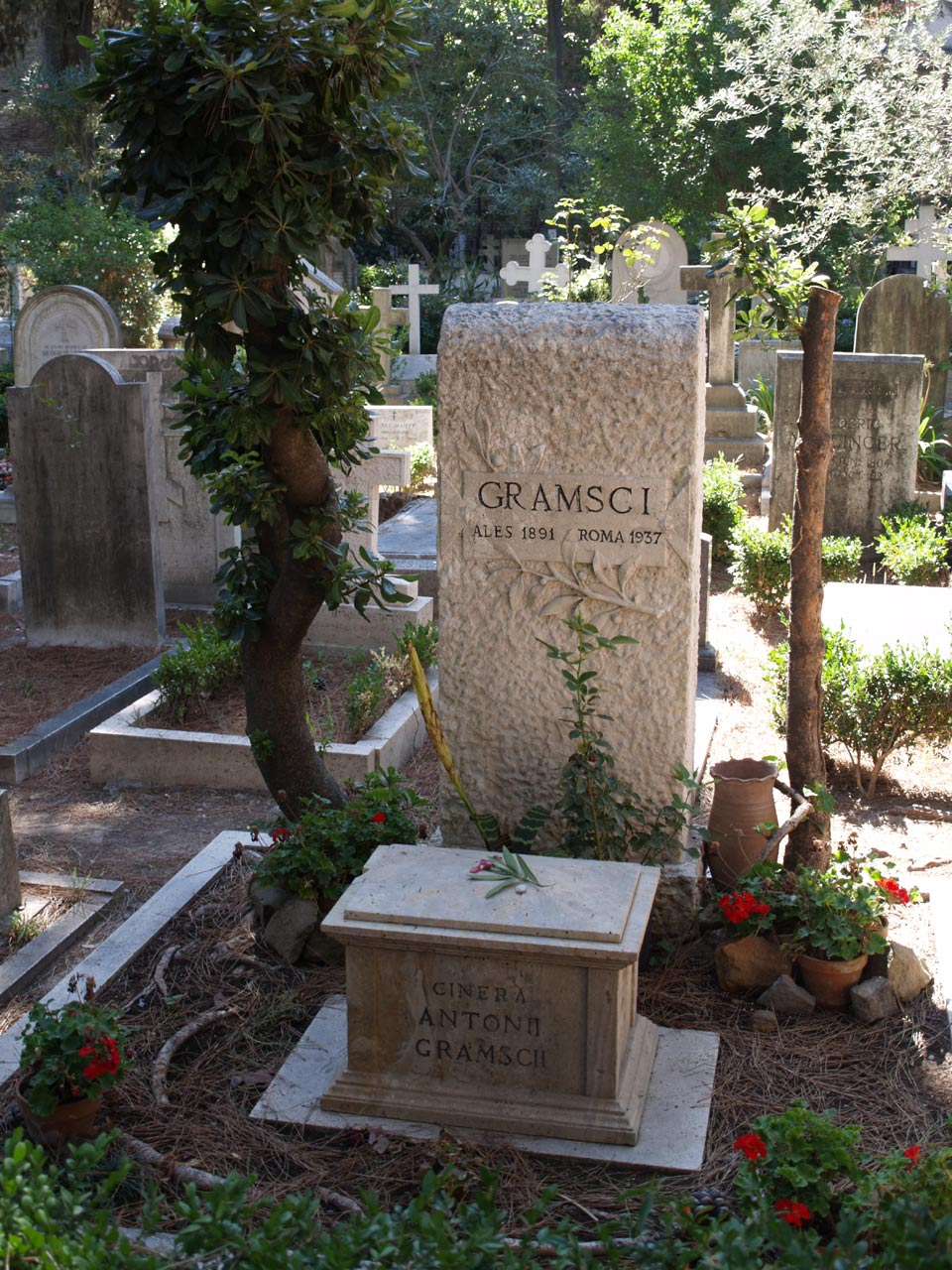
Grave of Antonio Gramsci

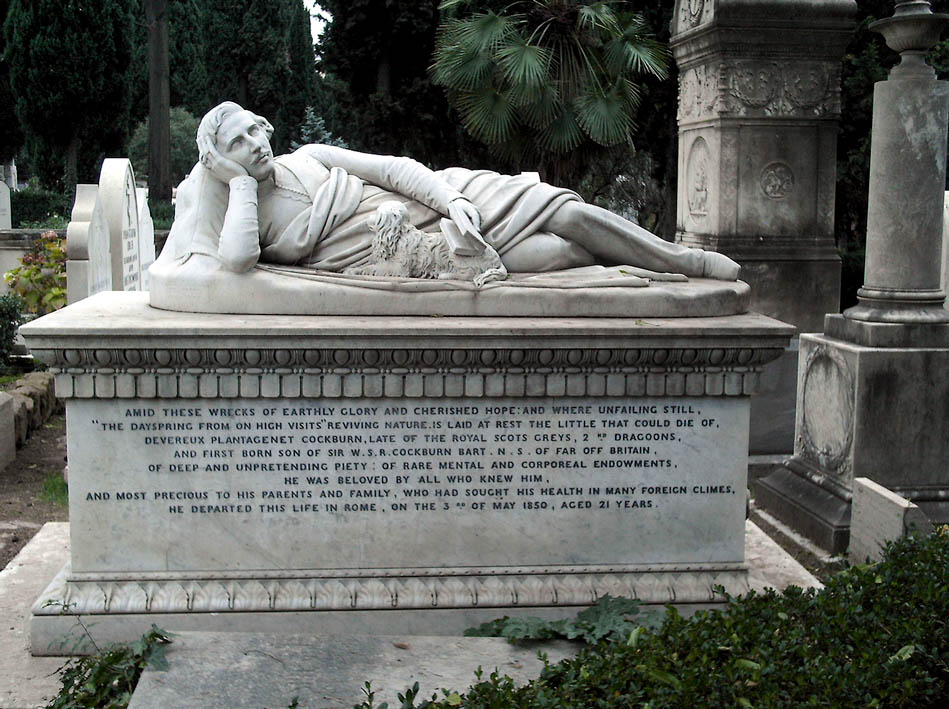
Devereux Plantagenet Cockburn, † 1850, monument by Benjamin Edward Spence

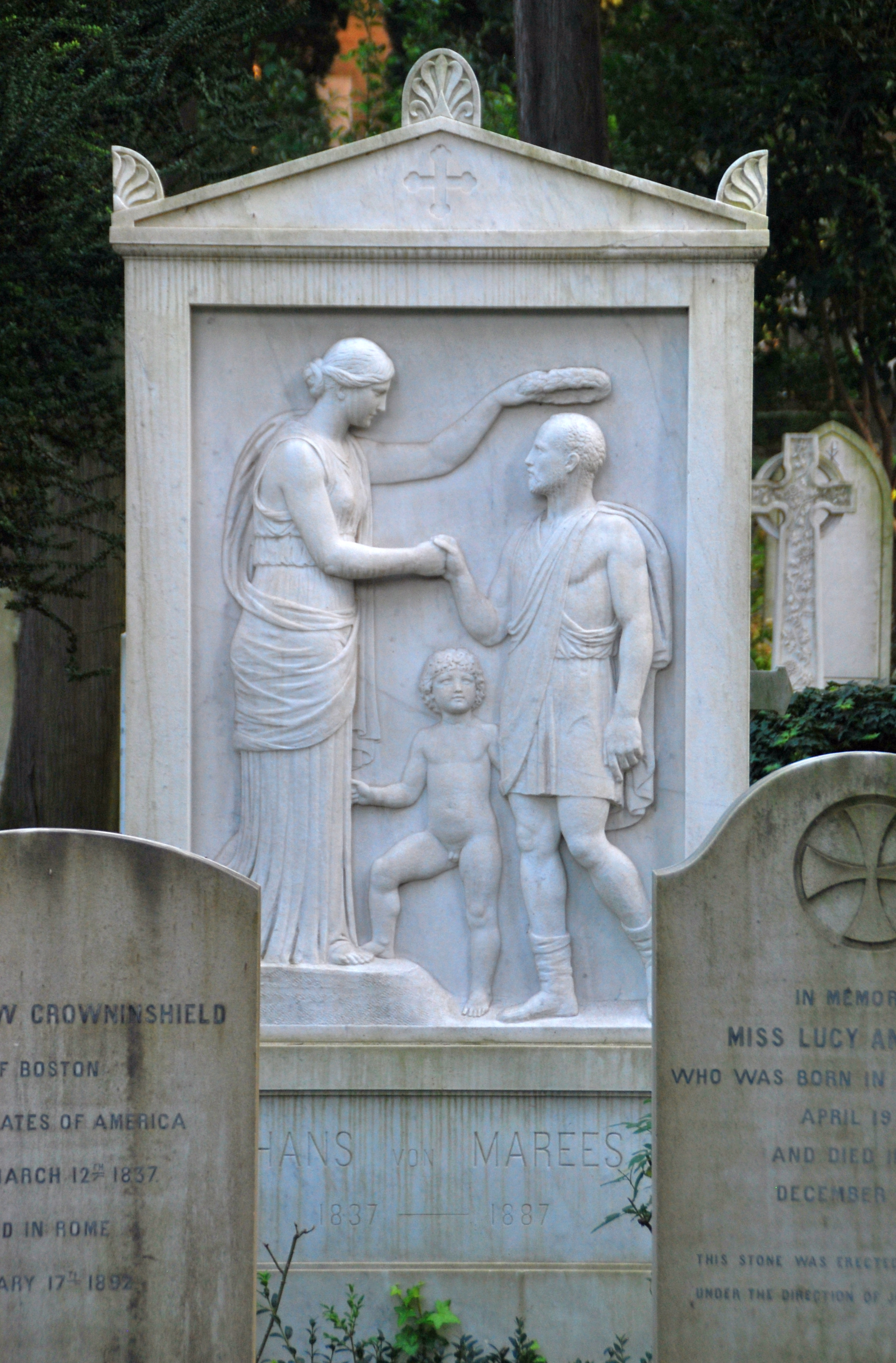
Grave of Hans von Marées

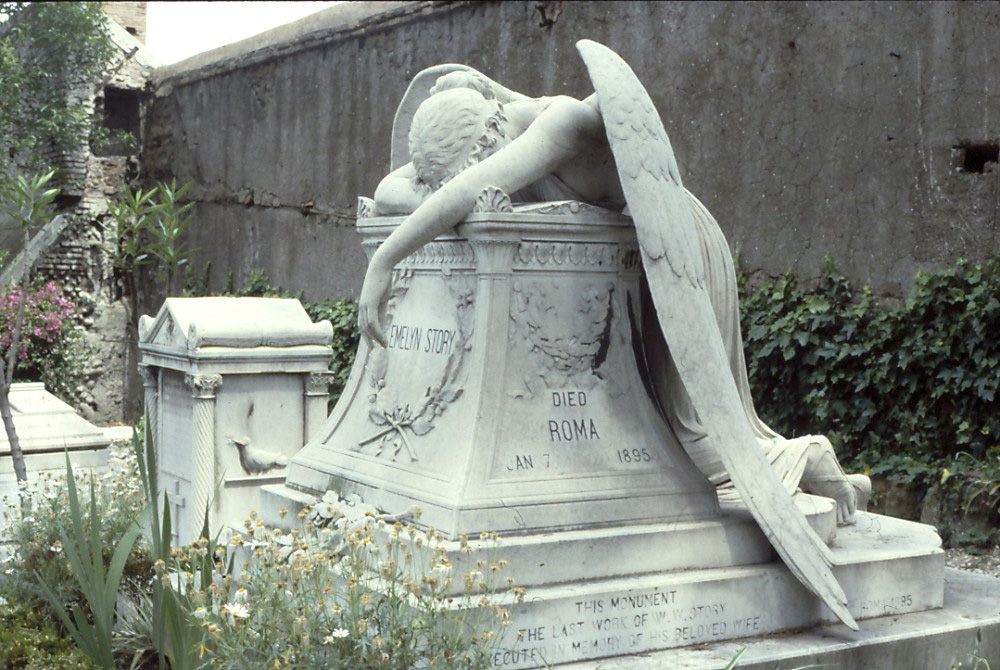
Story's Angel of Grief

- Arthur Aitken (1861–1924), British military commander
- Johan David Åkerblad (1763–1819), Swedish diplomat
- Walther Amelung (1865–1927), German classical archaeologist
- Hendrik Christian Andersen (1872–1940), sculptor, friend of Henry James
- Angelica Balabanoff (1878–1965), Jewish Russian-Italian communist and social democratic activist
- R. M. Ballantyne (1825–1894), Scottish novelist
- Jakob Salomon Bartholdy (1779–1825), Prussian Consul General, art patron
- Rosa Bathurst (1808–1824), drowned in the River Tiber aged 16; moving monument by Richard Westmacott
- John Bell (1763–1820), Scottish surgeon and anatomist
- Dario Bellezza (1944–1996), Italian poet, author and playwright
- Karl Julius Beloch (1854–1929), German classical and economic historian
- Martin Boyd (1893–1972), Australian novelist and autobiographer
- Pietro Boyesen (1819–1882), Danish photographer
- Karl Briullov (1799–1852), Russian painter
- Giorgio Bulgari (1890–1966), Italian businessman, son of Sotirios Bulgari, the founder of Bulgari
- J.B. Bury (1861–1927), Anglo-Irish historian from County Monaghan
- Andrea Camilleri (1925–2019), Italian novelist
- Asmus Jacob Carstens (1754–1798), Danish-German painter
- Jesse Benedict Carter (1872–1917), American Classical scholar
- Enrico Coleman (1846–1911), artist and orchid-lover
- Gregory Corso (1930–2001), American Beat Generation poet
- Richard Henry Dana Jr. (1815–1882), American author of Two Years Before the Mast
- Luce d'Eramo (1925–2001), Italian writer
- Frances Minto Elliot (1820–1898), English writer
- Robert K. Evans (1852–1926), United States Army Brigadier General
- Robert Finch (1783–1830), English antiquary and connoisseur of the arts
- Arnoldo Foà (1916–2014), Italian actor
- Karl Philipp Fohr (1795–1818), German painter
- Maria Pia Fusco (1939–2016), Italian screenwriter and journalist
- Carlo Emilio Gadda (1893–1973), Italian novelist
- Irene Galitzine (1916–2006) fashion designer
- John Gibson (1790–1866), Welsh sculptor, student of Canova
- August von Goethe (1789–1830), son of Johann Wolfgang von Goethe; his monument features a medallion by Bertel Thorvaldsen
- Joseph Gott (1785–1860), British sculptor, son of Benjamin Gott
- Ferdinand Grammel (1878-1951), German cyclist
- Antonio Gramsci (1891–1937), Italian philosopher, leader of the Italian Communist Party
- Richard Saltonstall Greenough (1819–1904), American sculptor
- Stephen Grimes (1927–1988), British Academy Award winning production designer
- Augustus William Hare (1792–1834), English author
- William Stanley Haseltine (1835–1900), American painter and draftsman
- Johannes Carsten Hauch (1790–1872), Danish poet
- William H. Herriman (1829–1918), American art collector
- Baroness Elizabeth Hoyningen-Huene(1891 – 1973) Fashion Designer.
- Ursula Hirschmann (1913–1991), German anti-fascist activist and an advocate of European federalism
- Wilhelm von Humboldt (1794–1803), son of the German diplomat and linguist Wilhelm von Humboldt
- Gustav (Frederico Constantiono) von Humboldt (1806-1807), also son of Wilhelm von Humboldt on his second diplomatic posting in Rome
- Mathilde von Humboldt-Dachroeden (1800-1881), wife of another son of Wilhelm von Humboldt, (Eduard Emil) Theodor von Humboldt-Dachroeden (1797-1871)
- Vyacheslav Ivanov (1866–1949), Russian poet, philosopher, and classical scholar
- Chauncey Ives (1810–1894), American sculptor
- Gualtiero Jacopetti (1919–2011), Italian director of documentary films
- Dobroslav Jevđević (1895–1962), Serbian World War II commander
- John Keats (1795–1821), English poet
- Lindsay Kemp (1938–2018), British dancer, actor, teacher, mime artist, and choreographer
- August Kestner (1777–1853), German diplomat and art collector
- Adolf Klügmann (1837–1880), German classical archaeologist and numismatist
- Richard Krautheimer (1897–1994), German art and architectural historian
- Antonio Labriola (1843–1904), Italian Marxist theoretician
- Belinda Lee (1935–1961), British actress
- The 12th Duke of Leeds (1884-1964), British diplomat and the last Duke of Leeds; better known as Sir D'Arcy Osborne
- Sir James MacDonald, 8th Baronet of Sleat (1741–1766), Scottish baronet and scholar; his tombstone was designed by G.B. Piranesi
- Hans von Marées (1837–1887), German painter
- George Perkins Marsh (1801–1882), American Minister to Italy 1861–1882, author of Man and Nature
- Richard Mason (1919–1997), British author of The World of Suzy Wong
- Malwida von Meysenbug (1816–1903), German author
- Peter Andreas Munch (1810–1863) Norwegian historian
- Hugh Andrew Johnstone Munro (1819–1885), British classical scholar
- Giorgio Napolitano (1925–2023), Italian politician and president of Italy between 2006 and 2015
- Ernest Nash (1898–1974), German-American scholar, archaeological photographer
- E. Herbert Norman (1909–1957), Canadian diplomat and historian
- Dora Ohlfsen-Bagge (1869–1948), Australian sculptor, and her partner, Hélène de Kuegelgen (died 1948)
- Thomas Jefferson Page (1808–1899), commander of United States Navy expeditions exploring the Río de la Plata
- Pier Pander (1864–1919), Dutch sculptor
- Milena Pavlović-Barili (1909–1945), Serbian-Italian artist
- John Piccoli (1939–1955), son of American artists Juanita and Girolamo (Nemo) Piccoli of Anticoli Corrado
- Bruno Pontecorvo (1913–1993), Italian nuclear physicist
- G. Frederick Reinhardt (1911–1971), U.S. Ambassador to Italy, 1961–1968; administrator of this cemetery, 1961–1968
- Heinrich Reinhold (1788–1825), German painter, draughtsman, engraver; his tombstone features a medallion by Bertel Thorvaldsen
- Sarah Parker Remond (1826–1894), African American abolitionist and physician
- August Riedel (1799–1883) German artist
- Amelia Rosselli (1930–1996), Italian poet
- Peter Rockwell (1936–2020), American sculptor and son of Norman Rockwell
- Gottfried Semper (1803–1879), German architect
- Joseph Severn (1793–1879), English painter, consul in Rome, and friend of John Keats, beside whom he is buried
- Percy Bysshe Shelley (1792–1822), English poet
- Franklin Simmons (1839–1913), American sculptor and painter
- William Wetmore Story (1819–1895), American sculptor, buried beside his wife, Emelyn Story, under his own Angel of Grief
- Niklāvs Strunke (1894–1966), Latvian painter
- Pavel Svedomsky (1849–1904), Russian painter
- John Addington Symonds (1840–1893), English poet and critic
- Manfredo Tafuri (1935–1994), Italian architectural historian
- Tatiana Tolstaya (1864–1950), Russian painter and memoirist and daughter of Leo Tolstoy and Sophia Tolstaya
- Edward John Trelawny (1792–1881), English author, friend of Percy Bysshe Shelley, beside whose ashes he is buried
- James Turner (1829-1893), Bishop of Grafton and Armidale
- Elihu Vedder (1836–1923), American painter, sculptor, graphic artist
- Shefqet Vërlaci (1877–1946), Prime Minister of Albania
- Wilhelm Friedrich Waiblinger (1804–1830), German poet and biographer of Friedrich Hölderlin
- J. Rodolfo Wilcock (1919–1978), Argentine writer, poet, critic and translator
- Friedrich Adolf Freiherr von Willisen (1798–1864), Prussian General and Ambassador to the Holy See
- Constance Fenimore Woolson (1840–1894), American novelist and short story writer, friend of Henry James
- Nikolai Von Wrangel (1869 - 1927) Russian Baron and Adjutant to Grand Duke Michael of Russia.
- Richard James Wyatt (1795–1860), English sculptor
- Helen Zelezny-Scholz (1882–1974), Czech-born sculptor and architectural sculptor
- Jutta of Mecklenburg-Strelitz (1880-1946), German princess who was the Crown Princess of Montenegro from 1899 till 1918.

== See also ==
- Old English Cemetery, Livorno
- English Cemetery, Florence
