= Heinrich Reinhold =

German painter

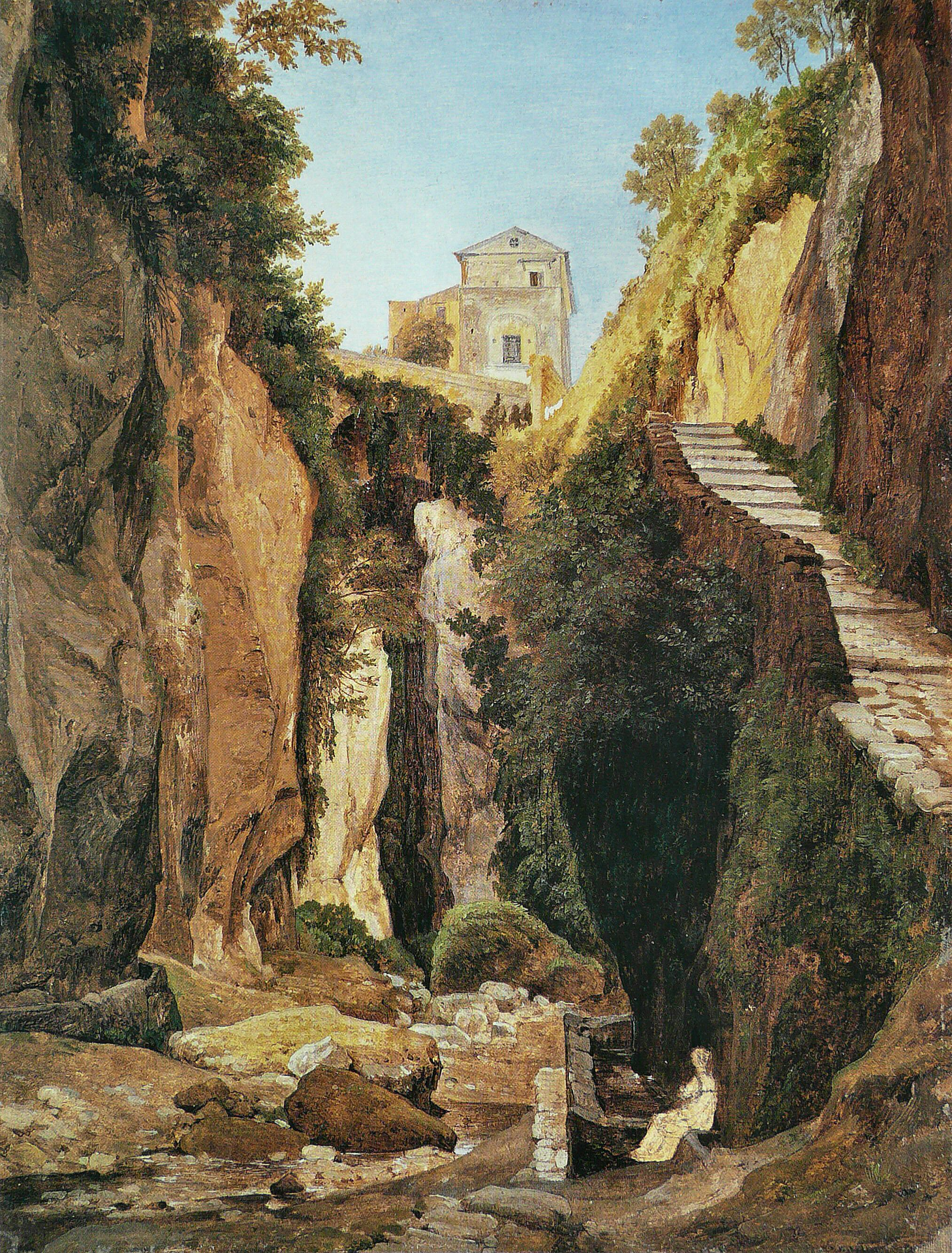
Ravine at Sorrento, 1823, oil on paper reinforced with canvas; Kunsthalle, Hamburg

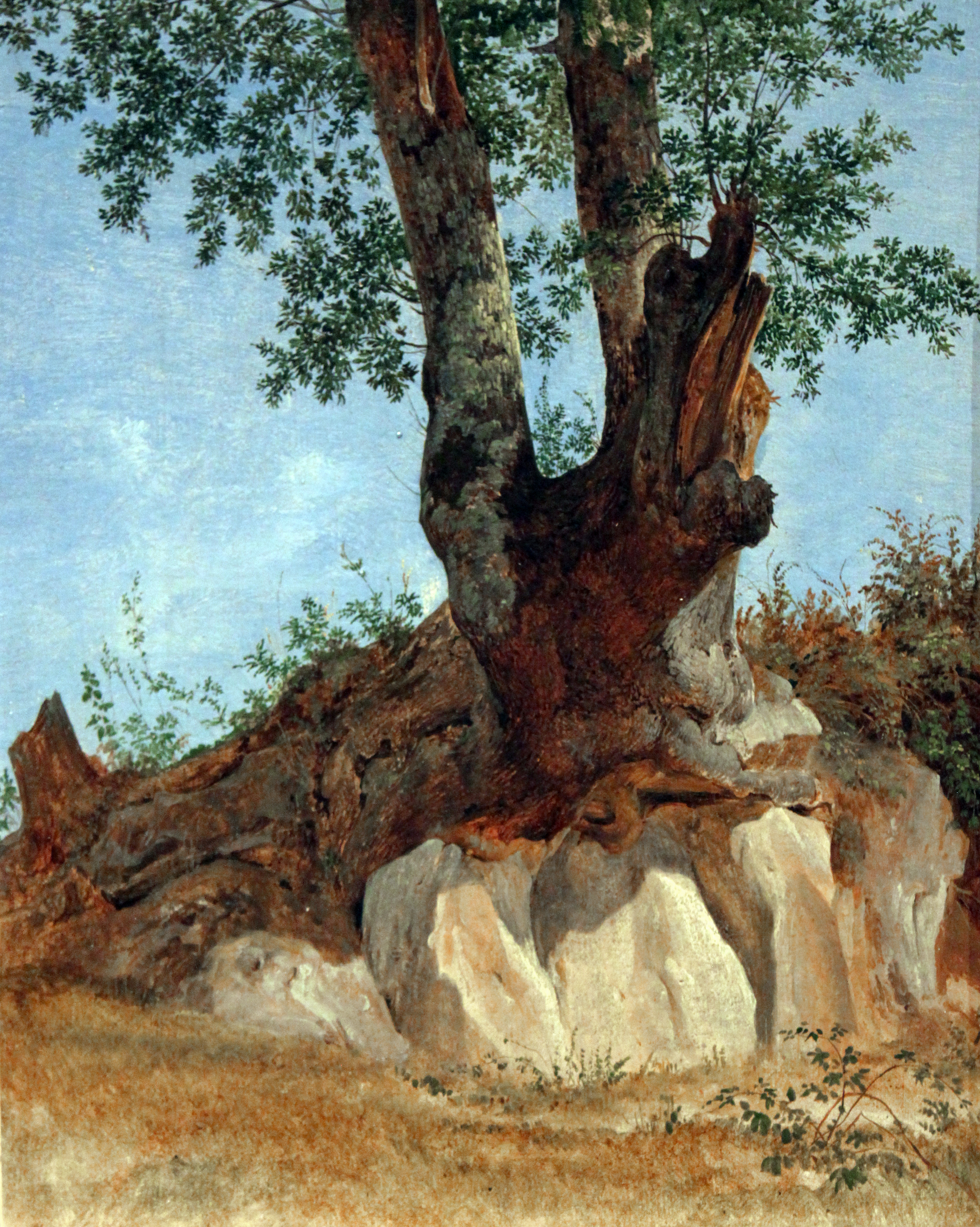
A Tree in the Campagna, 1822, Hamburger Kunsthalle

Johann Heinrich Carl Reinhold (18 July 1788 – 15 January 1825) was a German painter and engraver.

== Life ==
Heinrich Reinhold was born in Gera, Thuringia, the younger half-brother of the landscape painter Friedrich Philipp Reinhold (1779-1840). He studied first in Dresden at the Academy of Fine Arts (Akademie der bildenden Künste). In 1806 he moved to his brother in Vienna, where he attended the Akademie der bildenden Künste Wien. Here he came to the notice of the General Director of Museums in Paris, Dominique Vivant, Baron de Denon, and on his advice moved to Paris in 1809. He remained there for five years, during which he was occupied on a work about the campaigns of Napoleon. He returned to Vienna, and then in 1819 accompanied the painter Johann Christoph Erhard to Italy. After spending time in Rome and Naples he toured Sicily in the company of Prince Lobkowitz. Once back in Rome, he tried to dissuade his friend Erhard from committing suicide, but not only failed to do so but also in the attempt fell terminally ill himself, and died at the age of 36. He was buried in the Protestant Cemetery, Rome, where his monument features sculpture by Bertel Thorvaldsen.

== Works ==
Apart from his illustration work, Reinhold was principally a landscape artist. After becoming familiar with the ideas of Romanticism in Vienna, he belonged to the circle of German painters in Rome who were principally influenced by Joseph Anton Koch.

His works include:

- Der Watzmann vom Wimbachtal aus (Vienna, Österreichische Galerie), 1818, oil on panel
- Küste bei Pozzuoli (Wuppertal, Von der Heydt Museum, Inv. Nr. G 0601), after 1819, oil on canvas, 43 x 59,5 cm
- Landschaft bei Olevano, pencil on tracing paper, 31,6 x 41,3 cm
- Blick von Olevano auf die Campagna (Munich, Neue Pinakothek), 1822, oil on paper, 12,6 x 21,6 cm
- Terrasse des Kapuzinerklosters in Sorrent (Munich, Neue Pinakothek, Inv. Nr. WAF 819), c. 1823/24, oil on canvas, 41,7 x 54,8 cm
- Landschaft bei Berchtesgaden, auf dem Weg zum Königssee, (I. Tremmel Collection), pencil on vellum, 29,5 x 42,4 cm

== Sources ==
- Franz Vallentin (1907). "Reinhold, Heinrich". Allgemeine Deutsche Biographie (in German). Vol. 53. Leipzig: Duncker & Humblot. pp. 286–287.
