= Jesse Benedict Carter =

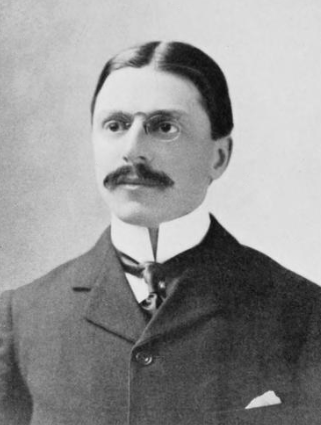
- Born: June 16, 1872; New York City, US
- Died: July 20, 1917 (aged 45); Cervignano del Friuli, Italy
- Burial place: Protestant Cemetery, Rome
- Occupation: Classical scholar
- Spouse: Kate Freeman Carter (m. 1902)

Jesse Benedict Carter (June 16, 1872 – July 20, 1917) was a prominent American classicist of the nineteenth and early twentieth centuries. Carter's life and career were cut short when he died of heatstroke while on an Italian aid mission during World War I.

== Biography ==
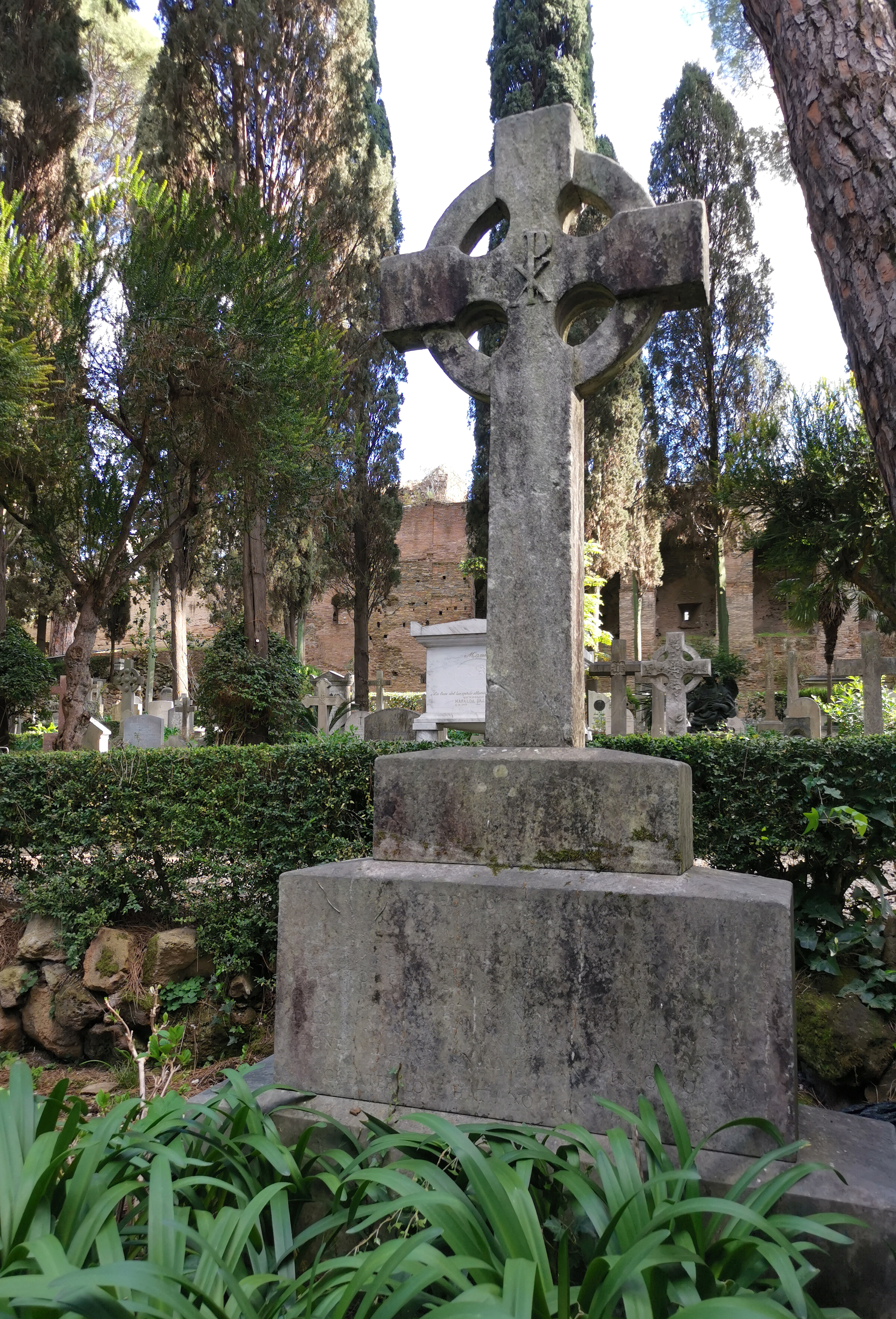
Carter's grave at the Protestant Cemetery, Rome

Carter was born in New York City on June 16, 1872, the son of Peter and Marie Louise Carter. He was educated at New York University (1889-1890), at Princeton University (A.B. 1893), and at Martin Luther University of Halle-Wittenberg (Ph.D. 1898). At Halle he studied with Georg Wissowa and Carl Robert. He was Professor of Latin at Princeton from 1902. In 1904 he moved to Rome to join the faculty of the American School of Classical Studies, becoming director in 1907. When the American School of Classical Studies merged with the American Academy in Rome in 1911, Carter continued on as a faculty member and became the AAR director in 1912, following the death of Francis Davis Millet aboard the Titanic.

Carter's scholarship focused on Roman religion and topography. He collaborated with Christian Hülsen on topographical studies of the Forum Romanum and produced his own work on the scholarship of Roman religion.

Carter was married to Kate Freeman Carter (March 5, 1870, in Peekskill, New York, - September 8, 1948, at Clinique Val-Mont, Glion, Montreux, Switzerland) who was the daughter of the Reverend John and Mary Freeman.

Carter died of heatstroke in Cervignano del Friuli, Italy while on an aid mission during World War I.

He was awarded the Order of the Crown of Italy by King Victor Emmanuel III. He is buried in the Protestant Cemetery of Rome, Italy.
