= Ernest Nash =

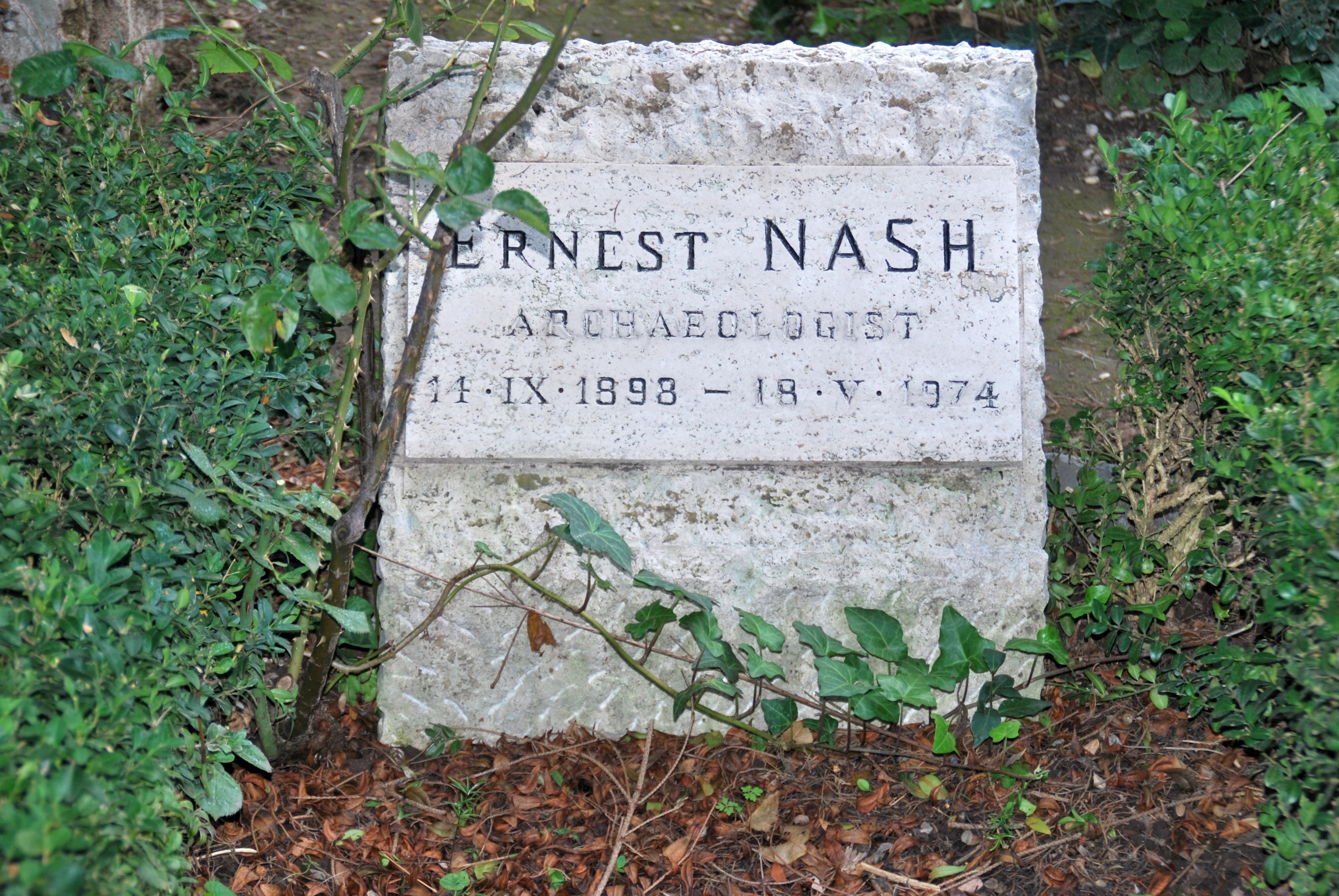
Grave of Ernest Nash at the Cimitero acattolico in Rome.

Ernest Nash (September 14, 1898, in Potsdam, Germany – May 18, 1974 in Rome, Italy) was a student of Roman architecture and pioneer of archaeological photography. Nash was born as Ernst Nathan in Potsdam, Germany, but later changed his name to Nash when he was living in the United States between 1939 and 1952.

He was a graduate of the University of Jena and had a law office in his native city of Potsdam, Germany.

Nash first went to Italy on August 30, 1936, with the goal of documenting in photographs the ancient ruins of Rome, Ostia, and Pompeii. The main reason for fleeing Potsdam was the institution of the racial laws by Adolf Hitler. He emigrated to the United States in 1939 but returned to Italy in 1952 to continue his work. He established the Fototeca Unione archive at the American Academy in Rome in 1957 and served as its director.

Besides architectural photography he also produced a series of portraits of famous musicians, including Béla Bartók, while he lived in New York City. The Bartók photo is still used by The New York Times.

Nash died in Rome in 1974.

== Works ==
- Roman towns. Photographs and text by Ernest Nash. (New York: J. J. Augustin, 1944).
- Pictorial Dictionary of Ancient Rome 2 vol. (1962).

== Literature ==
- Radnoti-Alföldi, M.; Lahusen, M. C.: Ernest Nash - Ernst Nathan: Potsdam, Rom, New York, Rom, Nicolai'sche Verlagsbuchhandlung; 2000. In German. ISBN 3-87584-045-3.
- A Short Biography of Ernest Nash
- The Urban Legacy of Ancient Rome: Photographs from the Ernest Nash Fototeca Unione Collection at Stanford University Library
