= Irene Galitzine =

Russian-Georgian fashion designer

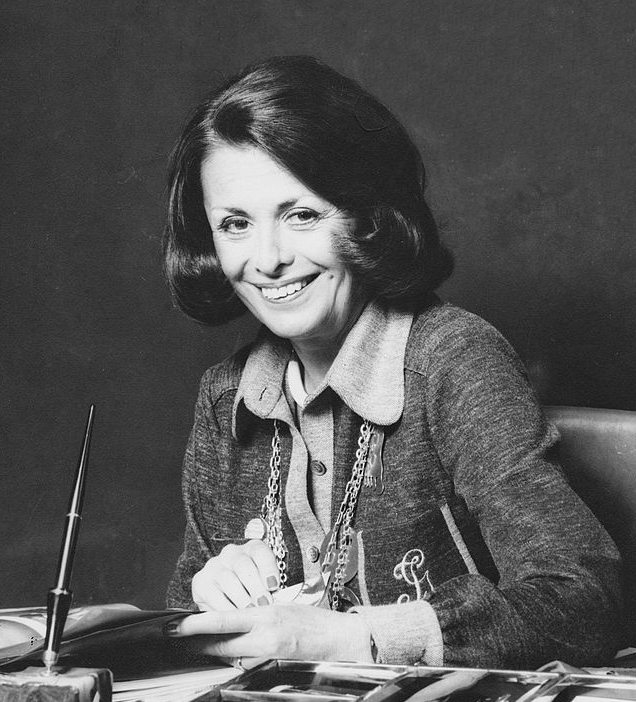
- Galitzine in 1970
- Born: 22 July 1916; Tbilisi, Russian Empire (now Georgia)
- Died: 20 October 2006 (aged 90); Rome, Italy
- Known for: Illustration, fashion design

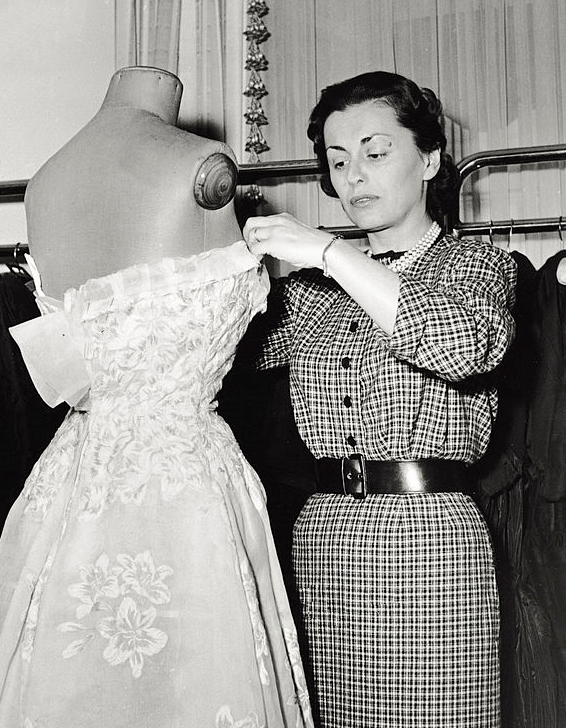
Irene Galitzine in the 1950s

Princess Irene Galitzine (Georgian: ირინა გალიცინი; Russian: Ирен Голицына; 22 July 1916 – 20 October 2006) was a Russian-Georgian fashion designer whose best known creation was the palazzo pyjama.

== Early life ==
Princess Irene Galitzine was born in 1916 in Tiflis, Russian Empire (now Tbilisi, Georgia), to Prince Boris Galitzine (1878–1958), an official of the imperial guard who belonged to the aristocratic Galitzine family, whose origins date back to 1200, and a Georgian mother, Princess Nina Lazareff (Lazarashvili; 1888–1957). However, her family were forced to flee the country following the 1917 October Revolution, and took up residence in Italy.

== Career ==
After studying art in Rome, English at Cambridge and French at the Sorbonne, Galitzine joined the Italian designers Sorelle Fontana in 1943 and worked with them for 3 years.

In 1946, she opened her own salon and presented her first collection. In 1960, she achieved great success with the launch of her palazzo pyjamas which were wide legged evening trousers made of soft silk. Evening pyjamas became a firm fixture of the fashion scene during the 1960s. Currently, some of her original palazzo pyjama collection still exist in notable museums around the world including the Metropolitan Museum of Art in New York, the Victoria and Albert Museum in London and the Costume Museum in St. Petersburg, Russia.

In 1962, she was named Designer of the Year by the Italian fashion press. In 1965, she won the British Sunday Times International Fashion Award and was named to the International Best Dressed List Hall of Fame. Since then, her creations have been worn by some of the most famous women in the world such as Sofia Loren, Elizabeth Taylor, Lee Radziwill, Jacqueline Kennedy Onassis, Princess Ira von Fürstenberg, Queen Paola of Belgium, Queen Anne-Marie of Greece, Marie-Hélène de Rothschild, Duchess of Windsor, Soraya Esfandiary-Bakhtiari, Merle Oberon, Audrey Hepburn, Hope Portocarrero, Marella Agnelli, Greta Garbo, Catherine Spaak, Pamela Churchill Harriman and Claudia Cardinale.

She appears as herself in the 1975 film, Mahogany_(film).

In 1990, the Galitzine label was purchased by the Xines Company. She was subsequently sentenced to six months in jail for tax evasion.

In September 1996, Galitizine opened her first boutique in Moscow, and in November of the same year she published her biography entitled From Russia to Russia.

== Personal life ==
Irene Galitzine was married in 1949 to Silvio Medici de Menezes, an aristocrat from Portugal. On 20 October 2006, she died at her home in Rome, aged 90.

She is buried in the Protestant Cemetery, Rome.

== Books ==
- Княжна Голицына – принцесса моды / Редакторы-составители Е.А. Скаммакка дель Мурго, М. Г. Талалай. — М.: ООО «Старая Басманная», 2019. – 212 с., XXXII с. ил. — ISBN 978-5-907169-00-5
