= SS Princess Irene =

A number of steamships were named Princess Irene, including -

- SS Princess Irene (1900), North German Lloyd liner
- SS Princess Irene (1914), Canadian Pacific Steamships liner which served as HMS Princess Irene during WWI
